= List of justices of the Supreme Court of Hawaii =

Following is a list of justices of the Supreme Court of Hawaii.

== Past justices ==
From October 8, 1840, to January 15, 1848, the court was known as the Supreme Court of the Kingdom of Hawaii.

- This early Supreme Court was headed by the King, the Kuhina Nui, and four other chiefs elected by the representative body to serve as Judges. The four judges of the Supreme Court were not associate justices but served that capacity as assistants to the chief justice, i.e. the King.

From January 15, 1848, to December 6, 1852, it was known as the Superior Court of the Kingdom of Hawaii.
From December 6, 1852, to January 17, 1893, it was known as the Supreme Court of the Kingdom of Hawaii.
From January 17, 1893, to July 4, 1898, it was known as the Supreme Court of the Republic of Hawaii.
From July 4, 1898, to August 21, 1959, it was known as the Supreme Court of the Territory of Hawaii.
From August 21, 1959, to the present, it is known as the Supreme Court of Hawaii.

=== Pre-statehood courts ===
Name	Portrait	Appointment	Term End	Chief Justice Appointment	Chief Justice Term End
Kamehameha III		October 8, 1840	January 15, 1848	October 8, 1840	January 15, 1848
Kekāuluohi		October 8, 1840	June 7, 1845		
Keoni Ana		June 10, 1845	January 15, 1848		
Zorobabela Kaʻauwai		May 10, 1842	November, 1846 (resigned)		
Pākī		May 10, 1842	by January 15, 1848		
Charles Kanaʻina		May 10, 1842	by January 15, 1848		
Jonah Kapena		May 10, 1842	by January 15, 1848		
Joshua Kaeo		November, 1846	by January 15, 1848		
Lorrin Andrews		January 15, 1848	January 10, 1855		
John Papa ʻĪʻī		January 15, 1848	February 16, 1864		
William Little Lee		January 16, 1848	May 28, 1857	January 16, 1848	May 28, 1857
George Morison Robertson*		January 10, 1855	December 24, 1863		
Elisha Hunt Allen		June 4, 1857	February 22, 1877	June 4, 1857	February 1, 1877
George Morison Robertson*		February 16, 1864	March 12, 1867		
Robert Grimes Davis		February 16, 1864	July 8, 1868		
James W. Austin		July 10, 1868	July 10, 1869		
Alfred S. Hartwell*		September 30, 1868	February 18, 1874		
Hermann A. Widemann		July 10, 1869	February 18, 1874		
Charles Coffin Harris		February 18, 1874	July 2, 1881	February 1, 1877	July 2, 1881
Albert Francis Judd		February 18, 1874	May 20, 1900	November 5, 1881	May 20, 1900
Lawrence McCully		February 1, 1877	April 10, 1892		
Benjamin H. Austin		November 7, 1881	July 5, 1885		
Edward Preston		July 7, 1885	January 17, 1890		
Richard F. Bickerton		December 29, 1886	December 10, 1895		
Abraham Fornander		December 27, 1886	November 1, 1887		
Sanford B. Dole		December 28, 1887	January 17, 1893		
Walter F. Frear		March 7, 1893	August 15, 1907	July 5, 1900	August 15, 1907
William Austin Whiting		January 11, 1896	July 14, 1900		
Antonio Perry*		July 5, 1900	June 15, 1904		
Clinton A. Galbraith		June 30, 1900	June 15, 1904		
Alfred S. Hartwell*		June 15, 1904	March 9, 1911	August 15, 1907	March 9, 1911
Francis March Hatch		June 15, 1904	January 31, 1905		
Arthur A. Wilder		February 13, 1905	January 25, 1910		
Sidney M. Ballou		August 15, 1907	May 6, 1909		
Antonio Perry*		May 6, 1909	April 2, 1914		
John T. DeBolt		1910	1914		
Alexander George Morison Robertson		March 9, 1911	January 1, 1918	March 9, 1911	January 1, 1918
Edward Minor Watson Jr.		March 19, 1914	December 15, 1916		
Ralph P. Quarles		April 2, 1914	September 12, 1918		
James Leslie Coke*		January 13, 1917	April 17, 1922	March 7, 1918	April 17, 1922
Samuel B. Kemp*		March 7, 1918	April 17, 1922		
William S. Edings		September 26, 1918	October 10, 1922		
Antonio Perry*		April 17, 1922	July 3, 1934	February 26, 1926	July 3, 1934
Emil C. Peters*		April 17, 1922	December 21, 1925	April 17, 1922	December 21, 1925
Alexander Lindsay Jr.		October 10, 1922	September 5, 1926		
James J. Banks		1926	1938		
Charles Francis Parsons		1926	1935		
James Leslie Coke*		July 3, 1934	March 22, 1941	July 3, 1934	March 22, 1941
Emil C. Peters*		1935	1949		
Samuel B. Kemp*		1938	June 30, 1950	June 20, 1941	June 30, 1950
Louis LeBaron		1942	1955		
Albert Moses Cristy		1949	1950		
Edward Armstrong Towse		April 18, 1950	April 6, 1956	October 15, 1951	April 6, 1956
Ingram Stainback		October 15, 1951	1959		
Philip L. Rice		February 7, 1955	July 27, 1959	March 29, 1956	July 27, 1959
Masaji Marumoto		1956	1959		

=== Succession of seats (1900–1959) ===
Chief Justice
Seat established on March 3, 1900 by 60 Stat. 322
Frear	1900–1907
Hartwell	1907–1911
Robertson	1911–1918
Coke	1918–1922
Peters	1922–1925
Perry	1926–1934
Coke	1934–1941
Kemp	1941–1950
Towse	1951–1956
Rice	1956–1959

Associate Justice 1
Seat established on March 3, 1900 by 60 Stat. 322
Galbraith	1900–1904
Hartwell	1904–1907
Ballou	1907–1909
Perry	1909–1914
Quarles	1914–1918
Edings	1918–1922
Lindsay	1922–1926
Parsons	1926–1935
Peters	1935–1949
Cristy	1949–1950
Towse	1950–1956
Stainback	1951–1959

Associate Justice 2
Seat established on March 3, 1900 by 60 Stat. 322
Perry	1900–1904
Hatch	1904–1905
Wilder	1905–1910
DeBolt	1910–1914
Watson	1914–1916
Coke	1917–1918
Kemp	1918–1922
Perry	1922–1926
Banks	1926–1938
Kemp	1938–1941
LeBaron	1942–1955
Rice	1955–1956
Marumoto	1956–1959

=== Courts since statehood ===
Name	Portrait	Appointment	Term End	Chief Justice Appointment	Chief Justice Term End
Charles E. Cassidy		October 5, 1959	May 8, 1967		
Cable A. Wirtz		October 5, 1959	May 8, 1967		
Rhoda Valentine Lewis		October 5, 1959	May 8, 1967		
Masaji Marumoto*		October 5, 1959	September 15, 1960		
Wilfred Tsukiyama		October 5, 1959	December 31, 1965	October 5, 1959	December 31, 1965
Jack Mizuha		April 28, 1961	June 28, 1968		
William S. Richardson		March 25, 1966	October 30, 1982	March 25, 1966	October 30, 1982
Kazuhisa Abe		May 8, 1967	December 28, 1973		
Bernard H. Levinson		May 8, 1967	August 31, 1974		
Masaji Marumoto*		May 8, 1967	December 28, 1973		
Bert T. Kobayashi		July 17, 1969	December 29, 1978		
Thomas Shoichi Ogata		February 5, 1974	December 30, 1981		
Benjamin Menor		April 16, 1974	December 30, 1981		
Homer Baird Kidwell		July 1, 1975	February 28, 1979		
Herman T. F. Lum		January 28, 1980	March 31, 1993	April 26, 1983	March 31, 1993
Edward Nakamura		March 24, 1980	December 28, 1989		
Yoshimi Hayashi		March 30, 1982	March 31, 1992		
Frank D. Padgett		March 30, 1982	March 31, 1992		
James H. Wakatsuki		September 7, 1983	September 22, 1992		
Robert G. Klein		March 31, 1992	February 4, 2000		
Steven Levinson		April 7, 1992	December 30, 2008		
Paula A. Nakayama		April 22, 1993	April 21, 2023		
Mario R. Ramil		May 13, 1993	December 31, 2002		
Ronald Moon		March 9, 1990	August 31, 2010	March 31, 1993	August 31, 2010
James E. Duffy		June 27, 2003	July 1, 2012		
Simeon R. Acoba Jr.		May 19, 2000	February 29, 2014		
Richard W. Pollack		August 6, 2012	June 2, 2020		
Mark E. Recktenwald		May 5, 2009	September 14, 2010	September 14, 2010	September 30, 2025
Sabrina McKenna		March 3, 2011			
Michael D. Wilson		April 17, 2014	March 31, 2023		
Todd W. Eddins		December 11, 2020			
Lisa M. Ginoza		January 12, 2024			
Vladimir Devens		January 12, 2024		May 5, 2026	

- Indicates served non-consecutive terms as either an Associate Justice or Chief Justice.
