= Cable A. Wirtz =

American judge (1910–1980)

Cable A. Wirtz (May 9, 1910 – December, 1980) was a justice of the Supreme Court of Hawaii from October 5, 1959 to May 8, 1967.

== Early life, education, and career ==
Born in Honolulu to Ambrose J. and Mary Emma Meyer Wirtz, he "was named Cable because his father... had been involved in the laying of the trans-Pacific cable". Wirtz graduated from St. Louis College, and then received an A.B. from Santa Clara University in 1932, followed by an LL.B. from Harvard Law School in 1935.

He then entered the private practice of law with the firm of Smith, Wild, Beebe, and Cades from 1935 to 1939, when he became Deputy City-County Attorney in Honolulu until 1942, when he was promoted to City-County Attorney until 1944.

== Judicial service and later life ==
In 1944, Wirtz was appointed by President Franklin D. Roosevelt to a seat as a judge on the 2nd Circuit of Hawaii, to which he was sworn in by Chief Justice Samuel B. Kemp on February 15, 1944. Wirtz was the youngest circuit judge to take the bench in Hawaii when he was appointed in 1944, and served in that capacity until 1951, when he returned to private practice. He was also elected to the Hawaii State Constitutional Convention as a Delegate in 1950, and served on the territorial Commission on Children and Youth, and the Territorial Loyalty Board.

Following Hawaii's admission to statehood in 1959, Wirtz was one of the first justices appointed to the newly established state supreme court, along with Charles E. Cassidy and Rhoda Valentine Lewis. He retired from the court in 1967, and returned to private practice, until 1978, when poor health forced him to curtail his activities.

== Personal life and death ==
On June 17, 1937, Wirtz married Margaret Virginia Hughes, with whom he had a son and a daughter.

Wirtz died in Wailuku, Hawaii, at the age of 70, following a lengthy illness.

Political offices
Preceded by Newly constituted court	Justice of the Supreme Court of Hawaii; 1959–1967	Succeeded by Masaji Marumoto
