= Edward Armstrong Towse =

American judge (1905–1973)

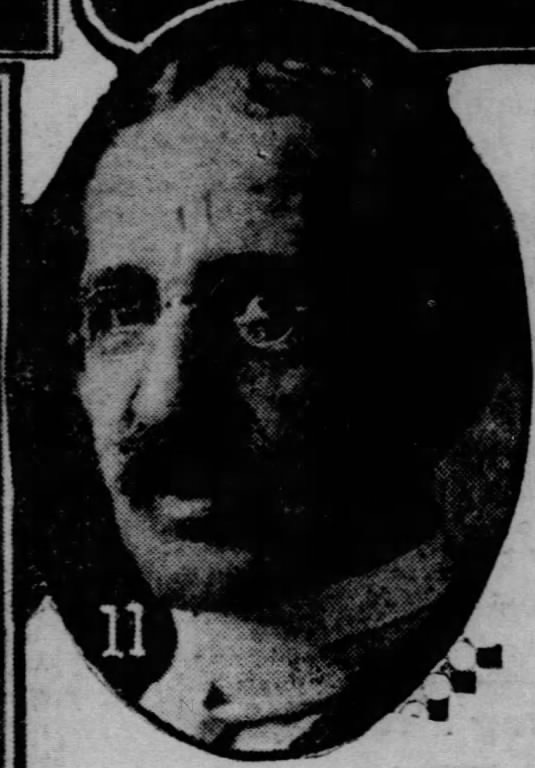

Edward Armstrong Towse (1905 – May 18, 1973) was a justice of the Territorial Supreme Court of Hawaii from April 18, 1950, to April 6, 1956, serving as chief justice from October 15, 1951, to April 6, 1956.

Born in Honolulu, Hawaii. Towse graduated from Punahou School in 1925, receiving an undergraduate degree from the University of Hawaiʻi and a law degree from the University of Virginia School of Law.

In 1932, Towse was named an assistant United States Attorney for the District of Hawaii, serving until 1934. In 1949, he was appointed as a circuit court judge, and the following year he was elevated to an associate justice seat on the territorial supreme court. He was elevated to chief justice in 1951, serving in that capacity until 1956.

Towse died in San Mateo, California, after a long illness.

Political offices
Preceded by Samuel B. Kemp	Chief Justice of the Supreme Court of Hawaii; 1951–1956	Succeeded by Philip L. Rice
Preceded by Samuel B. Kemp	Associate Justice of the Supreme Court of Hawaii; 1950–1956	Succeeded by Ingram Stainback
