= Ralph P. Quarles =

American judge (1855–1921)

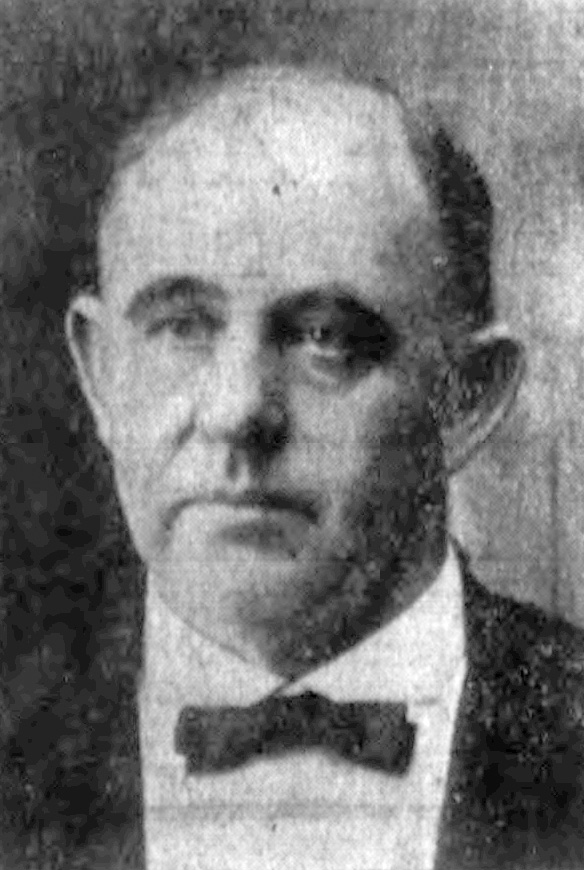
Ralph P. Quarles

Ralph Petty Quarles (June 10, 1855 – November 15, 1921) was an associate justice of the Idaho Supreme Court from 1897 to 1901, serving as Chief Justice of that court from 1901 to 1903, and later an associate justice of the Supreme Court of Hawaii from 1914 to 1918.

== Career ==
Born in Benton, Kentucky to James M. and Nancy Jane (Petty) Quarles, Quarles was raised in Paducah, passing through the Paducah high school and receiving some education at the Maury Academy. He read law to be admitted to the bar in 1877, practicing in McCracken County, Marshall County and Calloway County from November 1877 until October 1888, when he moved to Idaho. He first settled in Blackfoot, Idaho, but moved to Salmon, Idaho in August 1889, where he continued to practice law.

In 1896, Quarles was elected to the Idaho Supreme Court on the People's Democratic ticket, and became chief justice on January 7, 1901. After a serving in that capacity until 1903, he voluntarily retired from the bench to resume his private practice. He practiced in Boise, Idaho, from 1903 to 1908, and then moved to Honolulu, Hawaii, where he practiced until 1911, thereafter returning to Boise. In 1914, Quarles was nominated by President Woodrow Wilson to a seat as an associate justice of the Territorial Supreme Court of Hawaii, following the retirement of Justice Antonio Perry. He was confirmed by the United States Senate on March 25, 1914, and took his oath of office on April 2, 1914.

== Personal life ==
Quarles married Ida M. Strow, of Benton, Kentucky, on November 23, 1881, and together they had five children.

Political offices
Preceded by John T. Morgan (judge)	Justice of the Idaho Supreme Court; 1897–1903	Succeeded by James F. Ailshie
Preceded by Antonio Perry	Justice of the Territorial Supreme Court of Hawaii; 1914–1918	Succeeded by William S. Edings
