= Justice Lindsay =

Justice Lindsay may refer to:

- Alexander Lindsay Jr. (1871–1926), associate justice of the Supreme Court of Hawaii
- Livingston Lindsay (1806–1892), associate justice of the Texas Supreme Court
