= Arthur A. Wilder =

American judge (1873–1917)

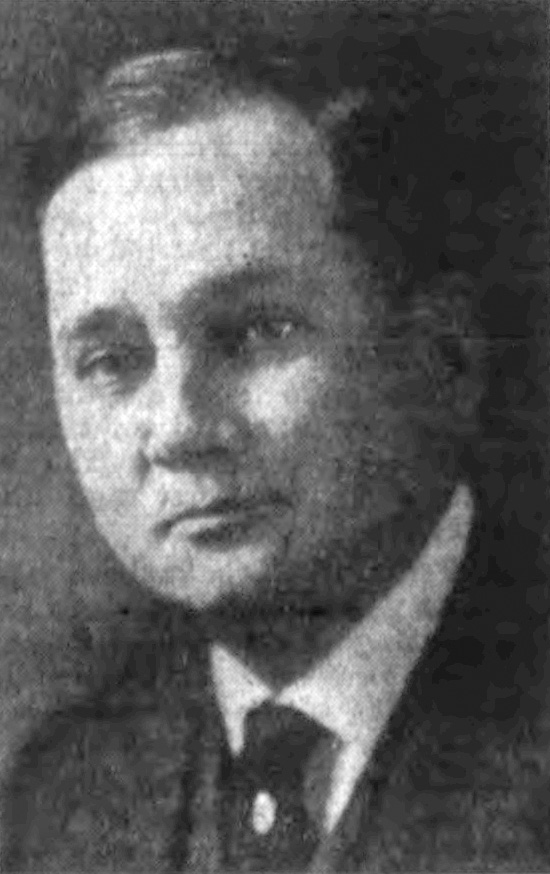
- Born: November 3, 1873; Honolulu
- Died: January 4, 1917 (aged 43)
- Education: Punahou School, Yale University
- Occupations: lawyer, judge
- Years active: 1898–1910
- Known for: Justice of the Supreme Court of Hawaii (1905–1910)
- Notable work: first secretary, Hawaii State Bar Association; assisted in the compilation of the Revised Laws of Hawaii
- Political party: Democratic
- Spouse: Jane K. Giffard (m. 1906; div. 1915)

Arthur Ashford Wilder (November 3, 1873 – January 4, 1917) was a justice of the Supreme Court of Hawaii from February 13, 1905 to January 25, 1910.

== Early life, education, and career ==
Born in Honolulu, Wilder attended that city's Fort Street school and the Punahou School, and then received a Bachelor of Laws from Yale University with high honors in 1897, and a Master of Laws in 1898.

From 1898 to 1905, Wilder practised law with A.G.M. Robertson. In 1899, he was one of the organizers if the Hawaii State Bar Association, being its first secretary, and in 1905 he assisted in the compilation of the Revised Laws of Hawaii.

== Judicial service and later career ==
In February 1905, at the age of thirty-one, Wilder was appointed to a seat on the Hawaii Supreme Court. In December 1909 he resigned from the bench, due to his inability to get along with other members of the court. His resignation took effect on January 25, 1910. Wilder then joined the law firm of Thompson & Clemons.

Although he was appointed to the court by a Republican president, Wilder was an ardent Democrat and in 1913 he was a candidate for the governorship of Hawaii. In 1910 he was appointed a regent of the College of Hawaii and in 1912 became a member of the park commission. In May 1914, Wilder caused controversy in Washington, D.C., when he filed charges against Jeff McCarn, the United States District Attorney in Honolulu, alleging that McCarn had tried to kill another attorney. In May 1916, Wilder filed charges against Hawaii Governor Lucius E. Pinkham, seeking to have Pinkham removed from office.

== Personal life and suicide ==
In February, 1906, Wilder married Jane K. Giffard. In 1915, while Wilder was visiting San Francisco, his wife filed for divorce in Honolulu.

Wilder committed suicide at 5:30 PM on Thursday, January 4, 1917, at the home of his cousin James A. Wilder. His body was found by an Oriental servant. He evidently had stood before a mirror when he fired the fatal shot. The servant immediately notified City Attorney Arthur M. Brown, who lived near the Wilder home. He had lived in seclusion for a prolonged period following his divorce, and while facing financial difficulties, leading, friends to express fears that he would take his own life.

Political offices
Preceded by Francis March Hatch	Justice of the Supreme Court of Hawaii; 1905–1909	Succeeded by Seat abolished.
