= Justice Wilder =

Justice Wilder may refer to:

- Arthur A. Wilder (1873–1917), associate justice of the Supreme Court of Hawaii
- Horace Wilder (1802–1889), associate justice of the Supreme Court of Ohio
- Kurtis T. Wilder (born 1959), associate justice of the Michigan Supreme Court
