= Attorney General Kemp =

Attorney General Kemp may refer to:

- Bolivar Edwards Kemp Jr. (1904–1965), Attorney General of Louisiana
- Joseph Horsford Kemp (1874–1950), Attorney General of Hong Kong
- Samuel B. Kemp (1871–1962), Attorney General of Hawaii
