= Eddings =

Eddings is a surname. Notable people with the surname include:

- David Eddings (1931–2009), American fantasy writer
- Doug Eddings (born 1968), American baseball umpire
- Floyd Eddings (born 1958), American football player
- John McNeil Eddings (1830-1896), Canadian military storekeeper and civic leader
- Leigh Eddings (1937–2007), American fantasy writer

== See also ==
- William S. Edings (1857–1927), justice of the Territorial Supreme Court of Hawaii
