= Louis LeBaron =

American judge (1898–1989)

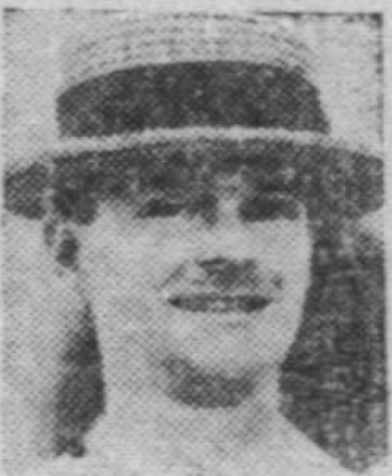

Louis LeBaron (1898 – March 30, 1989) was a justice of the Territorial Supreme Court of Hawaii from 1942 to 1955.

Born in San Jose, California, LeBaron received a B.A. from the University of California and a J.D. from Harvard Law School. He practiced law in Hawaii for eleven years before turning to judicial service, first serving as a District Court magistrate from 1935 to 1937.

On June 10, 1937, President Franklin D. Roosevelt nominated LeBaron to a seat on the newly established first circuit court of Hawaii. On March 2, 1942, Roosevelt elevated LeBaron to the Territorial Supreme Court, to the seat vacated by the elevation of Samuel B. Kemp to the position of chief justice.

In 1955, President Dwight D. Eisenhower declined to renominate LeBaron, a Democrat, to another term on the court, instead appointing Republican Circuit Court judge Philip L. Rice to the seat, prompting criticism from Associate Justice Ingram Stainback. Stainback also deemed it "cruel" that LeBaron was "let out without any trouble or compensation", though Rice expressed appreciation of LeBaron's courteous response to the situation. In 1957, LeBaron "set off a controversy" when he alleged in an annual review of the Bishop Estate that the practice of the Kamehameha Schools giving preference to the admission of students of part-Hawaiian ancestry constituted racial discrimination and unlawful segregation.

LeBaron died at The Queen's Medical Center at the age of 91, and was survived by his wife and two daughters.

Political offices
Preceded by Samuel B. Kemp	Justice of the Territorial Supreme Court of Hawaii; 1942–1955	Succeeded by Philip L. Rice
