= George Morison Robertson =

American judge (1821–1867)

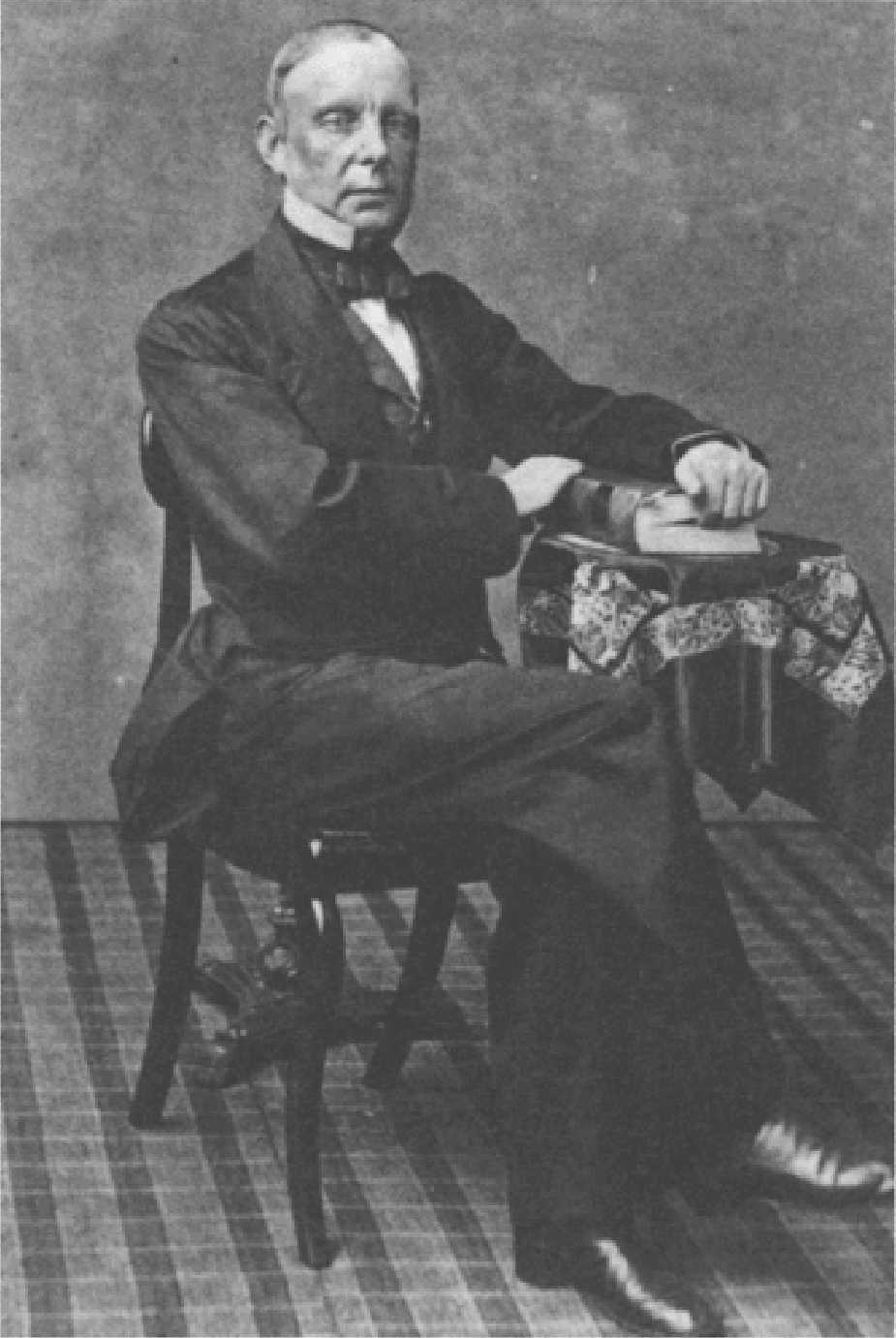

Speaker of the House of Representatives
- In office 1852–1853
- Preceded by: William Little Lee
- Succeeded by: Asa G. Thurston
- In office 1855 – January 3, 1859
- Preceded by: Asa G. Thurston
- Succeeded by: James W. Austin

Associate Justice of the Supreme Court of Hawaii
- In office January 10, 1855 – December 24, 1863
- Appointed by: Kamehameha III
- In office February 16, 1864 – March 12, 1867
- Appointed by: Kamehameha V

Minister of the Interior
- In office December 24, 1863 – February 16, 1864
- Monarch: Kamehameha V
- Preceded by: Lot Kapuāiwa (Kamehameha V)
- Succeeded by: Charles Gordon Hopkins

Personal details
- Born: February 26, 1821 Huntly, Aberdeenshire, Scotland
- Died: March 12, 1867 (aged 46) Waianae, Oahu, Kingdom of Hawaii
- Spouse: Sarah Symonds Humphreys
- Children: 7

George Morison Robertson (February 26, 1821 – March 12, 1867) was an early politician and judge in the Kingdom of Hawaii. Born in Scotland, he settled in Hawaii in 1844 during the whaling era. During his career in Hawaii, he served in many political and judicial posts including circuit judge and police court judge, member of the Board of Commissioners to Quiet Land Titles, a multiple-term representative in the Hawaiian legislature, Speaker of the House of Representatives, Associate Justice of the Supreme Court of Hawaii and Minister of the Interior.

== Life and career ==
George Morison Robertson was born on February 26, 1821, at Huntly, Aberdeenshire, Scotland. His parents were John Robertson and Anne Morison. At the age of fifteen, he settled in Saint John, New Brunswick, Canada with his older brother.

Robertson arrived in Hawaii in 1844 aboard the British whaling ship Peruvian. He was discharged and settled in Honolulu where he worked as a clerk in the firm of Skinner & Company. There he caught the attention of Robert Crichton Wyllie, a Scottish expatriate and Minister of Foreign Affairs, who recommended him to the Hawaiian government where he worked as Wyllie's assistant in the foreign ministry and later as a cashier and bookkeeper in the treasury department under Finance Minister Gerrit P. Judd. In July 1848, he briefly served as interim or acting Minister of the Interior in the absence of Interior Minister Keoni Ana.

In 1849, he took part briefly in the California Gold Rush but returned without much success after a year. He settled permanently in Hawaii and accepted an appointment as a member of the Board of Commissioners to Quiet Land Titles, succeeding Samuel Kamakau. The body was a government committee in charge of settling or quieting land claims of the Great Māhele. During his tenure from 1850 to 1855, he was responsible for the awarding of many of the present land titles in Hawaii and the distribution of kuleana lands to the commoners. At the same time, he also served as police court judge for Honolulu and circuit court judge of the island of Hawaii.

Robertson was also elected as a member of the House of Representatives in the Legislature of the Kingdom of Hawaii from 1851 to 1859. The legislative election of 1851 was the first in Hawaii in which direct suffrage was introduced. Robertson and another naturalized foreigner, Thomas Charles Byde Rooke, were able to defeat the Native Hawaiian candidates for the representative seats in the district of Kona in Honolulu, despite the fact that a majority of the ballots cast were by Hawaiians. He served as the Speaker of the House of Representatives from 1852 to 1859.

Robertson was appointed to the Supreme Court of Hawaii in 1855 to succeed Lorrin Andrews. He served as the inaugural Associate Justice of the Supreme Court of Hawaii from January 1, 1855, to December 24, 1863. He left his justice seat briefly to serve in the cabinet of King Kamehameha V as his Minister of the Interior from December 24, 1863, to February 16, 1864. However, unable to find a suitable replacement for his justice seat, the king reappointed him to the Supreme Court from February 16, 1864, to his death on March 12, 1867.

On April 11, 1865, King Kamehameha V made him a Knight Commander of the Royal Order of Kamehameha I.

== Personal life ==
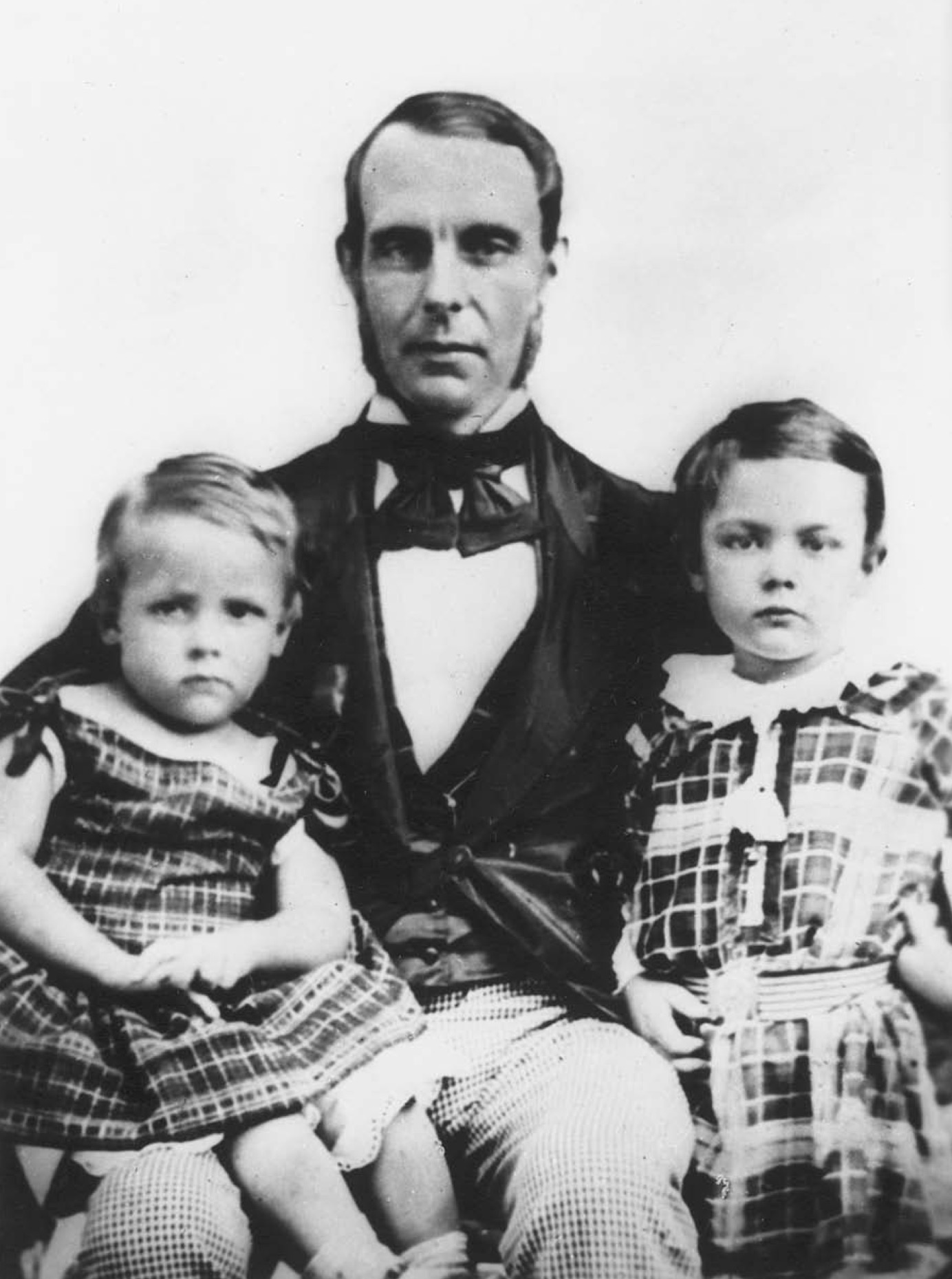
George Morison Robertson and his sons: James and George

In 1851, George Morison Robertson married Sarah Symonds Humphreys, an Englishwoman from Brighton who was shipwrecked with her family at Waikiki while they were traveling to the California Gold Rush from Australia. They had seven children including three sons and four daughters:

1. James William Robertson, who served as chamberlain to King Kalākaua and Queen Liliuokalani.
2. George Humphreys Robertson, who became vice president of C. Brewer & Co.
3. Elizabeth Robertson
4. Florence Robertson
5. Margaret Ann Robertson
6. Grace Gordon Robertson
7. Alexander G. M. Robertson, who served as Chief Justice of the Hawaii Supreme Court from 1911 to 1918 and married opera singer Ululani McQuaid

Robertson was initially a Presbyterian, the religion he was brought up in, and worshiped at the Seamen's Bethel Church under Reverend Samuel C. Damon. He later joined the Anglican Church of Hawaii in 1862 at the request of King Kamehameha IV who wanted him as a supporter for the new Christian denomination. Robertson helped lay the cornerstone for the St. Andrew's Cathedral during the reign of Kamehameha V.

== Death ==
While on a vacation to Waianae with his eldest son James, Robertson stayed the night at the home of a Mr. Mahelona. He had been complaining of heart and rheumatic problems for the past few months. While reading a newspaper there, he fell unconscious and died of an aortic aneurysm, on March 12, 1867, at the age of forty-six. His funeral service was conducted at St. Andrew's Cathedral and he was given a state funeral at the expense of the government. The king, the court, government and diplomatic officials, Honolulu residents and officers of the USS Lackawanna took part in the funeral procession. He was buried in the Oahu Cemetery.

His obituary in The Pacific Commercial Advertiser noted: "Judge Robertson’s death will be a great loss to the community, but especially to the government, in which he was a wise counselor and an impartial, upright judge. Native Hawaiians always found in him a kind friend and adviser, and learned to trust to his wisdom. It will be impossible to fill the vacant judgeship with a man of the same varied qualifications, for there is no one living possessed of the knowledge of the native language combined with the firmness, impartiality and virtue which he had."

== Honours ==
- Knight Commander of the Royal Order of Kamehameha I.

== Bibliography ==
- Gregg, David L. (1982). King, Pauline (ed.). The Diaries of David Lawrence Gregg: An American Diplomat in Hawaii, 1853–1858. Honolulu: Hawaiian Historical Society. ISBN 9780824808617. OCLC 8773139.
- Hall, Dale E. (1992). "Two Hawaiian Careers in Grand Opera". The Hawaiian Journal of History. 26. Honolulu: Hawaiian Historical Society: 165–183. hdl:10524/618. OCLC 60626541.
- Hawaii (1918). Lydecker, Robert Colfax (ed.). Roster Legislatures of Hawaii, 1841–1918. Honolulu: Hawaiian Gazette Company. OCLC 60737418.
- Moffat, Riley Moore; Fitzpatrick, Gary L. (1995). Surveying the Mahele: Mapping the Hawaiian Land Revolution. Honolulu: Editions Limited. ISBN 978-0-915013-17-3. OCLC 33045472.
- Osorio, Jon Kamakawiwoʻole (2002). Dismembering Lāhui: A History of the Hawaiian Nation to 1887. Honolulu: University of Hawaii Press. ISBN 0-8248-2549-7. OCLC 48579247.
- Siddall, John William (1917). Men of Hawaii. Vol. 1. Honolulu: Honolulu Star-Bulletin. OCLC 16326675.
- Siddall, John William (1921). Men of Hawaii. Vol. 2. Honolulu: Honolulu Star-Bulletin. OCLC 16326675.
- Spaulding, Thomas Marshall (1930). "Early Years of the Hawaiian Legislature". Thirty-Eighth Annual Report of the Hawaiian Historical Society for the Year 1929. Honolulu: Hawaiian Historical Society: 25–33. hdl:10524/33. OCLC 2105039.
- Van Dyke, Jon M. (2008). Who Owns the Crown Lands of Hawaiʻi?. Honolulu: University of Hawaii Press. ISBN 978-0-8248-6560-3. OCLC 257449971 – via Project MUSE.
- Waldron, Else (1967). Honolulu 100 Years Ago. Honolulu: Fisher Print Company. OCLC 433915.
