= Sidney M. Ballou =

American judge (1870–1929)

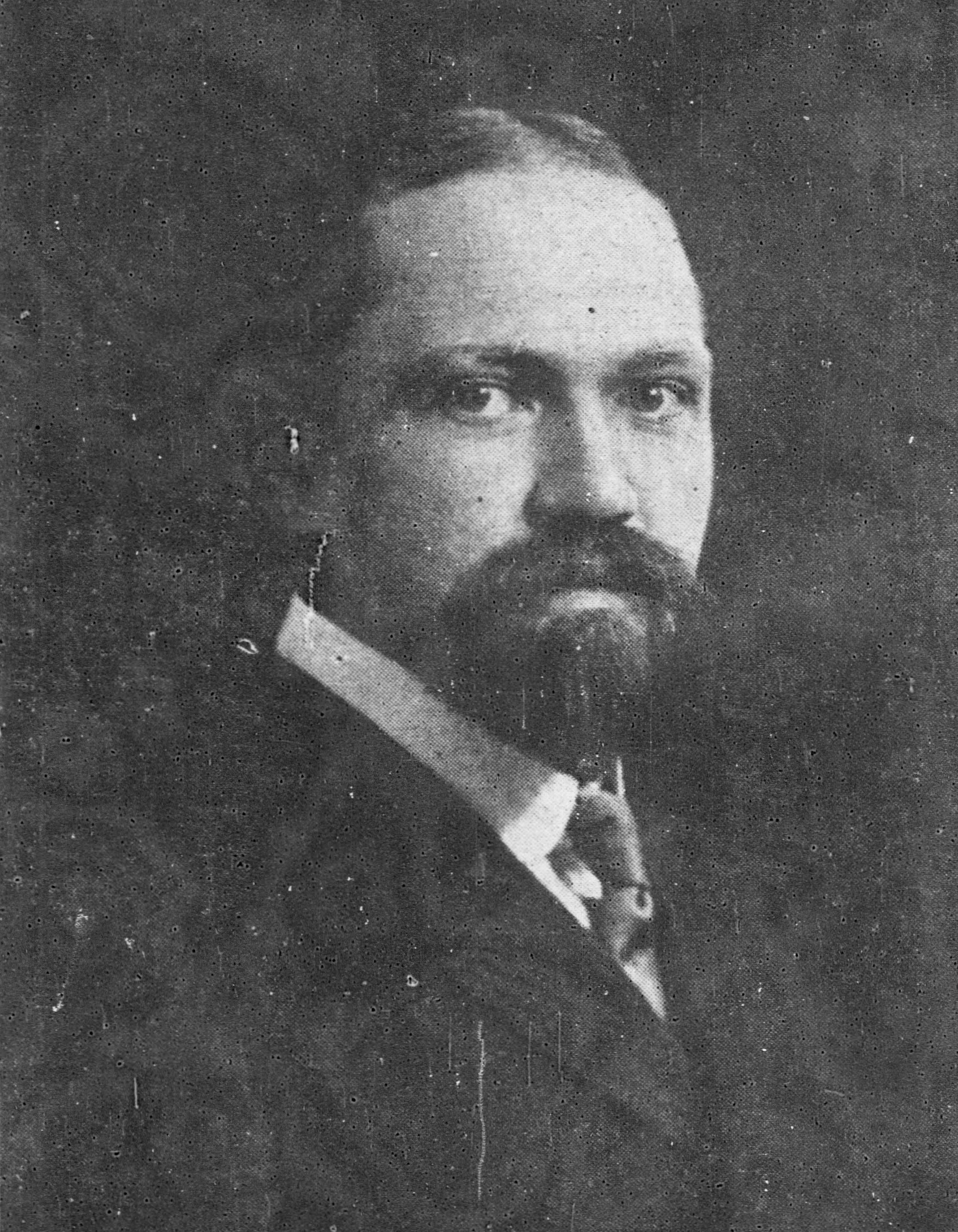
- In The Pacific Commercial Advertiser in 1907
- In office August 15, 1907 – May 6, 1909

Personal details
- Born: October 24, 1870 Providence, Rhode Island, US
- Died: October 29, 1929 (aged 59) New York, New York, US
- Resting place: Arlington National Cemetery

Sidney Miller Ballou (October 24, 1870 – October 29, 1929) was an associate justice of the Supreme Court of Hawaii from August 15, 1907 to May 6, 1909, and author of various pamphlets on scientific, naval, legal, and economic subjects. He compiled the civil and penal laws of Hawaii in 1897.

== Early life ==
At Harvard, c. 1893

Born in Providence, Rhode Island, Ballou attended the public schools of Boston and graduated from Harvard College in 1893, thereafter attending Harvard Law School.

== Career in Hawaii ==
By 1895, he had moved to Honolulu, Hawaii. Ballou compiled the civic laws of Hawaii, and in 1907 was appointed as an associate justice of the Supreme Court of Hawaii, to succeed Alfred S. Hartwell, who had been elevated to Chief Justice of that court. Ballou resigned his judgeship in 1911 to resume the private practice of law, where he was retained as the representative of the American sugar companies in Hawaii, "a post as important as that of senator" due to the central importance of that industry to the territory.

Ballou also represented Liliuokalani, former Queen of the Kingdom of Hawaii, in a claim against the United States. In addition to his legal practice, Ballou was "a recognized authority on naval affairs and has appeared before National Conventions to deliver addresses on the naval strength and defense of the Pacific".

== Personal life ==
Ballou married Lucia Burnett, a native of California, on July 27, 1907.

Ballou died of a heart attack in New York on October 29, 1929.

Ballou is interred at Arlington National Cemetery.

Political offices
Preceded by Alfred S. Hartwell	Justice of the Supreme Court of Hawaii; 1907–1909	Succeeded by Antonio Perry
