= Robert Grimes Davis =

American judge (1819–1872)

- Robert Grimes Davis

Associate Justice of the Kingdom of Hawaii Supreme Court
- In office February 16, 1864 – July 8, 1868
- Appointed by: Kamehameha V
- Preceded by: John Papa ʻĪʻī
- Succeeded by: James W. Austin

Personal details
- Born: May 10, 1819 Honolulu, Kingdom of Hawaii
- Died: March 4, 1872 (aged 52) Honolulu, Hawaii
- Resting place: Oahu Cemetery
- Spouse(s): Harriet Swain Hammett; Maria Sumner Sea
- Relations: William Heath Davis (brother), Samuel Wilder King (grandson)
- Children: Elizabeth J., William Heath, Charles Hammett, and Charlotte Holmes, Maria & Robert C. W. Davis
- Occupation: Merchant, Lawyer, Judge, Civil Servant, Consul

Robert Grimes Davis (May 10, 1819 – March 4, 1872) was an early lawyer and judge of the Kingdom of Hawaii who served many different posts for Hawaii and the Republic of Peru. He was also known as Lopaka, the Hawaiian version of Robert.

== Life ==
Davis was born in 1819, in Honolulu to Captain William Heath Davis, Sr. and Hannah Holmes Davis, a daughter of Oliver Holmes, Governor of Oahu. His father, who arrived in Hawaii in 1812, was a Boston ship captain and one of the pioneer merchants of the sandalwood trade in the islands. He was given his middle name after Captain Eliab Grimes, a close friend of his father who was also once a privateer in the War of 1812. His younger brother was William Heath Davis, Jr., who was an early settler of San Diego. Davis and his younger brother were one-quarter Hawaiian from their maternal grandmother Mahi Kalanihooulumokuikekai, a high chiefess from the Koʻolau district of Oʻahu. After his father's death on November 26, 1822, Hannah Holmes remarried to another American merchant John Coffin Jones, who took the five-year-old Davis back to Boston in 1825. In the United States, he was given "a classical education" and raised in the household of an uncle who was a wealthy merchant in Boston, remaining there until he completed his schooling. He traveled for a time in Europe where he acquired the ability to speak French, Spanish and German. For a time, he was a clerk on the Boston merchant ship Monsoon which traded in Monterrey and Yerba Buena (now San Francisco). He returned to Honolulu and went into the mercantile business, trading between Hawaii and California.

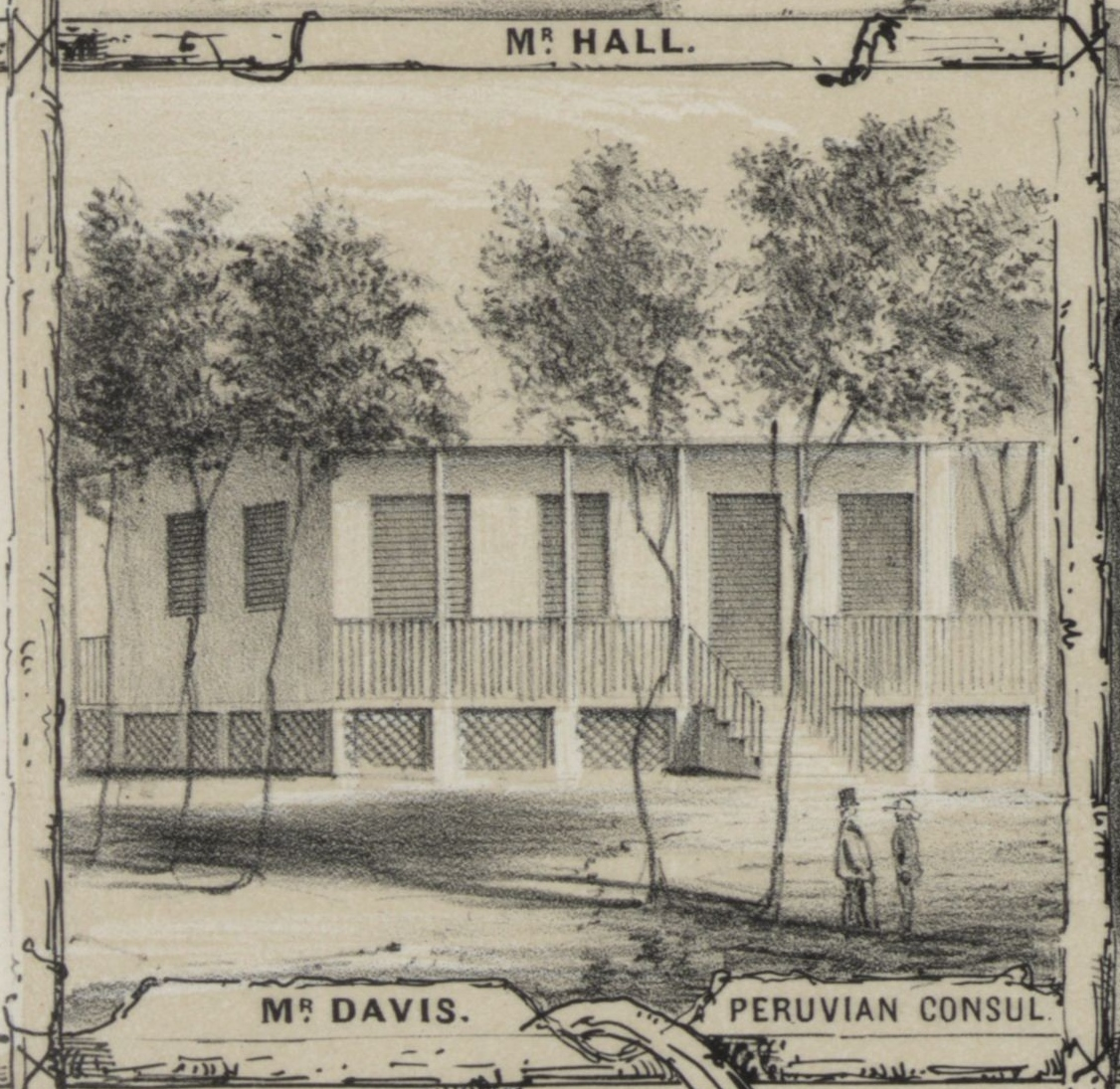
Residence of Robert G. Davis in 1853, lithographed by Paul Emmert.

In 1850, Davis was appointed Peruvian Consul General to Hawaii by President Ramón Castilla succeeding James F. B. Marshall, who had resigned. He would hold this position for much of the 1850s. Davis resigned his post as Peruvian Consul upon his appointment as Police Magistrate of Honolulu in 1859. Davis also served many governmental posts for the Kingdom of Hawaii. He served as Commission of Customs in 1853, Police Magistrate of Honolulu in 1859 and briefly served as a member of the House of Representatives, the lower house of the Hawaiian legislature, during the session of 1855. He was also a member of the Privy Council from 1863 to 1865 under the reign of Kamehameha V. In 1852, he began studying law and shortly after became a well read lawyer. He also was appointed to succeed John Papa ʻĪʻī as the Second Associate Justice of the Supreme Court of Hawaii from February 16, 1864, until his resignation on July 8, 1868. Serving alongside Chief Justice Elisha Hunt Allen and First Associate Justice George Morison Robertson, the effectiveness of the three men's terms in office were considered highly by their contemporaries. In 1873, a writer in the Hawaiian newspaper The Advertiser stated:

The years during which the Bench was occupied by the present Chief Justice with Judges Robertson and Davis as Associates, may justly be regarded as comprising me most satisfactory period in the history of our jurisprudence. These three legal minds, not each excelling in just the same points, combined to give us a Bench of a Court of law. The decisions of the full Court were then the decisions of three legal men, and were settled and founded on legal argument and authorities. In proof of this statement, it is satisfactory to know that the dicta of our Court during that period have been more than once quoted m foreign forums.

During his time in office, he would also published Volume II of Hawaiian Law Reports. Between 1868 and 1869, after his term as Associate Justice, Davis and Richard H. Stanley served on a commission which compiled and translated the Penal Code of the Hawaiian Kingdom into Hawaiian and English.

Davis married on March 23, 1843, to his cousin Harriet Swain Hammett (died 1858), daughter of Captain Charles H. Hammatt (spelling varied) and Charlotte Holmes, with whom he had four children Elizabeth J., William Heath, Charles Hammett, and Charlotte Holmes Lelepoki Davis. He married secondly on August 1, 1862, to Maria Sumner Sea (1824–1908), daughter of Captain William Sumner and the widow of Henry Sea, with whom he had Maria and Robert Crichton Wyllie "Wally" Davis. His daughter Charlotte married James A. King making Davis the grandfather of Samuel Wilder King, who became Governor of the Territory of Hawaii 1953–1957 and was the first person of Native Hawaiian descent to become governor.

He died on March 4, 1872, in Honolulu after suffering for several months from the dropsy. After his death, Davis was buried at Oahu Cemetery.

== Bibliography ==
- "21. William L. Lee to J. Turrill Honolulu, March 24, 1852: The Turrill Collection, 1845–1860". Annual Report of the Hawaiian Historical Society (66). Honolulu: Hawaiian Historical Society: 27–92. 1958. hdl:10524/64.
- Davis, William Heath (1889). Sixty Years in California: A History of Events and Life in California; Personal, Political and Military, Under the Mexican Regime; During the Quasi-military Government of the Territory by the United States, and After the Admission of the State Into the Union, Being a Compilation by a Witness of the Events Described. San Francisco: A.J. Leary.
- Day, Arthur Grove (1984). History Makers of Hawaii: a Biographical Dictionary. Honolulu: Mutual Publishing. ISBN 0935180095.
- Forbes, David W., ed. (2001). Hawaiian National Bibliography, 1780–1900. Vol. 3. Honolulu: University of Hawaii Press. pp. 11, 390. ISBN 0-8248-2503-9.
- Gast, Ross H. (1976). Contentious Consul: a Biography of John Coffin Jones, First United States Consular Agent at Hawaii. Los Angeles: Dawson's Book Shop. ISBN 978-0-87093-175-8.
- Goodale, Warren (1897). "Honolulu in 1853". Papers of the Hawaiian Historical Society (10). Honolulu: Hawaiian Historical Society. hdl:10524/969. OCLC 35025433.
- Gregg, David Lawrence (1982) [1853–1858]. King, Pauline (ed.). The Diaries of David Lawrence Gregg: an American Diplomat in Hawaii, 1853–1858. Honolulu: Hawaiian Historical Society. ISBN 9780824808617.
- Hammatt, Charles H. (1999). Wagner-Wright, Sandra (ed.). Ships, Furs, and Sandalwood: A Yankee Trader in Hawai'i, 1823-1825. Honolulu: University of Hawaii Press. ISBN 978-0-8248-2258-3. OCLC 245815516.
- Hawaii (1918). Lydecker, Robert Colfax (ed.). Roster Legislatures of Hawaii, 1841–1918. Honolulu: Hawaiian Gazette Company.
- Hawaii Supreme Court (1916). Thayer, Wade Warren; Lydecker, Robert Colfax (eds.). A Digest of the Decisions of the Supreme Court of Hawaii: Volumes 1 to 22 Inclusive, January 6, 1847, to October 7, 1915. Honolulu: Paradise of the Pacific Press.
- Hawaii Supreme Court; Davis, Robert G. (1866). Reports of a Portion of the Decisions Rendered by the Supreme Court of the Hawaiian Islands, in Law, Equity, Admiralty and Probate, 1857–1865. By Robert G. Davis. Honolulu: Government Press.
- Hawaii Supreme Court (1869). Davis, Robert G.; Stanley, Richard H. (eds.). The Penal Code of the Hawaiian Kingdom: Compiled from the Penal Code of 1850 and the Various Penal Enactments Since Made, Pursuant to Act of the Legislative Assembly, June 22d, 1868. Honolulu: Government Press.
- Kuykendall, Ralph Simpson (1965) [1938]. The Hawaiian Kingdom 1778–1854, Foundation and Transformation. Vol. 1. Honolulu: University of Hawaii Press. ISBN 0-87022-431-X.
- Osorio, Jon Kamakawiwoʻole (2002). Dismembering Lāhui: A History of the Hawaiian Nation to 1887. Honolulu: University of Hawaii Press. ISBN 0-8248-2549-7.
- Piercy, LaRue W. (1985). Hawaii, Truth Stranger Than Fiction. Kailua-Kona, HI: L. W. Piercy. ISBN 9781566470629.
- Rolle, Andrew F. (1956). An American in California: the biography of William Heath Davis, 1822–1909. San Marino, CA: Huntington Library. ISBN 9780873281201.
- Tomonari-Tuggle, Myra J.; Arakaki, Tom (2014). Mōkapu: A Paradise on the Peninsula : Stories from Not So Long Ago (PDF). Honolulu: International Archaeological Research Institute, Incorporated. Archived from the original (PDF) on March 3, 2016.
