= Richard F. Bickerton =

American judge

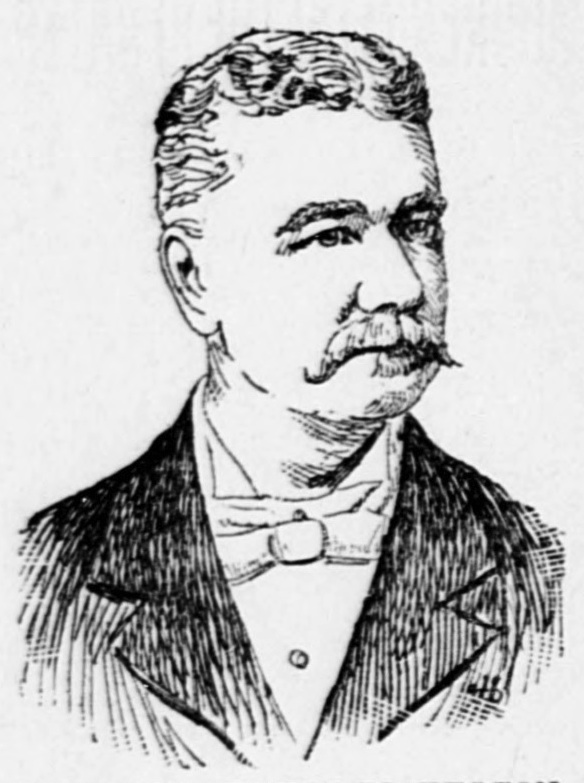
- Born: April 3, 1844; Greenwich, London, England
- Died: December 12, 1895 (aged 51); Honolulu, Republic of Hawaii (now Hawaii)
- Occupation: Justice of the Supreme Court of Hawaii

Richard Frederick Bickerton (April 3, 1844 – December 12, 1895) was a British-born associate justice of the Supreme Court of Hawaii and a member of Liliʻuokalani's Privy Council of State. He served one term as a legislative representative from Hamakua on the island of Hawaii.

== Background ==
A native of Greenwich, London, England, his family later relocated to Melbourne, Australia. As a young adult, he spent two years traveling and working in New Zealand, Tahiti and North America. A one-year stay in San Francisco garnered letters of recommendation for Bickerton. Afterwards, during what was intended as only a brief stopover in Honolulu, he became acquainted with merchant William Lowthian Green, who helped him get a job at Kaalaea Plantation on Oahu, where Bickerton rose to position of manager. He eventually also managed Kalaia Plantation and Wailua Plantation.

Bickerton went bankrupt in a business venture, and changed his career path by studying law while in the employ of W. Claude Jones. He was admitted to the Hawaiian bar May 31, 1877, and opened his own practice in Honolulu.

== Elected and appointed office ==
Bickerton was elected in 1878 for one term as legislative representative from Hamakua on the island of Hawaii.

In 1882, he was appointed Judge of the First District of Oahu, and in 1884 was appointed Police Justice of Honolulu. He was commissioned Third Associate of the Hawaii supreme court in December 1886. Upon the death of justice Edward Preston on January 17, 1890, Bickerton replaced him as Second Associate Judge.

After the death and funeral of Liliʻuokalani's brother Kalākaua, she demanded the resignation of his entire cabinet. The ministers stonewalled, and took their case to the supreme court. On February 25, 1891, Chief Justice Albert Francis Judd, and associate justices Bickerton and Sanford B. Dole, were in concurrence with the queen, with associate justice Lawrence McCully dissenting. The queen had a new cabinet in place the same day as the supreme court ruling. Liliuokalani appointed Bickerton to her privy council of state on March 7, 1891.

== Family and final years ==
Bickerton was a widower with three children when he married Australian Frances T. Spencer, who also had a child with him. He died of pneumonia on December 12, 1895, and was buried at Nuuanu cemetery.

Rev. Alex Mackintosh of Saint Andrew's Cathedral officiated over the services in the Bickerton home, followed by a cortege befitting a member of the highest level of government. Justices of the supreme court marched along with Republic of Hawaii president Sanford B. Dole and members of the government cabinet, escorted by the Honolulu police. At the Executive Building (Iolani Palace), the cortege was joined by a military escort. The Royal Hawaiian Band, renamed the "Government Band" after the overthrow of the monarchy, provided the music. The general public was invited to join the cortege alongside representatives of the domestic and counselor corps. Pall bearers were the dean of the consular corps Frederick A. Schaefer, William Fessenden Allen, judges William Austin Whiting and John Alfred Magoon, diplomat H. A. Widermann, minister of foreign affairs Henry E. Cooper, as well as Alfred S. Hartwell, Cecil Brown, Henry Smith, S. K. Ka-ne, George C. Ross, Lorrin A. Thurston, and dean of the counselor corps Frederick A. Schaefer.

== Bibliography ==
- Kuykendall, Ralph Simpson (1967). The Hawaiian Kingdom 1874–1893, The Kalakaua Dynasty. Vol. 3. Honolulu: University of Hawaii Press. ISBN 978-0-87022-433-1. OCLC 500374815.
- Liliuokalani (1898). Hawaii's Story by Hawaii's Queen, Liliuokalani. Boston: Lee and Shepard. ISBN 978-0-548-22265-2. OCLC 2387226 – via HathiTrust.
- Lydecker, Robert C. (1918). Rosters of Legislatures of Hawaii 1841–1918. The Honolulu Gazette Col., Ltd.
