= Alexander George Morison Robertson =

American judge (1867–1947)

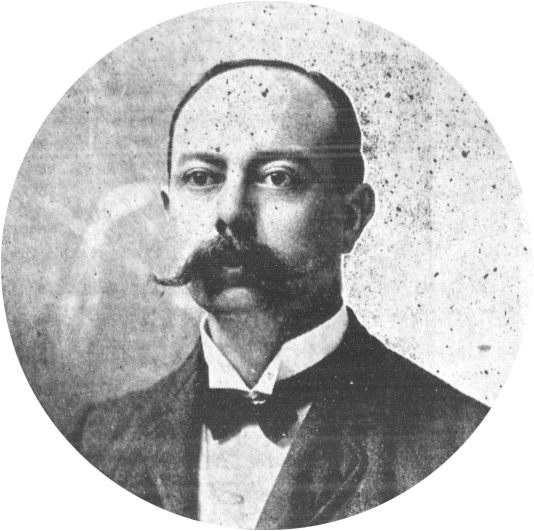
Alexander G. M. Robertson

Alexander George Morison Robertson (September 3, 1867 – August 21, 1947) was chief justice of the Supreme Court of Hawaii from March 9, 1911 to January 1, 1918.

Robertson was the son of George Morison Robertson, "a distinguished associate justice of the Hawaii Supreme Court", and Robertson "maintained family tradition as an outstanding jurist". On February 9, 1888, Robertson became a second lieutenant in the Honolulu Rifles division, later becoming a captain of the Hawaiian Volunteers, First Battalion.

From August 12, 1893 Robertson became a District Magistrate in Honolulu, serving in this capacity until May 29, 1894. In 1894, he became Deputy Attorney General of the Republic of Hawaii, and "was a delegate to the Hawaiian Constitutional Convention and served as a member of Governor Dole's staff". He was elected to the Hawaiian House of Representatives for three terms, serving from 1895 to 1901.

In 1910, President William Howard Taft appointed Robertson to be the territorial United States district judge for Hawaii. On March 9, 1911, Robertson was appointed Chief Justice of the Hawaii Supreme Court. He was reappointed on August 5, 1915. He announced his resignation from the court on December 10, 1917, effective January 1, 1918. He returned to private practice, but returned to public service decades later, serving on the Hawaii Equal Rights Commission from November 19, 1942 to July 1, 1947.

He married May 29, 1907 to Hawaiian opera singer Ululani McQuaid (1890–1970).

Political offices
Preceded by Alfred S. Hartwell	Chief Justice of the Supreme Court of Hawaii; 1911–1918	Succeeded by Samuel B. Kemp
