= Bert T. Kobayashi =

American judge (1916–2005)

Justice of the Supreme Court of Hawaii
- In office 1969–1978
- Preceded by: Jack Mizuha
- Succeeded by: Herman T. F. Lum

Attorney General of Hawaii
- In office 1962–1969
- Preceded by: Shiro Kashiwa
- Succeeded by: Bertram Kanbara

Personal details
- Born: July 8, 1916 Territory of Hawaii, U.S.
- Died: October 6, 2005 (aged 89)
- Spouse(s): Victoria Tsuchiya (c. 1941)
- Children: 4

Bert Takaaki Kobayashi Sr. (Japanese: 小林 孝明, July 8, 1916 – October 6, 2005) was a justice of the Supreme Court of Hawaii from July 17, 1969, to December 29, 1978.

Kobayashi was born in 1916 to Japanese immigrant parents. He attended President William McKinley High School, graduating in 1935. He attended Gettysburg College in Pennsylvania, and Harvard Law School.

In 1962, Governor John Burns appointed Kobayashi Attorney General of Hawaii, after Kobayashi turned down a previous offer from Burns to run as his lieutenant governor. Burns appointed Kobayashi to the state supreme court in 1969. Kobayashi retired from the court in 1978 and returned to private practice. He was also a law partner of former Governor George Ariyoshi.

Kobayashi and his wife, Victoria Tsuchiya, had four children, including lawyers Bert T. Kobayashi Jr. and Josephine L. Chang, and Dr. Lincoln K. Kobayashi and Dr. Victoria P. Kobayashi.

Political offices
Preceded by Jack Mizuha	Justice of the Supreme Court of Hawaii; 1969–1978	Succeeded by Herman T. F. Lum
