= Clinton A. Galbraith =

American judge (1860–1923)

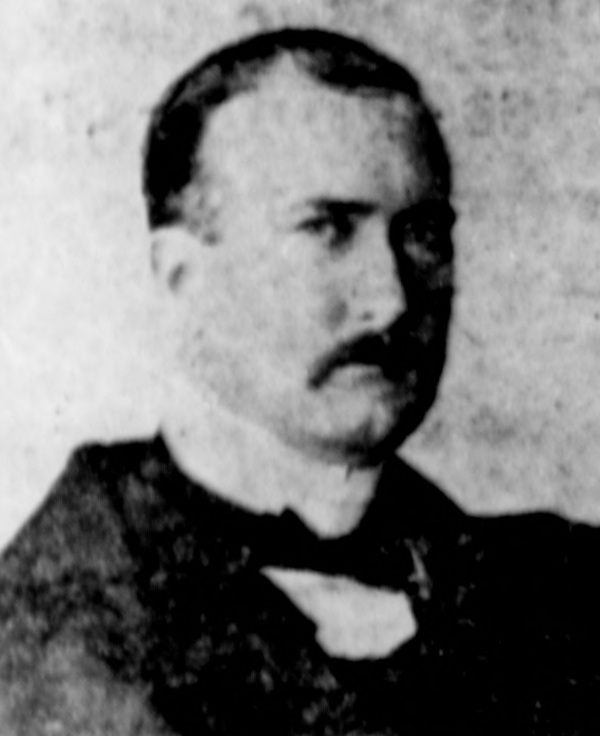
Galbraith c. early 1900

Clinton Alexander Galbraith (March 6, 1860 – May 27, 1923) was an American lawyer and judge who served as attorney general of Oklahoma Territory and later as an associate justice of the Territorial Supreme Court of Hawaii from June 30, 1900 to June 15, 1904. After returning to Oklahoma, he held several legal posts including assistant attorney general of the state of Oklahoma.

== Early life, education, and career ==
Born in Hartsville, Indiana, to S. Joseph William Galbraith and Catherine Elizabeth (McAllister) Galbraith, he received his undergraduate degree from Hartsville College in 1883, and matriculated at the University of Michigan Law School in Ann Arbor. He gained admission to the bar in 1885. After leaving Michigan, Galbraith moved to Texas and began practicing law in Terrell in partnership with J. O. Terrell, then briefly practiced in Fort Worth.

In April 1889 he participated in the Land Run of 1889, arriving on one of the first trains and settling in Oklahoma City. Active in Democratic Party organizing in the territory, he was president of the Cleveland Democratic Club in Oklahoma City in the early 1890s. In 1893, Governor William Cary Renfrow appointed Galbraith as attorney general of Oklahoma Territory, in which office he served until 1897.

== Judicial service and later life ==
In 1898 Galbraith moved to the Hawaiian Islands and established a law practice as a partner of J. A. Magoon. He later moved to Hilo, Hawaii, and following the establishment of the Territory of Hawaii, President William McKinley appointed Galbraith as an associate justice of the territorial supreme court in 1900. Galbraith served in that capacity from June 30, 1900, to June 15, 1904. Galbraith was also active in local civic and fraternal life in Hawaii and is credited with founding a chapter of the Order of the Eastern Star in Hilo.

After completing his judicial term in Hawaii, Galbraith returned to Oklahoma. As of 1911 he was living in Ada, Oklahoma, and was selected as an Oklahoma delegate to the Pan-Pacific Congress in Honolulu in February 1912.

In his final years he served as a state supreme court commissioner, presiding judge of the second division, and finally as an assistant attorney general of Oklahoma, in which office he was serving at the time of his death.

== Personal life and death ==
On December 22, 1886, Galbraith married Nova Harmon in Terrell, Texas. The couple had no children.

Galbraith died suddenly of a heart attack in Oklahoma City at the age of 63, and was buried there.

Political offices
| Preceded by Newly established seat | Justice of the Supreme Court of Hawaii; 1900–1904 | Succeeded by Alfred S. Hartwell |
