= Jack Mizuha =

American judge (1913–1986)

Jack Hifuo Mizuha
- 水羽 日米男

Justice of the Supreme Court of Hawaii

Attorney General of Hawaii

Circuit Court judge

Personal details
- Born: November 5, 1913 Waihee, Maui
- Died: September 7, 1986 (aged 72)
- Party: Republican
- Spouse: Toshiko Sueoka
- Children: 1

Jack Hifuo Mizuha (Japanese: 水羽 日米男, November 5, 1913 – September 7, 1986) was an educator, soldier, and judge. He was a member of the 442nd Infantry Regiment, and served as the Attorney General of Hawaii from 1958 to 1959, a Circuit Court judge from 1959 to 1961, and a justice of the Supreme Court of Hawaii from 1961 to 1968. He was a Republican.

== Early life ==
Mizuha was born on November 5, 1913, in Waihee, Maui to immigrants from Hiroshima, Japan. He graduated from Maui High School and the University of Hawaiʻi, where he studied business and economics. He was a member of the Army Reserve Officers' Training Corps (AROTC) while he was in school, and ultimately became a lieutenant in the Hawaii National Guard. While studying for his master's degree in education, he worked as a police reporter with Jack Burns. After graduation, Mizuha became a teacher at Waimea High School, where he met his wife, Toshiko Sueoka. They had one child.

== Career ==
Mizuha was called to active duty in 1939, and served in the 299th Infantry Regiment. He was in charge of the Burns airfield in Kauai, and was part of the military response to the Niihau Incident. After the bombing of Pearl Harbor and the subsequent formation of the 442nd Infantry Regiment, he was put in command of the unit's Company D. They were sent to fight in Italy, where Mizuha was wounded on his back and neck. While in recovery, he wrote many letters defending the loyalty of Japanese American soldiers. He eventually was invited to meet with Eleanor Roosevelt at the White House to discuss them.

Once he had recovered from his injury, Mizuha returned to Hawaii and got a job as a principal at Hanamaulu School in Kauai. He also regularly spoke about civil rights and the "Americanization" of Japanese Americans. He then decided to use his GI Bill to study law at the University of Michigan. After graduation, he returned to Hawaii and in 1948 was elected to the Kauai Board of Supervisors. He also served as a delegate to the 1950 territorial constitutional convention.

In 1958, Mizuha became the Attorney General of Hawaii. Then, in 1959 he was appointed as a judge to the Circuit Court. Finally, on April 28, 1961, Mizuha was promoted to the Hawaii Supreme Court. He served until June 28, 1969, then retired and returned to his law practice.

Mizuha died on September 7, 1986.

Legal offices
| Preceded by Herbert Young Cho Choy | Attorney General of Hawaii; 1958–1959 | Succeeded by Shiro Kashiwa |
| Preceded by Masaji Marumoto | Justice of the Supreme Court of Hawaii; 1961–1969 | Succeeded by Bert T. Kobayashi |
