= Masaji Marumoto =

American judge (1906–1995)

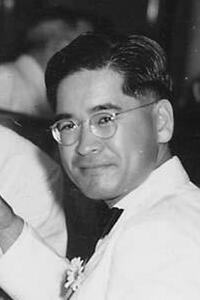

Associate Justice of the Hawaii Territorial Supreme Court
- In office 1956 – September 15, 1960
- Appointed by: Dwight D. Eisenhower
- Preceded by: Philip L. Rice
- Succeeded by: Jack Mizuha

Associate Justice of the Supreme Court of Hawaii
- In office May 8, 1967 – December 28, 1973
- Appointed by: John A. Burns
- Preceded by: Cable A. Wirtz
- Succeeded by: Benjamin Menor

Personal details
- Born: January 27, 1906 Honolulu, Hawaii, U.S.
- Died: February 10, 1995 (aged 89) Honolulu, Hawaii, U.S.
- Education: University of Chicago (BA); Harvard Law School (LLB)
- Awards: Order of the Sacred Treasure

Military service
- Allegiance: United States
- Branch/service: United States Army
- Years of service: 1941–1947
- Rank: 2nd Lt
- Unit: Military Intelligence Service Language School
- Battles/wars: World War II

Masaji Marumoto (Japanese: 丸本 正二, Hepburn: Marumoto Masaji; January 27, 1906 – February 10, 1995) was the first Japanese American justice of the Supreme Court of Hawaii. He served from 1956 to 1973. He was the first Japanese American to graduate from Harvard Law School, and the first Asian American to serve as president of the Hawaii Bar Association.

== Early life and education ==
Marumoto was born on January 27, 1906, in Honolulu to immigrants from Hiroshima, Japan. He grew up in Kona, and in seventh grade moved back to Honolulu, where he attended McKinley High School and graduated at the top of his class in 1924.

After graduating from high school he earned a bachelor's degree in economics with a minor in philosophy from the University of Chicago. At first Marumoto wanted to major in philosophy, but his father convinced him to major in something more "practical". In 1927 he became the first Asian to enter Harvard Law School. He graduated in 1930.

== Career ==
After graduating from law school Marumoto returned to Hawaii and took the Hawaii Bar Exam. He worked at a few law offices in Honolulu before opening his own practice in 1932. In 1933 he married Shizuko Ozu.

After Pearl Harbor was attacked in 1942, Marumoto helped to start the Emergency Services Committee, which worked with law enforcement and civilians to ease tensions between the Japanese-American community and those who thought they were a threat. He also volunteered to join the 442nd, but failed the physical because of his clubfoot, which he was born with. Instead, he taught at the Military Intelligence Service (MIS) language school since he was fluent in Japanese. In May 1945 he was sent to Okinawa to assist with establishing a government there. He was later sent to Korea, and left the military in 1946, after the war ended. In June 1946 he was elected president of the MIS Veterans Club.

He became president of the Hawaii Bar Association in 1954 and was the first Japanese American to serve in that position. In 1956 he was appointed as an associate justice to the Supreme Court of the Territory of Hawaii by President Eisenhower, and remained in that position when Hawaii became a state in 1959. He quit in 1960 and rejoined private practice, but returned to the Supreme Court from 1967 to 1973. He resigned from the court in December 1973 to enable Governor John A. Burns to appoint his successor, with Burns appointing Benjamin Menor to the seat.

Marumoto wrote extensively on the history of Japanese in Hawaii, and received an honorary doctorate for his work from the University of Hawaii at Manoa in 1985. He also received a Second Class Order of the Sacred Treasure from Emperor Hirohito.

Marumoto died on February 10, 1995.

== Personal life ==
Marumoto was married to Shigeko Marumoto. They had two children, Wendell Marumoto (who married Hawaii state representative Barbara Marumoto) and Claire Marumoto.

== See also ==
- John Aiso - first Japanese American judge in the continental U.S. (1957)
- Herbert Choy - first Asian American U.S. federal judge (1971)
- Benjamin Menor - first Filipino American state justice (1959)
- Kathryn Doi Todd - first female Asian American judge in the U.S. (1978)
- Cyrus Nils Tavares - first Native Hawaiian U.S. federal judge (1960)
- Wilfred Tsukiyama - first Asian American state chief justice (1959)
- Delbert E. Wong - first Chinese American judge in the continental U.S. (1959)

Political offices
Preceded by Philip L. Rice	Territorial Supreme Court; 1956–1960	Succeeded by Jack Mizuha
Preceded by Cable A. Wirtz	Justice of the Supreme Court of Hawaii; 1967–1973	Succeeded by Benjamin Menor
