= William Austin Whiting =

American judge (1855–1908)

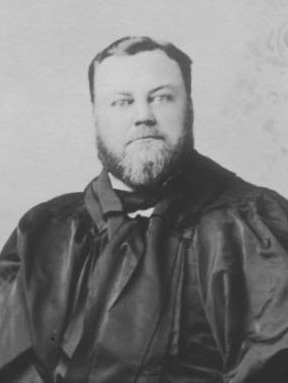

Second Associate Justice of the Supreme Court of the Republic of Hawaii
- In office January 11, 1896 – July 14, 1900
- Monarch: Liliʻuokalani
- Preceded by: Richard F. Bickerton
- Succeeded by: organization of the Territory of Hawaii

Kingdom of Hawaii Attorney General
- In office February 25, 1891 – July 27, 1892
- Monarch: Liliʻuokalani
- Preceded by: Arthur P. Peterson
- Succeeded by: Paul Neumann

Personal details
- Born: August 5, 1855 Charlestown, Massachusetts, U.S.
- Died: January 18, 1908 (aged 52) Honolulu County, Territory of Hawaii
- Relations: James W. Austin (uncle)
- Education: Harvard College

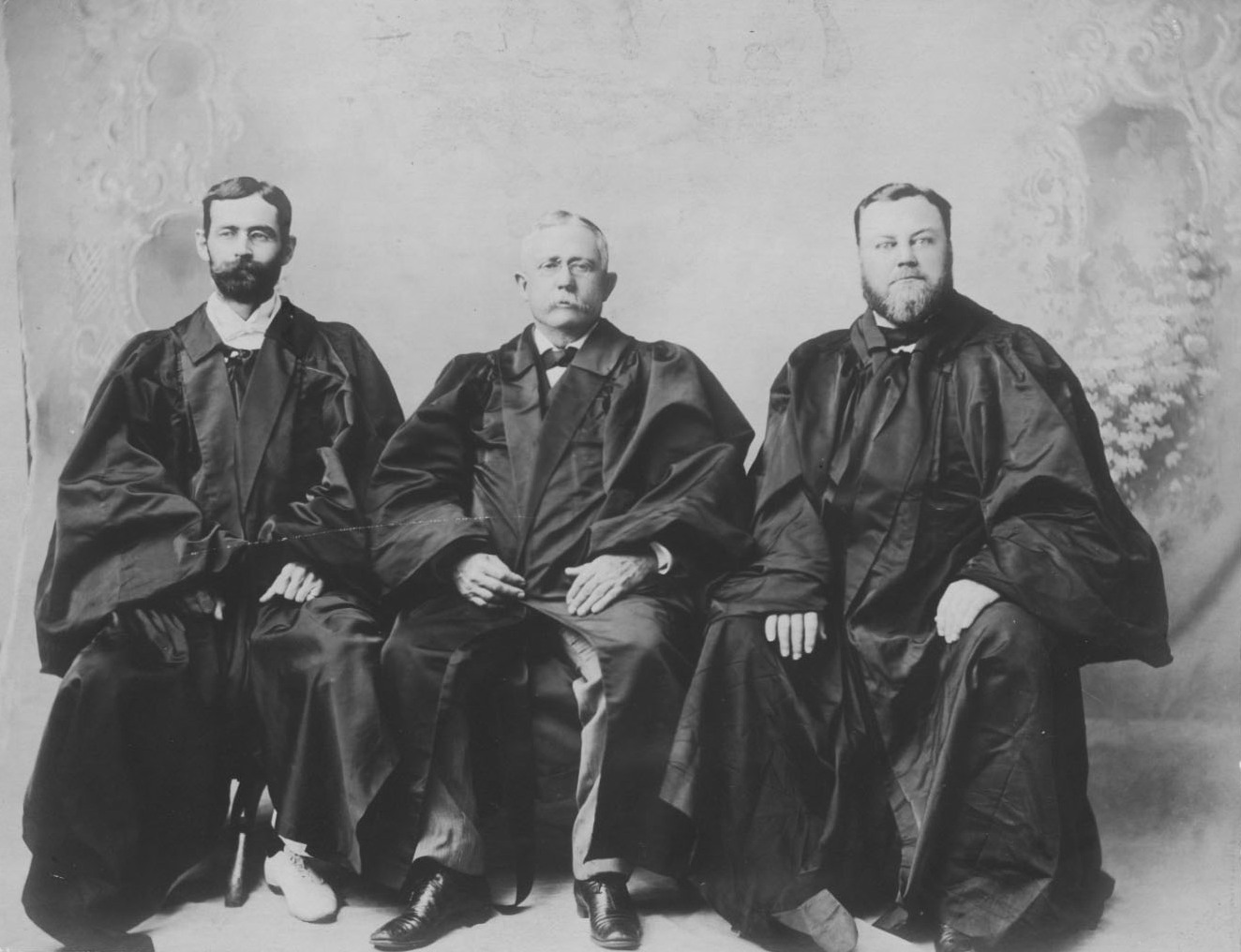
William Austin Whiting (right) as Second Associate Justice of the Hawaii Supreme Court with Chief Justice Albert Francis Judd and First Associate Justice Walter F. Frear

William Austin Whiting (August 5, 1855 – January 18, 1908) was an American lawyer and politician of the Kingdom, Republic, and Territory of Hawaii. He served as Attorney General of Hawaii and was an associate justice of the Supreme Court of Hawaii. During his college years, he was captain of the 1875 Harvard Crimson football team.

== Life and career ==
Whiting was born August 5, 1855, in Charlestown, Massachusetts. His ancestors included Massachusetts colonial governors Thomas Dudley and Simon Bradstreet, and Reverend John Cotton. He became a sixth generation Harvard College graduate, and served as captain of the 1875 Harvard Crimson football team. After graduating Harvard, he became a lawyer and practiced in Boston and Charlestown.

Whiting resettled in the Hawaiian Islands in 1880 where his uncle James W. Austin was an associate justice of the Supreme Court of the Kingdom of Hawaii. He continued his law practice in Honolulu. In 1891, the newly enthroned Queen Liliuokalani appointed him as Attorney General succeeding Arthur P. Peterson of the hold-over cabinet from the reign of King Kalākaua. As a cabinet minister, he sat as a member of the House of Nobles, the upper body of the legislature of the kingdom. Considered a tool of the queen by her opposition, Whiting lost popularity for his defense of the controversial Marshal Charles Burnett Wilson, a favorite of the queen and subordinate of the Attorney General. Whiting resigned on July 27, 1892, and was replaced by Paul Neumann.

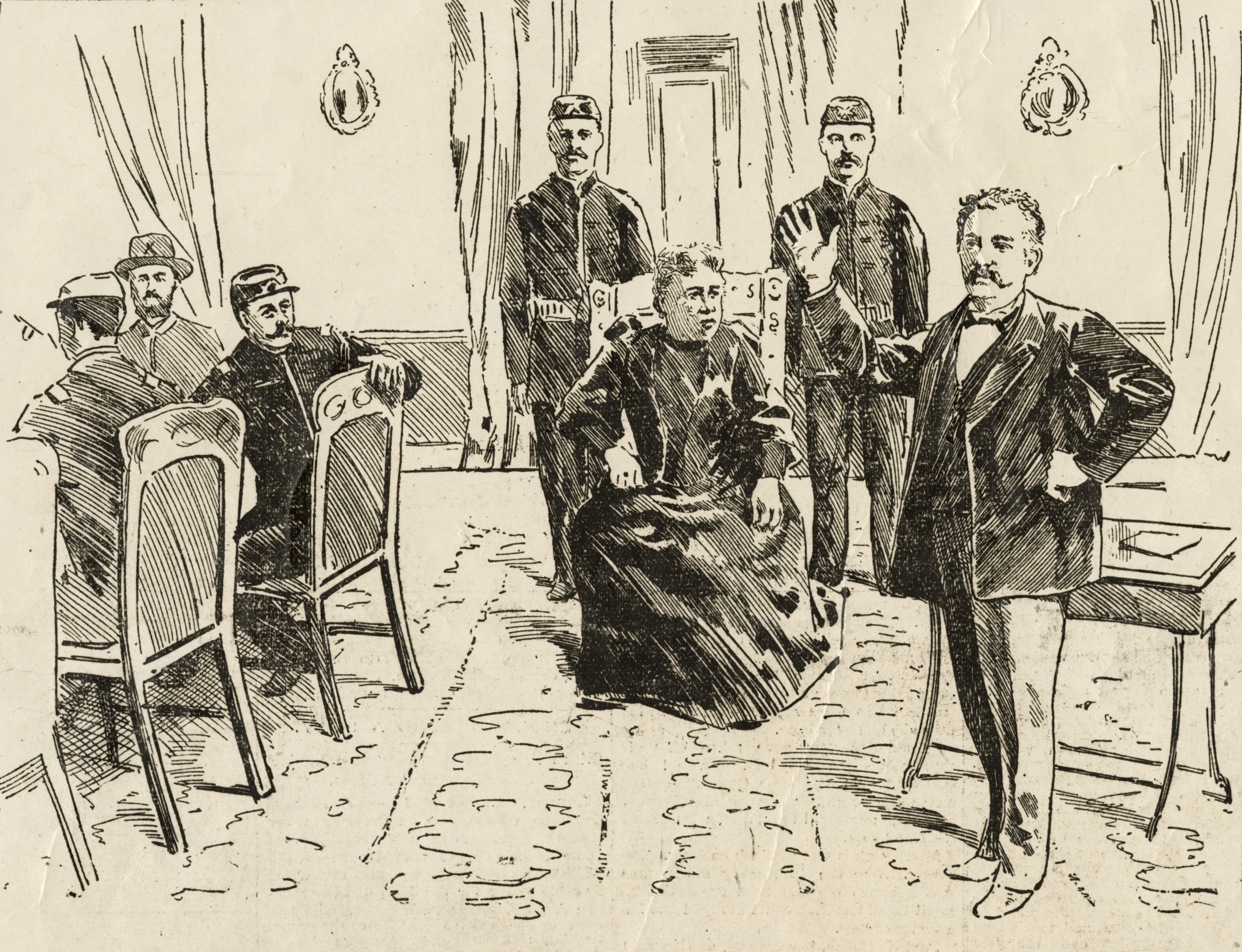
Trial of Queen Liliuokalani

On January 11, 1893, he was appointed First Judge of the First Circuit Court. Six days later, the monarchy was overthrown by pro-American elements in Hawaii. Whiting continued his position under the successive new regimes. Following the unsuccessful Royalist counter-revolution, Whiting headed the military tribunal which sentenced Liliuokalani for misprision of treason. In this capacity, he was given the rank of Colonel by the Republic of Hawaii. The trial was held in the former throne room of the ʻIolani Palace. The deposed queen was defended by Paul Neumann. She claimed ignorance but was sentenced to five years of hard labor in prison by the military tribunal and fined $5,000. The sentence was commuted on September 4, 1895 to imprisonment in an upstairs bedroom of ʻIolani Palace.

Whiting continued working as a circuit court judge until his elevation to the Supreme Court. On January 11, 1896, he was appointed Second Associate Justice of the Supreme Court of the Republic of Hawaii succeeding the vacant seat left by the death of Richard Frederick Bickerton. He held this position until the annexation of Hawaii and the organization of the Territory of Hawaii on July 14, 1900. After retiring from politics, he returned to his private law practice. Judge Whiting died on January 18, 1908; the cause of death was "dropsy caused by cirrhosis of the liver".

== Personal life ==
Whiting had three children out of wedlock by an unnamed woman. The three children are Elizabeth Maunakapu Whiting (born 1885), Ethel Hakula Whiting (born 1887), and Austin Whiting (born 1889). In the 1900 US Census, the children lived in John & Lizzie Mana's household as boarders.

== Bibliography ==
- Allen, Helena G. (1982). The Betrayal of Liliuokalani: Last Queen of Hawaii, 1838–1917. Glendale, CA: A. H. Clark Company. ISBN 978-0-87062-144-4. OCLC 9576325.
- DuPuis, Reshela Patrik (1997). Documenting Community: Activist Videography in Hawai'i. Ann Arbor: University of Michigan. ISBN 978-0-591-30764-1. OCLC 317898743.
- Kuykendall, Ralph Simpson (1967). The Hawaiian Kingdom 1874–1893, The Kalakaua Dynasty. Vol. 3. Honolulu: University of Hawaii Press. ISBN 978-0-87022-433-1. OCLC 500374815.
- Thayer, William Roscoe; Castle, William Richards; Howe, Mark Antony De Wolfe; Pier, Arthur Stanwood; De Voto, Bernard Augustine; Morrison, Theodore (1909). The Harvard Graduates' Magazine. Vol. 17. Boston: Harvard Graduates' Magazine Association. p. 198. OCLC 1644049.
