= Homer Baird Kidwell =

American judge

Associate Justice of the Supreme Court of Hawaii
- In office 1975–1979
- Succeeded by: Edward H. Nakamura

Deputy Attorney General of the Territory of Hawaii
- Nominated by: J. Garner Anthony

Personal details
- Born: October 20, 1911 Maricopa, California, U.S.
- Died: December 27, 2000 (aged 89) Medford, Oregon
- Spouse: Margaret Greenwell
- Children: Alan Baird Kidwell; Frances Findley
- Education: Taft College; Stanford University

Homer Baird Kidwell (October 20, 1911 – December 27, 2000) was an American lawyer. He worked as a corporate attorney in Los Angeles and Honolulu. From July 1, 1975 to February 28, 1979 he served as a justice of the Supreme Court of Hawaii.

== Career ==
Kidwell graduated from Taft College in 1930 and Stanford University in 1935. He worked in Los Angeles for a couple of years before moving to Hawaii in 1937. During the Second World War he served as deputy attorney general of the Territory of Hawaii. From 1975 to 1979 he was an associate justice of the Supreme Court of Hawaii. In 1979, he retired to teach law at the University of Hawaii.

== Personal life ==
Kidwell married Margaret Greenwell on January 4, 1940. The couple had a son, Alan, and a daughter, Frances.
