= Bernard H. Levinson =

American jurist in Hawaii (1907–1990)

Associate Justice of the Supreme Court of Hawaii
- In office 1967–1974
- Governor: John A. Burns

Judge of the First Circuit Court of Hawaii
- In office 1966–1967

Personal details
- Born: September 12, 1907 Cincinnati, Ohio, U.S.
- Died: October 24, 1990 (aged 83) Honolulu, Hawaii, U.S.
- Education: University of Cincinnati (B.A.); Harvard Law School (LL.B.)
- Profession: Jurist, lawyer

Bernard H. Levinson (September 12, 1907 – October 24, 1990) was an American lawyer and jurist who served as an Associate Justice of the Supreme Court of Hawaii from 1967 to 1974.

== Early life and education ==
Levinson was born in Cincinnati, Ohio, on September 12, 1907. He attended the University of Cincinnati, earning a Bachelor of Arts (B.A.) degree in 1929. He then enrolled at Harvard Law School, graduating with a Bachelor of Laws (LL.B.) in 1932.

== Legal and judicial career ==
Following his admission to the bar, Levinson practiced law and held federal government legal positions in Washington, D.C., and Seattle during the New Deal and World War II eras before settling in Honolulu, Hawaii, in the late 1940s. In Honolulu, he built a prominent private practice in civil and commercial litigation.

In 1966, Governor John A. Burns appointed Levinson to the First Circuit Court of Hawaii. The following year, Burns elevated him to the Supreme Court of Hawaii as an Associate Justice. Serving alongside Chief Justice William S. Richardson, Levinson participated in landmark post-statehood decisions addressing property rights, public access to Hawaii's beaches, and native Hawaiian customary law. He retired from the court in 1974.

== Personal life and death ==
Levinson's nephew, Steven Levinson, moved to Honolulu in 1971 to serve as his law clerk and later served as an Associate Justice of the Supreme Court of Hawaii from 1992 to 2008. Bernard Levinson died in Honolulu on October 24, 1990, at the age of 83.
