= William S. Edings =

American judge (1857–1927)

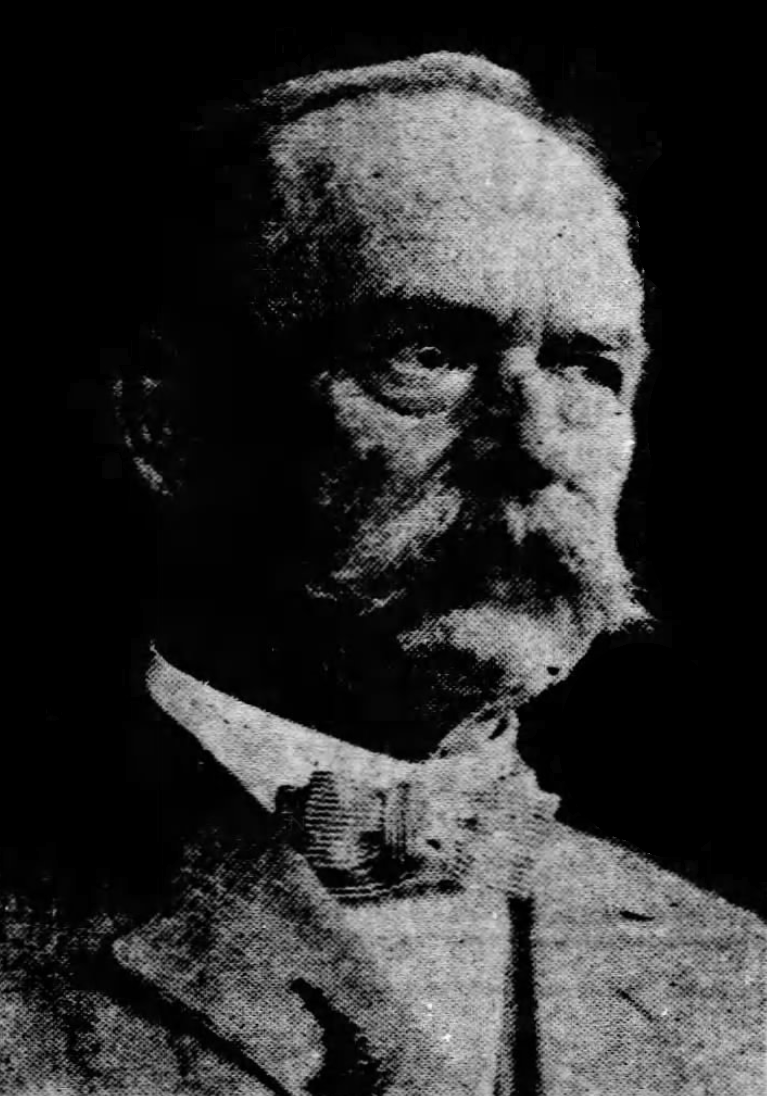
- Judge William S. Edings in 1918

Justice of the Territorial Supreme Court of Hawaii
- In office September 26, 1918 – October 10, 1922
- Appointed by: Woodrow Wilson

Personal details
- Born: 1857 Charleston, South Carolina
- Died: August 23, 1927 (aged 69–70) Ocala, Florida
- Party: Democrat

William Seabrook Edings (1857 – August 23, 1927) was a justice of the Territorial Supreme Court of Hawaii from September 26, 1918 to October 10, 1922.

Born in Charleston, South Carolina, Edings eventually moved to the state of Washington, and in 1895 moved to Hawaii. In 1900, he was appointed as a judge of the territorial circuit court at Kailua, Hawaii, where he remained for four years. During his tenure there, he compiled a digest of Hawaiian reports that came to be used as an authority by Hawaii attorneys. Edings was nominated to the territorial court by President Woodrow Wilson on September 6, 1918, with the nomination generally being met with bipartisan approval. At the same time that Wilson named Edings, a Democrat, to the supreme court, he also named former circuit judge John T. DeBolt, a Republican, to succeed Edings as circuit judge.

Edings died in Ocala, Florida, around the age of 70.

Political offices
Preceded by Ralph P. Quarles	Justice of the Supreme Court of Hawaii; 1918–1922	Succeeded by Alexander Lindsay Jr.
