= Alexander Lindsay Jr. =

American judge (1871–1926)

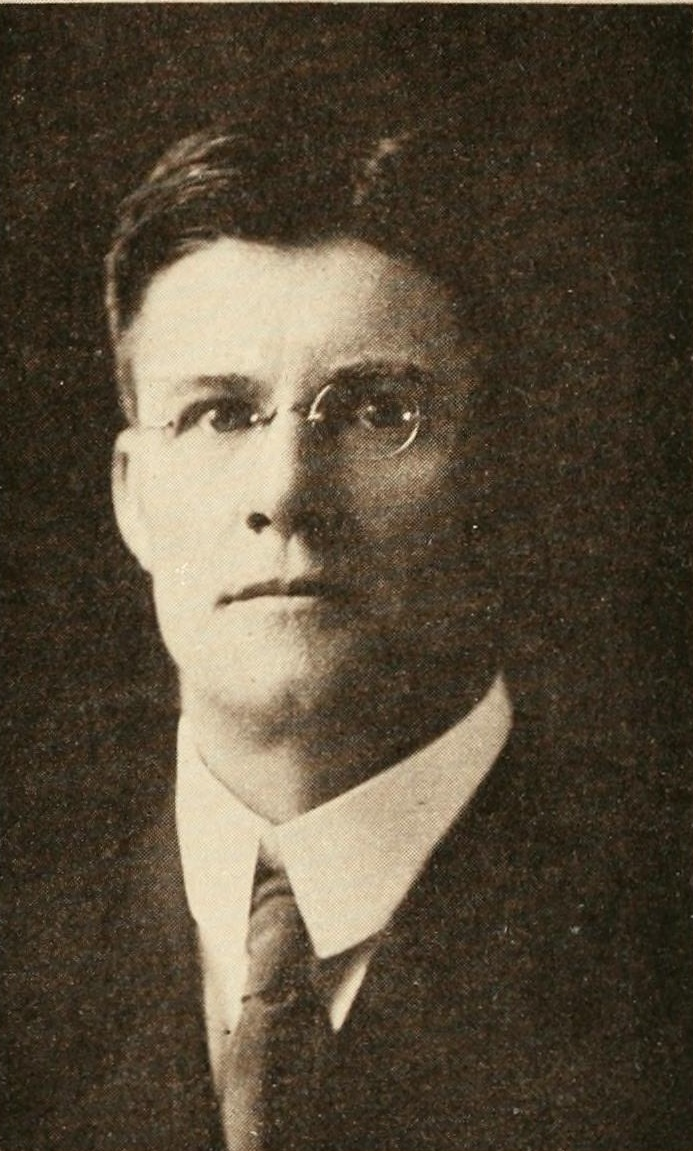

Alexander Lindsay Jr. (October 29, 1871 – September 5, 1926) was a justice of the Territorial Supreme Court of Hawaii from October 10, 1922 until his death on September 5, 1926.

Born in Fifeshire, Scotland, Lindsay's family arrived in Hawaii to settle in Kauai on his tenth birthday. Lindsay attended the public schools of Kauai until 1887, when he moved to Honolulu, where he worked as an interpreter in a law office. Lindsay was a storekeeper from 1889 to 1899, when he moved to Michigan to further his education. He received an LL.B. from the University of Michigan in 1902, and in 1903 Hawaii Governor Sanford B. Dole appointed Lindsay to the office of district magistrate of Honolulu. In 1905, President Theodore Roosevelt appointed Lindsay to a seat on the first judicial circuit of Honolulu, to which Lindsay was reappointed in 1909. He resigned to enter private practice, but in 1910 was appointed Attorney General of Hawaii, remaining in that office until 1913. In 1922, he was appointed by Governor Walter F. Frear to the Territorial Supreme Court of Hawaii, for a term set to expire later in 1926, but he died suddenly while travelling in Sydney, Australia.

Lindsay married Fanny Louise Young of Vicksburg, Michigan, in 1906. They had a son and a daughter.

Political offices
Preceded by William S. Edings	Justice of the Supreme Court of Hawaii; 1922–1926	Succeeded by Charles F. Parsons
