= Edward Nakamura =

American judge (1922–1997)

Edward Hideki Nakamura (Japanese: 中村 秀樹, October 9, 1922 – September 12, 1997) was a longtime labor lawyer and judge. He served as a justice of the Supreme Court of Hawaii from March 24, 1980, to December 28, 1989.

== Biography ==
Nakamura was born on October 9, 1922, in Honolulu to Ijuro and Shige Nakamura and had an older brother, Henry. He graduated from McKinley High School in Honolulu, studied at the University of Hawaii, and was a member of the ROTC there. When Pearl Harbor was attacked in 1941 he became a member of the Hawaii Territorial Guard, then the Varsity Victory Volunteers and volunteered for the U.S. Army’s famed 442nd Regimental Combat team. He fought in Europe as a member of the artillery. After the war he used his GI Bill benefits to enroll at the University of Chicago Law School. He graduated in 1951. Nakamura then joined Bouslog & Symonds, a labor law firm in Hawaii. He is best known for working with the firm’s most important client, the ILWU, during the McCarthy era, which put him under suspicion for being a potential communist. Nakamura once remarked after hearing strange noises on the telephone line that the telephone wiretap must not have been working well that day. He was instrumental in lobbying the State Legislature on behalf of the ILWU for many years to enact legislation such as temporary disability insurance that protected the interests of working people.

Nakamura also served as a regent at the University of Hawaii during the Vietnam War, a time of great unrest at the University.

Nakamura was selected for the Supreme Court of Hawaii in 1980. He retired in 1989 capping a career of criticizing abuses of power and helping improve the lives of working people. Even in retirement, Nakamura continued to speak out about what he regarded as corruption and cronyism in local politics including at the Hawaii State Pension system and at the Bishop Estate, a huge charity whose trustees were appointed by the Hawaii Supreme Court.

Nakamura died during open heart surgery in Honolulu on September 12, 1997, and was survived by his wife Martha who herself died in March 2020. They had no children.

Political offices
Preceded by	Justice of the Supreme Court of Hawaii; 1980–1989	Succeeded by
