= Ululani McQuaid =

American opera singer

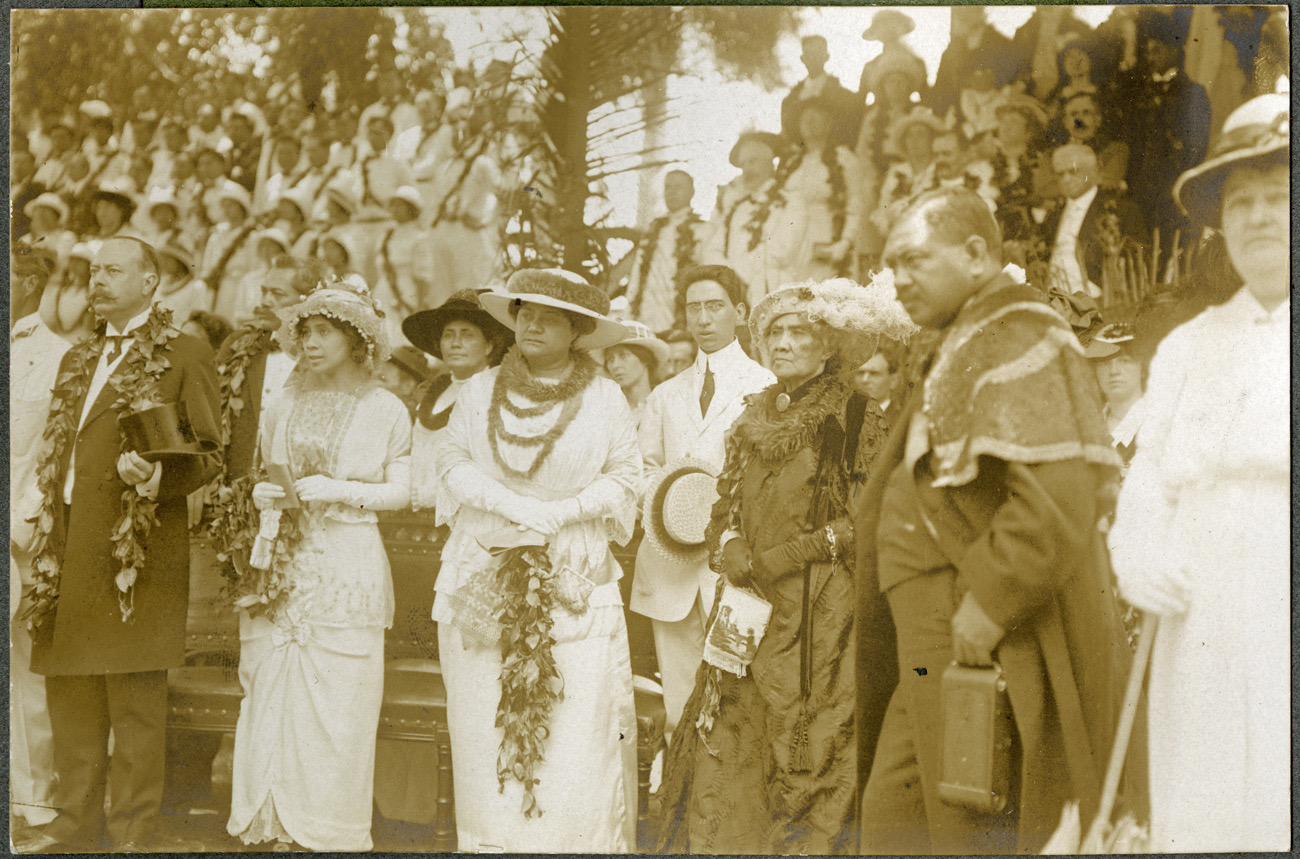
Ululani and her husband A. G. M. Robertson (in the foreground, left) attending the 1914 Kamehameha Day celebration with Prince Jonah Kūhiō Kalanianaʻole and Queen Liliʻuokalani

Ululani Papaikaniau McQuaid Robertson (later Jabulka) (1890–1970) was a Hawaiian opera singer and civic leader.

== Biography ==
McQuaid was born to family with large landholdings in Kupanihi Valley on Oahu island, and with royal ancestry on her mother's side. Her father was an Englishman, James H. McQuaid.

McQuaid's soprano voice became recognised as notable, and she began to take singing lessons from Elizabeth Mackell in Honolulu and performed in local recitals and plays. In the 1920s Mackell moved to California to teach singing at Mills College, and McQuaid went with her; her goal, she said, was to develop her voice as an accomplishment. She later moved on to study with Marcella Sembrich in New York. McQuaid returned to Honolulu regularly, and performed there in 1922 and 1924.

In around 1925 McQuaid went to Europe to study voice further, taking lessons in Italy with Giuseppe Benvenuto and Pietro Mascagni. She performed in operas such as Puccini's La bohème and Madama Butterfly in Milan, Paris and other European cities. In Paris she debuted under the stage name Madame la Princesse Ululani and continued to perform under this name for several seasons, returning to Hawaii in 1933.

Following her retirement from singing, McQuaid served the community of Honolulu on the City and County Board of Public Parks and Recreation, and was a member of the Hawaiian Civic Club, the Garden Club and the Outdoor Circle.

=== Personal life ===
In 1907, McQuaid married Alexander G. M. Robertson, a politician who later became Chief Justice of the Supreme Court of Hawaii. McQuaid was still a teenager at the time of her marriage, and Robertson was more than twice her age. In 1959, after Robertson's death, she married Jan Jabulka, a newspaper executive, and they lived in Washington D.C. for a number of years.
