= Albert Moses Cristy =

American jurist in Hawaii (1889–1949)

Associate Justice of the Supreme Court of Hawaii
- In office March 1949 – July 11, 1949
- President: Harry S. Truman

Judge of the First Circuit Court of the Territory of Hawaii
- In office 1927–1949

Personal details
- Born: February 13, 1889 Hudson, Ohio, U.S.
- Died: July 11, 1949 (aged 60) Honolulu, Territory of Hawaii, U.S.
- Education: Brown University (A.B.); Harvard Law School (LL.B.)
- Profession: Jurist, lawyer, educator

Albert Moses Cristy (February 13, 1889 – July 11, 1949) was an American lawyer and jurist who served for over two decades on the territorial bench in Hawaii, culminating in his service as an Associate Justice of the Supreme Court of Hawaii in 1949.

== Early life and education ==
Cristy was born on February 13, 1889, in Hudson, Ohio, to Reverend Albert Barnes Cristy and Mary Wilhelmina (Linsley) Cristy. He attended Brown University, where he sang in the glee club and competed on the swimming team, graduating with a Bachelor of Arts (A.B.) degree in 1909. Following college, he taught mathematics and mechanical drawing at Williston Seminary in Easthampton, Massachusetts, from 1909 to 1911.

Cristy subsequently enrolled at Harvard Law School, where he served as an associate editor of the Harvard Law Review during the 1913–1914 academic year and graduated with a Bachelor of Laws (LL.B.) cum laude in 1914.

== Legal and judicial career ==
After graduating from law school in 1914, Cristy relocated to Honolulu, where he began practicing law with the firm of Frear, Prosser, Anderson & Marx. In 1915, he entered public service as the first deputy city and county attorney for Honolulu.

In 1927, Cristy was appointed a judge of the First Circuit Court of the Territory of Hawaii, a position he held for twenty-two years. In March 1949, President Harry S. Truman appointed him as an Associate Justice of the Supreme Court of the Territory of Hawaii. His tenure on the territorial high court was cut short by his death four months later.
