= James W. Austin =

American judge (1829–1895)

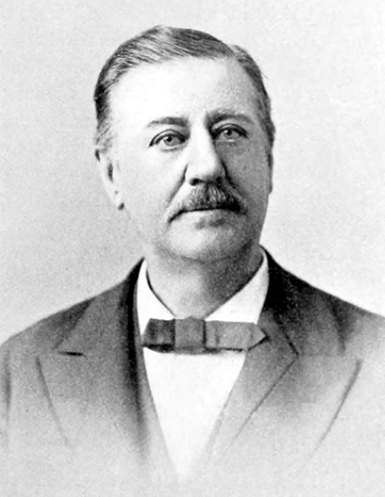

Justice of the Supreme Court of the Kingdom of Hawaii
- In office July 10, 1868 – July 10, 1869

Personal details
- Born: James Walker Austin; January 8, 1829 Boston, Massachusetts, United States
- Died: October 15, 1895 (aged 66) Southampton, England
- Spouse: Ariana E. Sleeper (m. 1857)
- Education: Harvard Law School
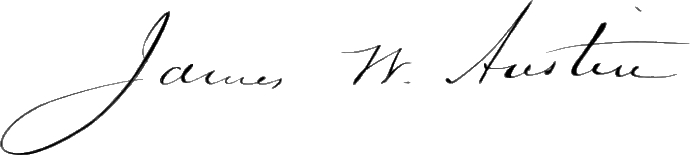
- Signature

James Walker Austin (January 8, 1829 – October 15, 1895) was a justice of the Supreme Court of the Kingdom of Hawaii from July 10, 1868, to July 10, 1869.

== Biography ==
Austin was the son of author and lawyer William Austin. He was born in Charlestown, Boston and graduated from Harvard College in 1849 and from Harvard Law School in 1851. He moved to Hawaii in 1852 and located in Lahaina, Maui, where he remained until 1857. He married Ariana E. Sleeper on July 18 of that year.

After leaving Lahaina he visited his old home in Massachusetts and returned to the islands with his wife, settling in Honolulu. He was a member of the Hawaiian parliament for three sessions, and was speaker of the house for one session. He was appointed judge of the supreme court of the Islands. Austin was one of the most prominent lawyers of the Kingdom. He did a large trust business, and many of the title deeds were made in his handwriting.

Austin's two sons, Henry and Walter, were born in Hawaii. Austin and his wife resided in Honolulu until 1872, when they returned to Boston. Although he never visited Hawaii after his departure in 1872, Austin held large property interests, particularly in the business portion of Honolulu.

Austin left the States for a European tour on account of failing health. He died suddenly while visiting Southampton, England, at the age of 66. It was "supposed that his sudden demise was due to heart failure".

Political offices
Preceded by Robert Grimes Davis	Justice of the Supreme Court of the Kingdom of Hawaii; 1868–1869	Succeeded by Hermann A. Widemann
