= Rhoda Valentine Lewis =

American judge (1906–1991)

Justice of the Supreme Court of Hawaii
- In office October 5, 1959 – May 8, 1967

Judge of the Hawaii Family Court

Personal details
- Born: August 13, 1906 Chicago
- Died: September 12, 1991 (aged 85)
- Education: Stanford University (BA, JD)

Rhoda Valentine Lewis (August 31, 1906 – September 12, 1991) was the first female justice on the Supreme Court of Hawaii.

== Early life ==
Lewis was born in Chicago on August 31, 1906, to parents Charles Tobias and Josephine Lewis. She moved to Honolulu and attended the Punahou School; then moved to Manila, and attended the American-European School; and graduated from the Frances Willard Jr. High School in Berkeley, California. She graduated from Stanford University in 1927, and received her Juris Doctor from Stanford Law School in 1929, graduating first in her class, and becoming a member of the Order of the Coif.

== Career ==
Lewis worked for a former Stanford Professor, before working for a law firm in Buffalo, New York. In 1937 she moved back to Hawaii, where she worked for the Honolulu Prosecutor's Office and then the Attorney General's Office. Lewis worked in the Attorney General's Office from 1940 to 1958, writing numerous opinions and memorandums. After the Attack on Pearl Harbor in 1941 she drafted the Hawaii Defense Act, granting the governor emergency powers. She was later involved in Duncan v. Kahanamoku, a case argued before the Supreme Court of the United States over martial law in Hawaii. Lewis helped revise Hawaiian laws by serving on a 1944 commission.

The Governor of Hawaii, William Quinn appointed Lewis to the Supreme Court of Hawaii in 1959. Lewis wrote forty three opinions, eight joint opinions, eight concurring opinions, and nine dissents while on the bench. A 1961 opinion she wrote for the court gave the family of a deceased person the right to gain some of their "projected life earnings" if it was discovered someone "negligently contributed" to their death. Lewis provided legal consultation the effort to gain Hawaii statehood, advocating on the issue in Washington, D.C. several times. Lewis left the court in 1967 and the following year was on the Hawaii Constitutional Convention of 1968. From 1971 to 1972 she worked as a reporter for the Committee on the Coordination of Rules and Statutes.

== Personal life ==
Lewis died on September 12, 1991.

Political offices
Preceded by Newly constituted court.	Justice of the Supreme Court of Hawaii; 1959–1967	Succeeded by
