= Hermann A. Widemann =

German-born American businessman, judge and politician (1822–1899)

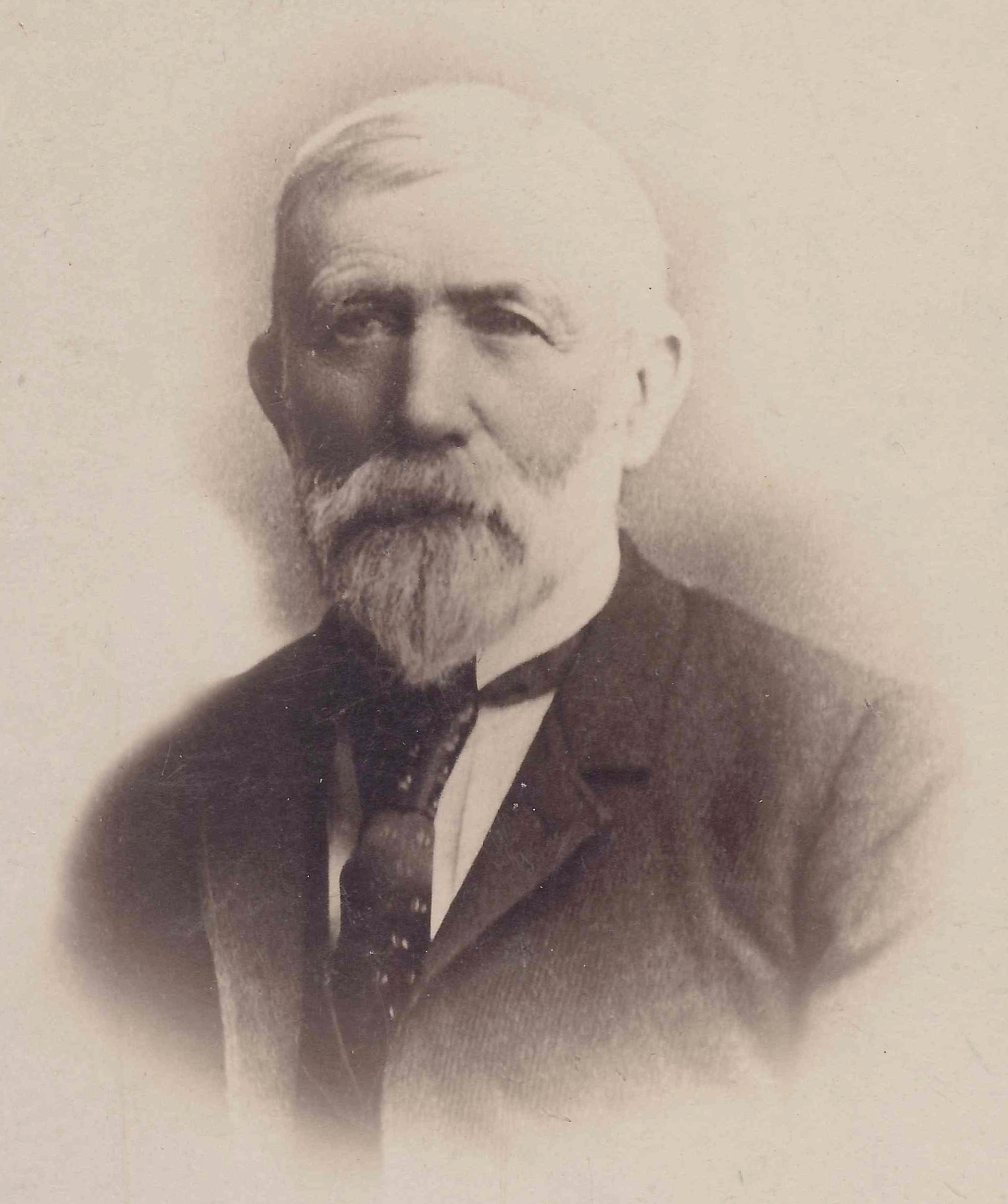
- Widemann, c. 1880–1890s
- Born: December 24, 1822; Hanover, Germany
- Died: February 7, 1899 (aged 76); Honolulu, Hawaii, US
- Occupation(s): Judge, Businessman, Politician
- Spouse: Mary Kaumana Pilahiuilani
- Children: 13

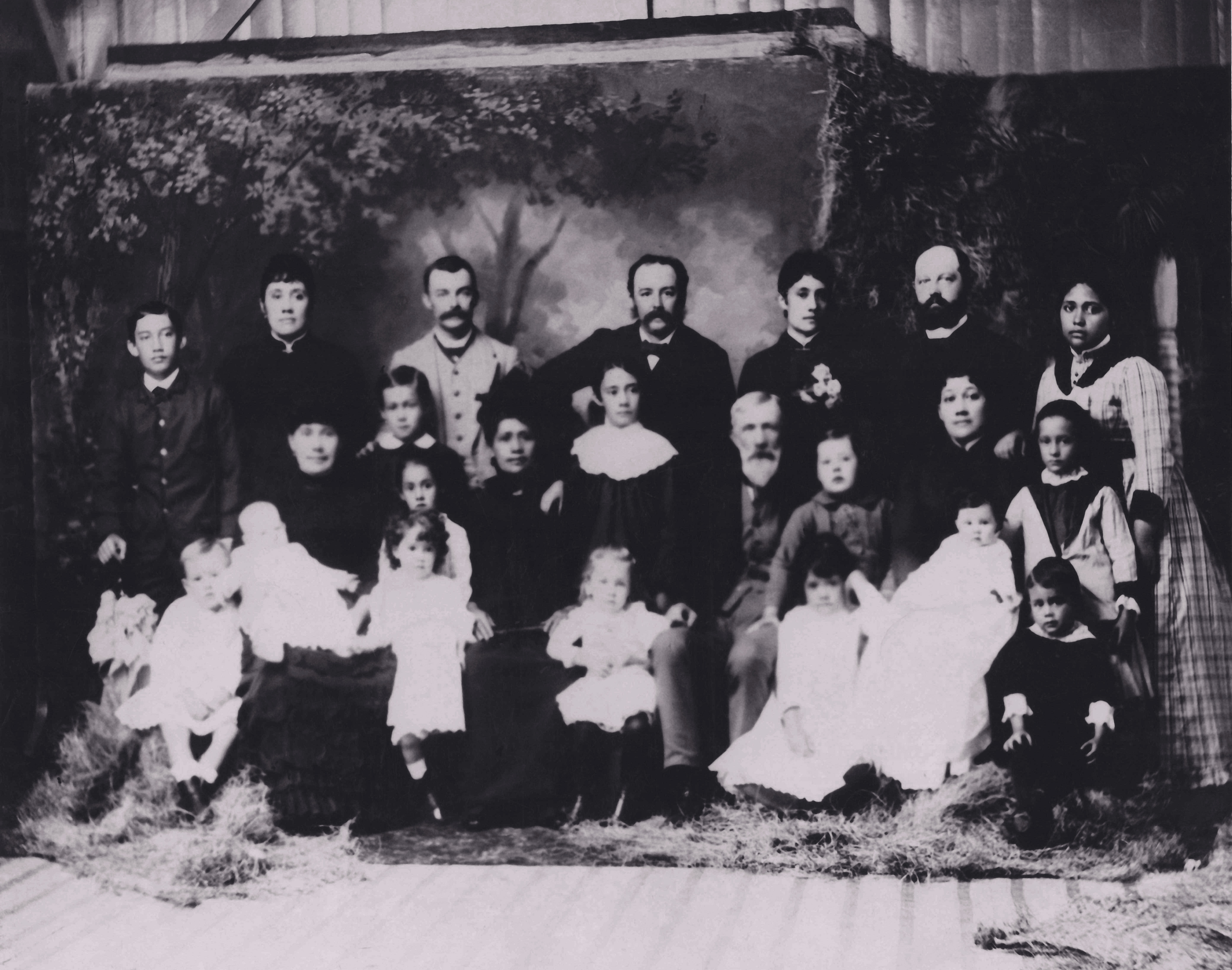
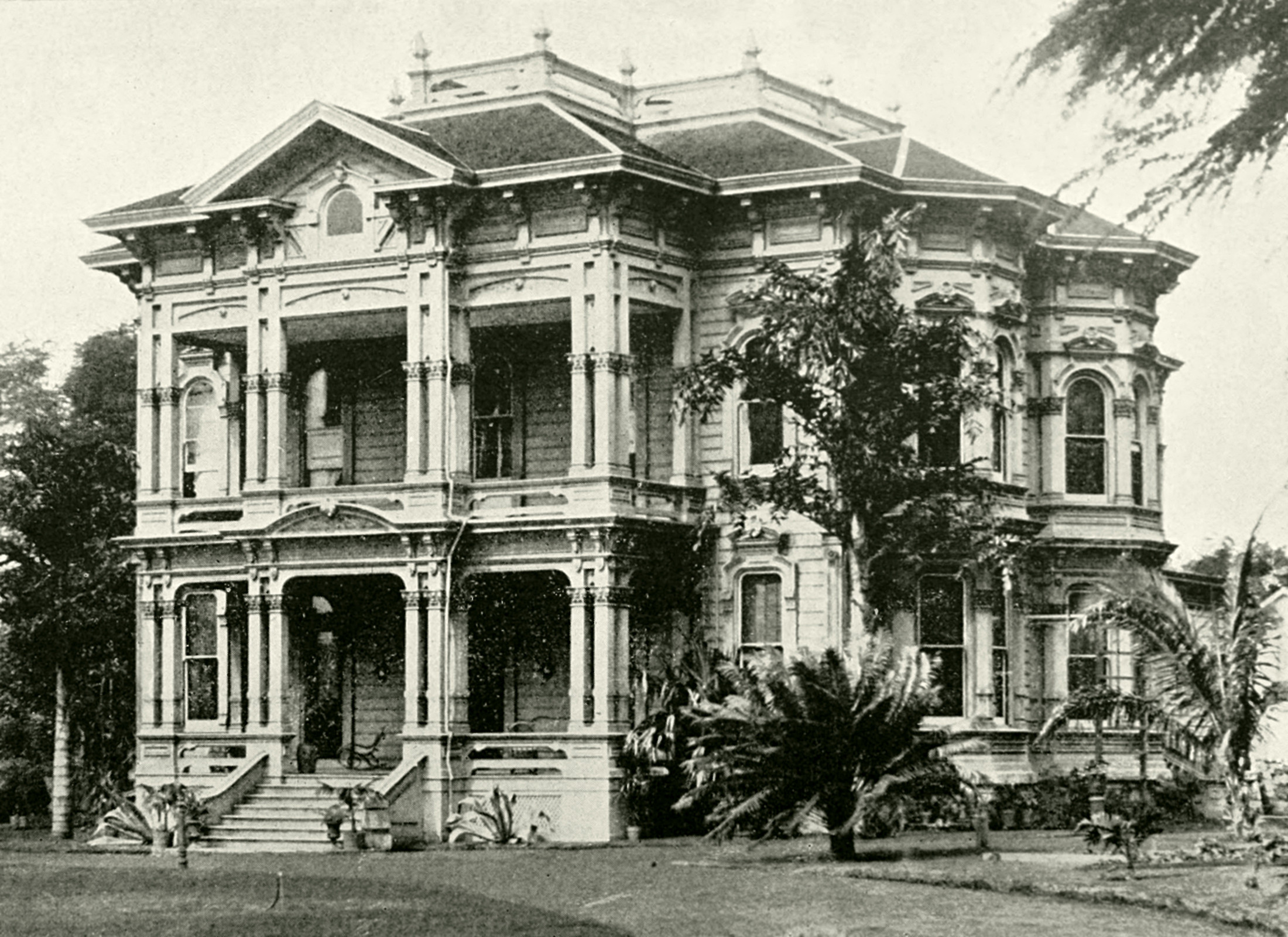
Photograph of Widemann and family, 1886 (left), and the Widemanns' Residence, Honolulu, 1900 (right).

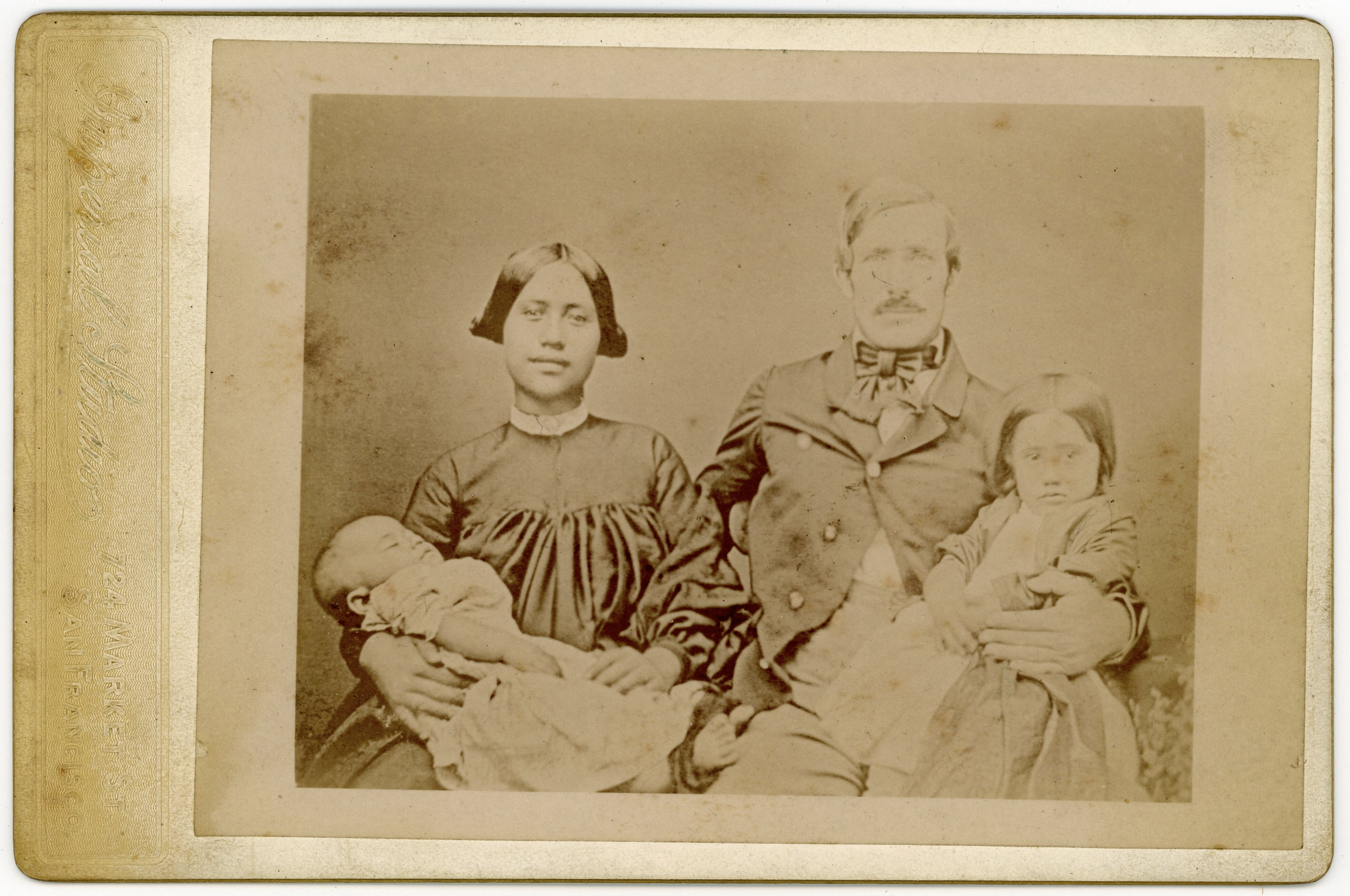
Mary Kaumana Kealaimoku Widemann and her husband, H.A. Widemann. Kaumana is holding their daughter, Emma Kalanikaulelei'aiwinui a mamao Widemann & H.A. is holding their daughter, Martha Pilahiu'ilani Hakaukalalapuakea Kiha a Ki'ilani Widemann Berger.

Hermann Adam Widemann (December 24, 1822 – February 7, 1899) was a German-born American businessman, judge and politician.

== Life ==
Widemann was born in Hanover, Germany on December 24, 1822. As a teenager, he went to work on a whaling ship. He came to live in the Hawaiian Islands in 1846, after stopping in 1843. He came briefly to the California Gold Rush in 1849, but returned after his companion John von Pfister was murdered. He married a native Hawaiian Kaumana "Mary" Kealaimoku in 1854 and lived in Līhuʻe. He became sheriff of the island of Kauaʻi in 1854, was elected to the house of representatives in the legislature of the Hawaiian Kingdom in 1855, and in 1863 appointed its circuit judge. He started one of the first sugarcane plantations in Hawaii known as Grove Farm. During the American Civil War he supported the Confederate States.

After leasing Grove Farm to its manager George Norton Wilcox in 1865, he moved to Honolulu to work in the capital. On July 10, 1869, he was appointed to the kingdom's supreme court, despite never having any formal law school training. On February 18, 1874, he was appointed to the cabinet as minister of the interior until May 28, 1874, as well as on the Privy Council, the board of education, commissioner of crown lands, president of the bureau of immigration, and board of health. In 1878, he started the Waianae Sugar Company in the Waiʻanae district of Oʻahu island.

In 1879, H.A. Widemann (President), S. G. Wilder, (Vice President), and C. O. Berger founded the first telephone company in the Hawaiian Islands. It was incorporated under the name of "The Hawaiian Bell Telephone Co." and on December 30, 1880, began providing service to the City of Honolulu. It Started with thirty instruments in operation and would quickly grow.

Widemann and Berger would leave The Hawaiian Bell Telephone Co. to found The Mutual Telephone Co. in May 1883. A charter was granted in August of the same year. A new plant was built and in March 1885 operation began with 100 subscribers. The installation of The Mutual Telephone Co.'s plant made Honolulu one of the first, if not the first, city in the world to have a dual telephone system.

The fight was on for ten years, until August 2, 1894, when the consolidation of the two companies was effected by The Mutual Telephone Co. acquiring the control of The Hawaiian Bell Telephone Co.

On February 25, 1891, he was appointed as Minister of Finance to Queen Liliʻuokalani, but had to resign two weeks later on March 10. He was temporarily replaced by Samuel Parker, and then John Mott-Smith. After Mott-Smith was sent to Washington, D.C., to attempt to negotiate a trade treaty, Parker served again briefly until Widemann resumed his duties as minister of finance. He also filled in briefly as Attorney General from July 27 to August 29, 1892.

After the 1893 overthrow of the Kingdom of Hawaii, Widemann was sent with Parker and John Adams Cummins to Washington in an attempt to get international support for its restoration. He then continued to London and Berlin but was never successful.

Widemann was interviewed by U.S. Commissioner James H. Blount in preparing his Blount Report on May 20, 1893. He was the first to experiment with the Guatemalan variety of coffea tree, which turned out to be well-adapted to higher elevations; it became the most popular variety through modern times.

He died February 7, 1899. After a funeral in the Cathedral of Our Lady of Peace, he was buried in Oahu Cemetery. He was survived by two sons and seven daughters.

His daughter Wilhelmina Widemann organized the first women's suffrage club in the Territory of Hawaii in 1912. His son Carl Widemann married Helen Umiokalani Parker, daughter of Samuel Parker, in July 1899. A street is named for him in Mākaha at 21°28′15″N 158°13′1″W.

== See also ==
- Coffee production in Hawaii

Government offices
Preceded by Edwin Oscar Hall	Kingdom of Hawaii Minister of Interior; February 1874 – May 1874	Succeeded by W. L. Green
Preceded by Godfrey Brown	Kingdom of Hawaii Minister of Finance; February 1891 – March 1891	Succeeded by Samuel Parker
Preceded by Samuel Parker	Kingdom of Hawaii Minister of Finance; January 1892 – September 1892	Succeeded by E. C. MacFarlane
Preceded by William A. Whiting	Kingdom of Hawaii Attorney General; July 1892 – August 1892	Succeeded by Paul Neumann
