= Philip L. Rice =

American judge (1886–1974)

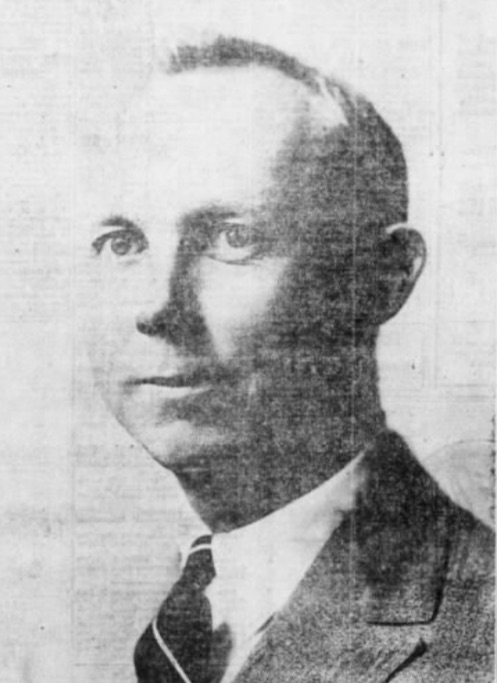
Rice in 1924

Philip LaVergne Rice (July 22, 1886 – January 14, 1974) was a justice of the Territorial Supreme Court of Hawaii from February 7, 1955, to July 27, 1959, serving as the last territorial Chief Justice from March 29, 1956, to July 27, 1959.

Born in Lihue, Kauai, Rice attended Punahou School and graduated from Anderson Academy in Irvington, California, in 1906. After studying business in California, he returned to Kauai and was employed by the Koloa Sugar Co. In 1910, he became clerk of the Fifth Circuit Court on Kauai. He studied law at the University of Chicago, and then entered private practice in Hawaii in 1916. He was an officer in the United States Army in World War I, in the Hawaiian Department, achieving the rank of captain. In 1924, he ran unsuccessfully as a Republican for territorial delegate to Congress.

He participated in establishing the provisional police set-up on Kauai at the outset of World War II. In 1943, he was appointed to a seat on the circuit court for Kauai, also serving as administrator for the Office of Price Administration on Kauai during the war. During a 1946 sugar strike, he issued a restraining order against picketing by the International Longshore and Warehouse Union, which was ultimately upheld by the United States Supreme Court in 1949. On January 14, 1955, President Dwight D. Eisenhower appointed Rice to the Territorial Supreme Court. Eisenhower had declined to nominate Rice's predecessor, Louis LeBaron, a Democrat, prompting criticism from Associate Justice Ingram Stainback. although Rice expressed appreciation of LeBaron's courteous response to the situation. On February 23, 1956, Eisenhower elevated Rice to the position of chief justice.

Rice married Flora Benton in 1911; she died in 1971.

Political offices
Preceded by Louis LeBaron	Justice of the Territorial Supreme Court of Hawaii; 1955–1959	Succeeded by Court abolished
