= Francis March Hatch =

American politician and judge (1852–1923)

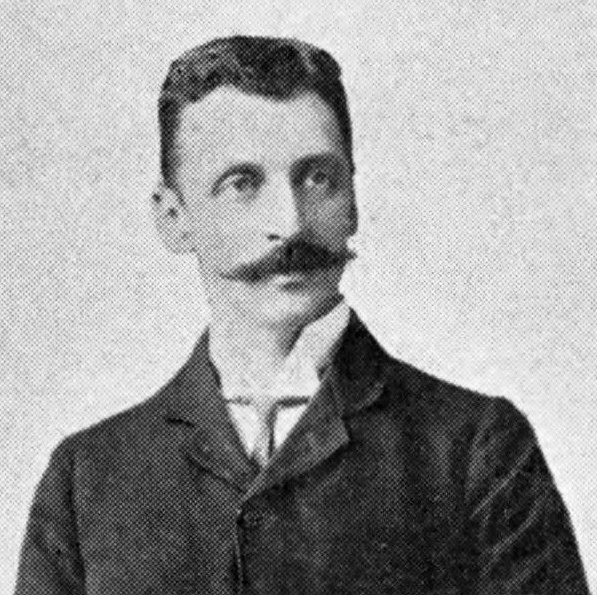

Francis March Hatch (June 7, 1852 – March 19, 1923) was an American lawyer, businessman and politician who served as vice president of the Provisional Government of Hawaii, Minister of the Office of Foreign Affairs and Envoy Extraordinary and Minister Plenipotentiary to the United States for the Republic of Hawaii, and a Hawaiian Supreme Court justice. As the Envoy Extraordinary and Minister Plenipotentiary to the United States, he led the negotiation for the Republic of Hawaii during its annexation.

== Early life ==
Hatch was born in Portsmouth, New Hampshire to Albert Reyter Hatch (1817–1882) and Margaret Rooksby Harris (1817–1891). He graduated from Bowdoin College in 1873 where he was first introduced to missionaries who had returned from Hawaiʻi. He returned to Portsmouth to practice law with his father before journeying west to Hawaiʻi in 1878 to establish a law practice. In 1889, Hatch married Alicia Tate Hawes (1867–1911) in San Francisco, California.

== Vice Presidency of the Provisional Government of Hawaiʻi ==
Once he established his residency in Hawaiʻi, Hatch assimilated into the mercantile class of mostly Americans, but a growing number of Europeans and Chinese were also businesspersons. He became a protege of Sanford B. Dole, the representative to the island of Kauaʻi in the legislature of the Hawaiian Kingdom.

In 1893, the mercantile class became concerned that Queen Liliʻuokalani would try to rescind the 1887 Constitution of the Hawaiian Kingdom, known as the Bayonet Constitution, challenging the share of power between the monarchy and the parliament. When the Queen tried to forcibly recapture power, the business leaders of Hawaiʻi supported the parliamentarians, led by Dole, and forced the Queen into total abdication of her throne. Following the Queen's abdication, a new provisional government was created under the presidency of Dole.

While Hatch was not in Hawaiʻi at the time of the coup d'état, Hatch was appointed Vice President of the Provisional Government in 1893. When the Provisional Government transitioned into the Republic of Hawaii, Hatch was appointed the Minister of the Office of Foreign Affairs by the newly formed Executive Council. As Foreign Minister, Hatch insured the Republic was represented in the world capitals and that every nation, including the United States, recognized the Republic as the legitimate government of the Hawaiian people.

== Annexation Treaty with the United States ==
In 1894, President Dole sent a delegation to Washington, D.C. to negotiate a treaty of annexation with the United States. Ultimately, this annexation attempt failed but following the election of William McKinley in 1896, Dole sent another delegation, this time led by Hatch as the Envoy Extraordinary and Minister Plenipotentiary to the United States. As the leader of the Hawaiian delegation, Hatch led the negotiations for annexation between the Republic of Hawaiʻi and the United States. To obtain support from the U.S. Congress, he focused on the new emergence of Japan as a naval power and the benefits granted from having a strong naval base in the Pacific. He soon gained the support of the U.S. Assistant Secretary of the Navy, Teddy Roosevelt, who said, “If I had it my way: [I] would annex Hawaiʻi tomorrow”.

Hatch soon developed new relationships within Washington and his persistence and refined manner helped annexation gain support within Congress. He arranged a meeting with President McKinley and impressed him with his wit, refinement, and dignified manner. In time, and with the support of Roosevelt, Hatch convinced McKinley of the benefits of annexation. On June 16, 1897, President McKinley signed the treaty, negotiated by Hatch, annexing Hawaiʻi as a territory of the United States.

But Congress continued to delay the treaty, refusing to approve it for over a year after the signing. On May 3, 1898, 11 months after the President signed the Treaty of Annexation, Hatch met with former U.S. Secretary of State John W. Foster to “discuss mobilization of the annexation forces”. For the next two months, Hatch orchestrated the support for enough votes to pass the Joint Resolution. After 17 days of filibuster, the Senate passed the Joint Resolution on July 7, 1898, and President McKinley added, in bold script, “Approved,” along with his signature.

== Later life ==
After Hawaiʻi became a territory of the United States, President Dole was instituted as Governor of the Territory of Hawaiʻi, and Hatch returned to his private law practice in 1898. In 1904, he was appointed to the Territorial Hawaiian Supreme Court by President Teddy Roosevelt but left in 1905. Hatch died in 1923 in Honolulu and is buried with his wife, Alicia, in Rock Creek Cemetery in Washington, D.C.
