= Antonio Perry =

American judge (1871–1944)

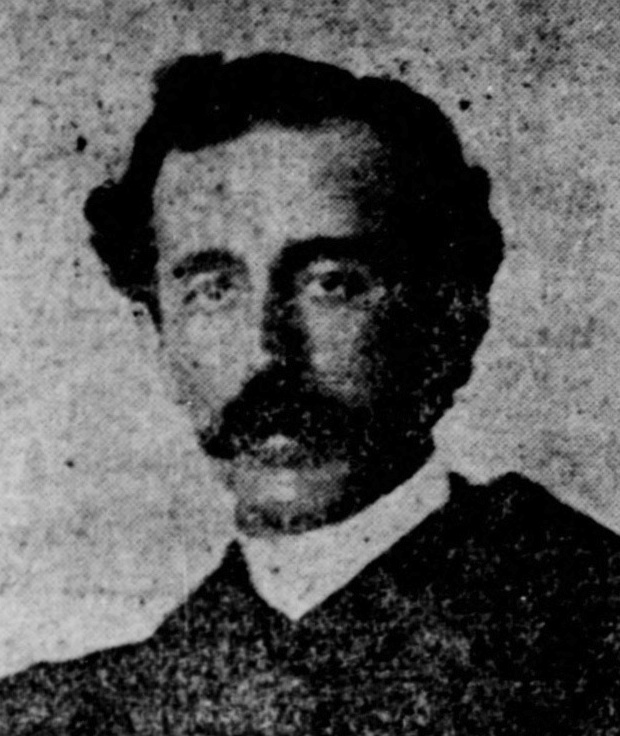

Antonio Perry (January 5, 1871 – July 13, 1944) was a justice of the Supreme Court of Hawaii from July 5, 1900, to June 15, 1904, again from May 6, 1909, to April 2, 1914, and a third time from April 17, 1922, to July 3, 1934, serving as chief justice from February 26, 1926, to July 3, 1934.

== Early life and education ==
Born in Honolulu to Jason and Anna (Henriques) Perry, his father came to Honolulu in 1861 from Faial Island in the Azores, and was Portuguese consul at Honolulu for many years. Perry was educated at old Fort Street School, St. Alban's College, and Punahou School. He read law in the office of Alfred S. Hartwell in 1891, and gained admission to the bar in 1893.

== Judicial career ==
He was appointed as a district magistrate for Honolulu on September 1, 1894, serving until 1896, when he was elevated to the position of circuit judge for the first circuit. In 1900, he was named an associate justice of the Hawaii Territorial Supreme Court, serving until 1904. He was appointed to the court again from 1909 to 1914, and a third time from 1922 to 1934, serving as chief justice from February 26, 1926, until the end of his service on the court.

== Personal life ==
Perry married Eugenia May Vanderburgh in San Francisco on January 9, 1912. They had two children, Eugenia Jacqueline and Gail Antonia.

Perry died at The Queen's Medical Center in Honolulu after suffering a fall in his home.
