= Samuel B. Kemp =

American judge (1871–1962)

Samuel Barnett Kemp
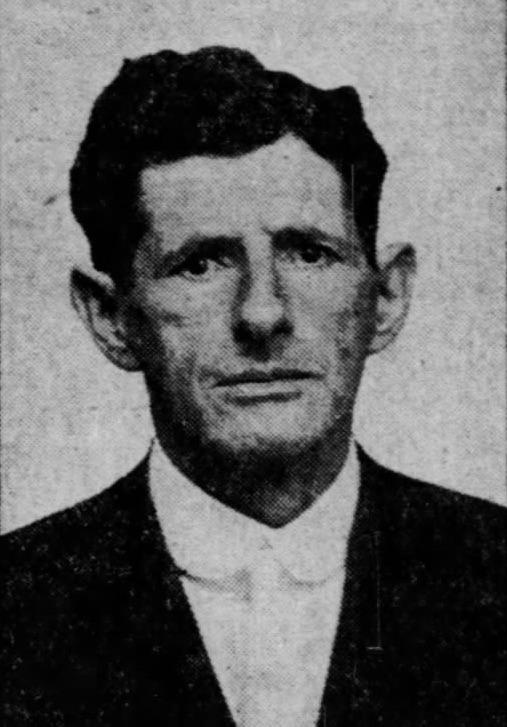

Judge of Coke County, Texas
- In office 1914–1916

Assistant United States Attorney
- Incumbent
- Assumed office 1916

Judge of the First Circuit Court of Hawaii
- In office March 20, 1917 – March 7, 1918
- Appointed by: Woodrow Wilson

Associate Justice of the Territorial Supreme Court
- In office March 7, 1918 – April 17, 1922
- Appointed by: Woodrow Wilson

Personal details
- Born: December 26, 1871; Austin, Texas
- Died: August 14, 1962 (aged 90); Honolulu, Hawaii
- Spouse: May S. Hope (m. 1904)
- Education: Agricultural and Mechanical College of Texas; University of Texas

Samuel Barnett Kemp (December 26, 1871 – August 14, 1962) was a justice of the Hawaii Supreme Court from March 7, 1918 to April 17, 1922, and again as chief justice from June 20, 1941 to June 30, 1950.

Born in Austin, Texas to James B. and Eliza S. (Woodward) Kemp, Kemp was educated in the public schools of Texas.

Kemp attended the Agricultural and Mechanical College of Texas, and in 1900 received an LL.B. from the University of Texas, thereafter beginning his legal career in Austin. In 1914 Kemp became the judge of Coke County, Texas, serving in that capacity until 1916, when he moved to Honolulu to become assistant United States Attorney. Kemp was appointed to the First Circuit court of Hawaii on March 20, 1917, by President Woodrow Wilson. On March 7, 1918, Wilson elevated Kemp to serve as an associate justice of the Territorial Supreme Court. Kemp retired from the court on April 17, 1922, when Kemp "retired to private practice in partnership with S. C. Huber, former United States attorney for Hawaii", also serving as president and director of the Hawaii Lumber Co., Ltd.

Kemp returned to public service in the 1930s, serving as a member of the Board of Prison Directors from July 27, 1935 to September 3, 1935, and of the Hawaii Housing Authority from August 27, 1935 to January 11, 1937. He also served as a member of the Public Utilities Commission from January 29, 1936 to January 6, 1937, and on the Farm Loan Board from January 30, 1937 to July 12, 1938. From December 1936 to December 1940, Kemp was Attorney General of Hawaii.

From June 5, 1941 to June 5, 1953, Kemp served on the Territorial Loyalty Board. On June 20, 1941, Kemp returned to the Hawaii Supreme Court as Chief Justice, having been appointed to the position by President Franklin D. Roosevelt.

== Personal life ==
Kemp married May S. Hope in 1904, with whom he had a daughter, Dorothy Kemp, who attended Punahou School.

In 1958, Kemp attended the 75 anniversary celebration of the University of Texas, and having come from Hawaii for the event was noted as having traveled the farthest to attend. He died in Honolulu in 1962, at the age of 91.
