= Hawaii v. Wilson =

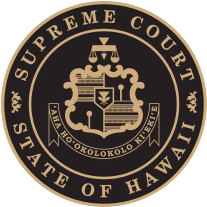
- Court: Supreme Court of Hawaii
- Decided: February 7, 2024

Court membership
- Chief judge: Mark E. Recktenwald
- Associate judges: Sabrina McKenna; Todd W. Eddins; Lisa M. Ginoza; Vladimir Devens

Case opinions
- "The spirit of Aloha clashes with a federally-mandated lifestyle that lets citizens walk around with deadly weapons during day-to-day activities"

State of Hawaiʻi v. Christopher L. Wilson is a landmark decision of the Supreme Court of Hawaii.

It concluded that "there is no state constitutional right to carry a firearm in public" and that "as the world turns, it makes no sense for contemporary society to pledge allegiance to the founding era’s culture, realities, laws, and understanding of the [American] Constitution." The case drew widespread popular attention for citing The Wire and the "Spirit of Aloha". Some legal analysts have called the decision a form of nullification.

The justices also criticized the Supreme Court of the United States.

== Overview ==
=== History ===
According to Newsweek:

Christopher Wilson was charged with keeping a firearm in an improper place and keeping ammunition in an improper place after being arrested on December 7, 2017, in the West Maui Mountains. He was found in possession of a handgun that had been loaded with a 10-round magazine, which he insisted was for self-defense, without a permit as required by state law.

and that:

Wilson's legal team moved to dismiss the charges, arguing they violated the Second Amendment in the context of the 2022 Supreme Court ruling in New York State Rifle & Pistol Association v. Bruen. This motion was granted by Hawaii's Circuit Court of the Second Circuit though this was appealed by the state, taking the case to the state's supreme court.

=== Ruling ===
The court stated: "We read those words differently than the current United States Supreme Court," Eddins wrote. "We hold that in Hawaii there is no state constitutional right to carry a firearm in public."

== Reception ==
Legal analyst Jonathan Turley criticized the decision for its popular culture references and reasoning, arguing that it amounted to illegally nullifying the Second Amendment.
