= Craig H. Nakamura =

American judge

Craig Nakamura

Chief Judge of the Hawaii Intermediate Court of Appeals
- In office September 16, 2009 – March 2018
- Appointed by: Linda Lingle
- Succeeded by: Alexa D.M. Fujise (acting)

Judge of the Hawaii Intermediate Court of Appeals
- In office April 8, 2004 – September 16, 2009
- Appointed by: Linda Lingle
- Succeeded by: Lawrence M. Reifurth

Personal details
- Born: July 19, 1956 (age 69) Honolulu, Hawaii
- Education: University of Hawaiʻi BA; Harvard University JD

Craig H. Nakamura (born July 19, 1956) is a former judge of the Hawaii Intermediate Court of Appeals.

== Education ==
Nakamura received a Bachelor of Arts from the University of Hawaiʻi in 1978, and a Juris Doctor from Harvard Law School, graduating cum laude in 1981.

== Career ==
After law school, Nakamura served as a law clerk for United States circuit judge Herbert Choy. He then worked as an associate attorney with the law firm of Goodsill, Anderson, Quinn & Stifel. Then, in 1986, he became an assistant United States attorney and was in this position until his appointment to the Hawaii Intermediate Court of Appeals. He previously taught appellate advocacy as an adjunct professor at the William S. Richardson School of Law and served as a director of the Hawaii State Bar Association.

=== Judicial career ===
Nakamura was appointed to the court on Intermediate Court of Appeals as an associate judge on April 8, 2004 by Governor Linda Lingle. On July 22, 2009 Nakamura was named chief judge of the court by Governor Linda Lingle. He was sworn in as chief judge on September 16, 2009. He retired from active service in March 2018.

== See also ==
- List of Asian American jurists

Legal offices
Unknown	Judge of the Hawaii Intermediate Court of Appeals; 2004–2009	Succeeded by Lawrence M. Reifurth
Unknown	Chief Judge of the Hawaii Intermediate Court of Appeals; 2009–2018	Succeeded by Alexa D.M. Fujise (Acting)
