= Derrick H.M. Chan =

American judge

Judge of the Hawaii Intermediate Court of Appeals
- In office April 13, 2017 – October 2020
- Appointed by: David Ige
- Preceded by: Daniel Foley
- Succeeded by: Sonja McCullen

Personal details
- Born: December 1, 1955 (age 70) Honolulu, Hawaii
- Education: University of Hawaiʻi (B.A.); California Western School of Law (J.D.)

Derrick H.M. Chan (born December 1, 1955) is a former judge of the Hawaii Intermediate Court of Appeals.

== Education ==
Chan received his Bachelor of Arts from the University of Hawaiʻi and his Juris Doctor from California Western School of Law.

== Legal career ==
Chan served as First Deputy Prosecutor for the County of Kauaʻi. He also served as an attorney for the Hawaii Carpenters Union, as Deputy Public Defender for the state, law clerk to Judge Wilfred Watanabe, and Deputy Attorney General for the state.

== State court service ==
He appointed as a Circuit Court Judge on Aug. 25, 2000.

== Service on the Hawaii Intermediate Court of Appeals ==
On February 3, 2017 Governor David Ige nominated Chan to be a Judge of the Intermediate Court of Appeals to the seat vacated by the retirement of Daniel R. Foley. His nomination was confirmed by the state senate on March 3, 2017. He was sworn in on April 13, 2017. Chan was among those considered to become Chief Judge of the Hawaii Intermediate Court of Appeals.

Chan retired from the court in October 2020.

== Hawaii Supreme Court vacancy ==
In November 2011 Chan was considered to fill a vacancy on the Hawaii Supreme Court.

== See also ==
- List of Asian American jurists

Legal offices
Preceded by Daniel Foley	Judge of the Hawaii Intermediate Court of Appeals; 2017–2020	Succeeded by Sonja McCullen
