= Michael D. Wilson =

American judge

Associate Justice of the Hawaii Supreme Court
- In office April 17, 2014 – March 31, 2023
- Nominated by: Neil Abercrombie
- Preceded by: Simeon R. Acoba
- Succeeded by: Lisa M. Ginoza

Personal details
- Born: April 1953 (age 72–73)
- Education: University of Wisconsin–Madison (BS); Antioch School of Law (JD)

Michael D. Wilson (born April 1953) is an American lawyer who served as an associate justice of the Hawaii Supreme Court from 2014 to 2023. Prior to being appointed to the Hawaii Supreme Court, Wilson served as a circuit court judge for the Hawaii First Circuit from 2000 to 2014.

== Education ==
Wilson received a Bachelor of Science from University of Wisconsin-Madison in 1975 and a Juris Doctor from Antioch School of Law in Washington D.C. in 1979. He was raised in Kailua and graduated from Kailua High School.

== Career ==
Early in his career, he was a partner in the law firms of Pavey Wilson & Glickstein and Hart Wolff & Wilson where he practiced civil and criminal trial and appellate law. He previously served as the director of the Hawaii Department of Land and Natural Resources, chair of the Board of Land and Natural Resources, chair of the State Water Commission and a trustee of the Kahoolawe Island Reserve Commission.

=== Judicial service ===
Wilson was appointed as a judge of the Hawaii First Circuit on May 10, 2000. On February 18, 2014, Governor Neil Abercrombie appointed Wilson to serve as a justice of the Hawaii Supreme Court to fill the vacancy left by the mandatory retirement of Simeon R. Acoba. He was Abercrombie's third appointment to the supreme court. On March 17, 2014, his nomination was approved by the Hawaii Senate by a 23–1 vote. He was sworn into office on April 17, 2014. He retired from the court on March 31, 2023.

== Career ==
Justice Wilson is a founding member of the Global Judicial Institute on the Environment and serves as an adjunct faculty member at the Jindal Global Law School in Sonipat, India.

Legal offices
Preceded by Simeon R. Acoba	Associate Justice of the Hawaii Supreme Court; 2014–2023	Succeeded by Lisa M. Ginoza
