= Keith K. Hiraoka =

American judge

Judge of the Hawaii Intermediate Court of Appeals
- Incumbent
- Assumed office November 19, 2018
- Appointed by: David Ige
- Preceded by: Lisa M. Ginoza

Personal details
- Born: Portland, Oregon
- Education: University of Hawaii at Manoa; UC Berkeley School of Law (JD)

Keith K. Hiraoka (1958) is a Judge of the Hawaii Intermediate Court of Appeals.

== Education ==
Hiraoka earned an undergraduate degree from the University of Hawaiʻi at Mānoa in 1980 and a Juris Doctor from the UC Berkeley School of Law in 1983.

== Legal and academic career ==
Hiraoka has practiced law in Hawaii since 1983. Prior appointment to the bench he was the managing partner of the law firm formerly known as Roeca Luria Hiraoka. His primary practice areas were legal malpractice defense and insurance coverage counseling and litigation. He was formerly chair of the HSBA Insurance Coverage Litigation Section and a co-chair of the HSBA Professional Responsibility and Risk Management Committee. Prior to his appointment to the Court of Appeals he served as a Judge on the First Circuit Court of Hawaii. He has lectured at the William S. Richardson School of Law in civil procedure, evidence, pretrial practice, and legal methods.

== Service on the Hawaii Intermediate Court of Appeals ==
On October 5, 2018, Governor David Ige nominated Hiraoka to be a Judge on the Hawaii Intermediate Court of Appeals to the seat vacated by Lisa M. Ginoza who was elevated to Chief Judge. He was ceremoniously sworn into office on November 29, 2018. His appointment to the court was criticized for being a pay to play reward for being Ige's former campaign manager and donor.

== See also ==
- List of Asian American jurists

Legal offices
Preceded by Lisa M. Ginoza	Judge of the Hawaii Intermediate Court of Appeals; 2018–present	Incumbent
