= Sunoco v. Honolulu =

- Court: Supreme Court of Hawaii
- Decided: October 31, 2023

Court membership
- Chief judge: Mark E. Recktenwald
- Associate judges: Sabrina McKenna, Todd W. Eddins

Case opinions
- "Defendants appeal of the circuit court's denial of their motion to dismiss due to lack of jurisdiction and failure to state a claim is rejected."
- Decision by: Mark E. Recktenwald
- Concurrence: Todd W. Eddins

Sunoco v. Honolulu & Shell v. Honolulu (Docket 23-947 & 23-952) was a landmark Supreme Court of Hawaii case that held that state-law provides the jurisdiction for claims against oil and gas producers. It is a tort law case related to whether federal law prohibits state-law claims for compensation for the effects that Greenhouse-gas emissions has on global climate.

== Background and Lower Courts ruling ==
The City and County of Honolulu brought suit against a group of oil and gas companies in 2021, alleging that these companies failed to take the adequate steps to warn the state of the potential consequences that arose from their business practices on the global climate.

In response to the suit, these companies moved to dismiss the suit for failing to state a claim in the Hawaii state circuit court of the first circuit. The companies argued that the state essentially sought to "regulate global fossil fuel emissions", characterising it as "de facto regulation" and the push forward the claim that federal common law pre-empts this case. Whereas, the state rebuts by stating that under tort law, these companies had a "duty to disclose and not be deceptive about the dangers of fossil fuel emissions, and breached those duties". Ultimately, the court rejected the companies arguments, stating that the state's case was more accurate and rejects the companies claim that this was a broad claim on all damages from climate change, but rather the damages caused by the companies in violation of Hawaii's state law.

This was further appealed to the Supreme Court of Hawaii. On October 31, 2023, the Supreme Court of Hawaii similarly rejected the oil and gas companies argument that this case should be brought under federal law and can proceed under Hawaii's state law.

== Supreme Court of the United States ==
On February 29, 2024, a writ of Certiorari was filed in the Supreme Court of the United States, seeking review in this case. The petition was denied on January 13, 2025.
