= Katherine G. Leonard =

American judge

Chief Judge of the Hawaii Intermediate Court of Appeals
- Acting
- In office January 13, 2024 – July 1, 2025
- Preceded by: Lisa M. Ginoza
- Succeeded by: Karen T. Nakasone

Judge of the Hawaii Intermediate Court of Appeals
- Incumbent
- Assumed office January 30, 2008
- Appointed by: Linda Lingle
- Preceded by: John Lim

Personal details
- Born: August 1, 1959 (age 66) Honolulu, Hawaii
- Party: Democratic
- Education: University of Wisconsin–Parkside, (B.A.); William S. Richardson School of Law, (J.D.)

Katherine G. Leonard (born August 1, 1959) is a Judge of the Hawaii Intermediate Court of Appeals.

== Education ==
Leonard received her undergraduate degree from the University of Wisconsin–Parkside, and her Juris Doctor from the William S. Richardson School of Law at the University of Hawaii.

== Legal career ==
After graduating law school she was a law clerk for Justice Robert Klein. In 1992, Leonard joined the law firm of Carlsmith Ball LLP, where she was a partner for over ten years prior to her judicial appointment. As a lawyer, she practiced in complex commercial, financial, real estate, environmental, trust and business law litigation and dispute resolution.

== Service on the Hawaii Intermediate Court of Appeals ==
She was nominated to the court by former Governor Linda Lingle in November 2007 to fill the seat vacated by the death of Judge John Lim; she was confirmed unanimously by the Hawaii State Senate. She was sworn in as an Associate Judge of the Intermediate Court of Appeals on January 30, 2008.

== Memberships and awards ==
Leonard is a member of the American Judicature Society. She also participates in the American Bar Association Appellate Judges Conference. She is a member of the American Bar Association and the Hawaii State Bar Association.

== Personal life ==
She is married to Ian Sandison and has one son and two stepchildren.

Legal offices
Preceded by John Lim	Judge of the Hawaii Intermediate Court of Appeals; 2008–present	Incumbent
Preceded by Lisa M. Ginoza	Chief Judge of the Hawaii Intermediate Court of Appeals; Acting; 2024–2025	Succeeded by Karen T. Nakasone
