= Robert G. Klein =

American judge (born ca. 1948)

Robert Gordon Klein (born November 11, 1947) is a former justice of the Supreme Court of Hawaii from March 31, 1992, to February 4, 2000. He was appointed by governor John Waihee. He left office 8 years into his 10-year term to join a private firm. He is of part Native Hawaiian descent.

Klein graduated from Punahou School in 1965. He graduated from Stanford University and the University of Oregon School of Law. In 1972 when he was appointed law clerk for Chief Justice William S. Richardson U.S. President Bill Clinton appointed him to the 9th Circuit Court of Appeals in 1994, but he withdrew his name after failing to be confirmed by the Republican Party controlled U.S. Senate.

Katherine Leonard clerked for him.

Political offices
Preceded by Yoshimi Hayashi	Justice of the Supreme Court of Hawaii; 1992–2000	Succeeded by Simeon R. Acoba
