= Florence T. Nakakuni =

American attorney

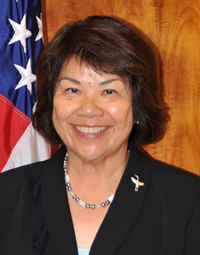

United States Attorney for the District of Hawaii
- In office September 30, 2009 – March 10, 2017
- President: Barack Obama; Donald Trump
- Preceded by: Edward H. Kubo Jr.
- Succeeded by: Kenji M. Price

Personal details
- Born: 1952 (age 73–74) Palolo, Hawaii, U.S.
- Education: University of Hawaii (BA, JD)
- Profession: Attorney

Florence T. Nakakuni (born 1952) is the former United States Attorney for the District of Hawaii. She was appointed in 2009 by President Barack Obama, replacing Edward H. Kubo Jr. who left to become a Judge on the Hawaii First Circuit Court. She is the first female United States Attorney for the District of Hawaii. As one of 93 U.S. Attorneys nationwide, she represented the United States government in all civil and criminal cases within the district.

== Early life and career ==
Nakakuni grew up in Palolo, Hawaii, and attended Kaimuki High School. She initially wanted to be a high school English teacher, but changed career paths after college.

After graduating from the University of Hawaiʻi at Mānoa and the William S. Richardson School of Law in 1975 and 1978, respectively, she clerked for Justice Thomas Ogata of the Hawaii Supreme Court. She then worked as an attorney-adviser in the Office of Information and Privacy Appeals at the United States Department of Justice in Washington, D.C. After a few years, she returned to Hawaii, working first for the General Counsel of the United States Navy in Pearl Harbor, Hawaii, and then joining the United States Attorney for the District of Hawaii's Office in 1985. Just prior to her appointment as US Attorney, she served as Chief of the Organized Crime and Narcotics section of the Criminal Division.

== See also ==
- 2017 dismissal of U.S. attorneys

Political offices
Preceded by Edward H. Kubo Jr.	United States Attorney for the District of Hawaii; 2009–2017	Succeeded by Kenji M. Price
