= United States Attorney for the District of Hawaii =

The United States attorney for the District of Hawaii is the chief law enforcement officer representing the federal government in the United States District Court for the District of Hawaii and principal authority of the United States Department of Justice in the state of Hawaii. Additionally, they have the unique responsibility of overseeing law enforcement and prosecuting crimes for all Americans based in Antarctica. The United States attorney administers the duties of the office from the Prince Kuhio Federal Building in downtown Honolulu near the Aloha Tower and Honolulu Harbor.

The Judiciary Act of 1789 describes the role of the United States attorney as, "A person learned in the law to act as attorney for the United States whose duty it shall be to prosecute in each district all delinquents for crimes and offenses cognizable under the authority of the United States and all civil actions in which the United States shall be concerned." The United States attorney is appointed by the president of the United States and upon confirmation of the United States Senate serves a term of four years. The United States attorney has been historically chosen from the same political party that the President professes membership.

The United States attorney administers a staff consisting of twenty-eight assistant United States attorneys. The United States attorney has ordinary jurisdiction over all civilian and military special assistant United States attorneys and serves as a member of the Executive Office for U.S. Attorneys (EOUSA),

== List of U.S. attorneys for the District of Hawaii ==
- John C. Baird 1900
- J. J. Dunne 1901–02
- Robert W. Breckons 1902–13
- Jeff McCarn 1913–15
- Horace W. Vaughan 1915–16
- S. C. Huber 1916–22
- William T. Carden 1922–24
- Fred Patterson 1924–25
- Charles F. Parsons 1925–26
- Sanford B. D. Wood 1926–34
- Ingram M. Stainback 1934–40
- Angus M. Taylor Jr. 1940–43
- Douglas G. Crozier 1943–45
- Edward A. Towse 1945
- Ray J. O'Brien 1945–51
- Howard K. Hoddick 1951–52
- A.William Barlow 1952–54
- Louis B. Blissard 1954–61
- Herman T. F. Lum 1961–67
- Yoshima Hayashi 1967–69
- Robert K. Fukuda 1969–73
- Harold M. Fong 1973–78
- Walter M. Heen 1978–81
- Wallace W. Weatherwax 1981–83
- Daniel A. Bent 1983–93
- Elliot Enoki 1993–94
- Steven S. Alm: 1994–2001
- Edward H. Kubo Jr.: December 7, 2001–2009
- Florence T. Nakakuni: September 30, 2009–March 11, 2017
- Elliot Enoki (Acting): March 11, 2017–January 3, 2018
- Kenji Price: January 3, 2018–February 21, 2021
- Judith A. Philips (Acting): February 21, 2021–January 3, 2022
- Clare E. Connors: January 3, 2022–January 20, 2025
- Ken Sorenson: January 20, 2025–
