= Alexa D.M. Fujise =

American judge (born 1954)

Alexa Fujise

Judge of the Hawaii Intermediate Court of Appeals
- Incumbent
- Assumed office June 10, 2004
- Appointed by: Linda Lingle

Personal details
- Born: July 17, 1954 (age 71) Honolulu, Hawaii
- Education: University of Hawaiʻi (BA); University of Hawaiʻi at Mānoa (JD)

Alexa Denise Mariko Fujise (born July 17, 1954) is a judge of the Hawaii Intermediate Court of Appeals.

== Education ==
Fuise received her bachelor's and law degrees from the University of Hawaiʻi.

== Career ==
Fujise served as director of the Research and Reference Support Division of the Prosecutor's Office. She also served as appellate research branch chief and deputy prosecutor.

Fujise also served as an assistant disciplinary counsel for the Office of Disciplinary Counsel and as a law clerk for then-Associate Justice Herman Lum. She has taught appellate practice seminars for the National District Attorneys Association and the William S. Richardson School of Law.

=== Hawaii Intermediate Court of Appeals ===
Fujise was nominated to the court by former Governor Linda Lingle in March 2004 and assumed office on June 10, 2004.

== Memberships and awards ==
Fujise has been on the Board of the William S. Richardson School of Law Alumni Association since 1980 and was the recipient of the Dean's Distinguished Alumni Award in 2005.

== See also ==
- List of Asian American jurists

Legal offices
Unknown	Judge of the Hawaii Intermediate Court of Appeals; 2004–present	Incumbent
