= California v. Big Oil =

- Court: San Francisco County Superior Court

California v. Big Oil, is a lawsuit filed in 2023 by the State of California against Big Oil. The suit alleges that big oil deceived the public for decades about the impacts of fossil fuels. The suit names Exxon, Shell plc, Chevron Corporation, ConocoPhillips, BP and the American Petroleum Institute as defendants. The suit, while one of many, was described as the "most significant lawsuit to target oil, gas and coal companies over their role in causing climate change".

== Background ==
Big oil has known about the effects of fossil fuels since at least the 1950s. While internal research showed links between fossil fuels and climate change, big oil concealed this and led a campaign of climate change denial. The lawsuit follows the Supreme Court's decision not to consider an appeal brought by the oil industry and 20 states (Alabama, Alaska, Arkansas, Georgia, Idaho, Indiana, Iowa, Kansas, Kentucky, Louisiana, Mississippi, Missouri, Montana, Nebraska, North Dakota, Oklahoma, South Carolina, Texas, Utah, and Wyoming) in Sunoco v. Honolulu.
