= James E. Duffy Jr. =

American judge

James Earl Duffy Jr. (born June 4, 1942) is a retired associate justice of the Hawaii State Supreme Court. He served on the court from 2003 to 2013. He also is a former federal judicial nominee to the U.S. Court of Appeals for the Ninth Circuit.

== Early life and education ==
Born in St. Paul, Minnesota, Duffy graduated from Cretin High School in Saint Paul, Minnesota, Duffy earned a bachelor's degree from the College of St. Thomas in 1965. He then went on to Marquette University to obtain his doctorate of jurisprudence in 1968.

== Professional career ==
Duffy began his legal career in 1968 at the law firm Cobb & Gould where he became an associate. He joined the law firm Chuck & Fujiyama in Honolulu, Hawaii as an associate. In 1975, Duffy became a senior partner and the firm was renamed Fujiyama, Duffy & Fujiyama. Duffy retired from Fujiyama, Duffy & Fujiyama in 2000 and worked as a mediator from 2000 until his appointment to the Hawaii State Supreme Court in 2003.

== Unsuccessful nomination to the U.S. Court of Appeals for the Ninth Circuit ==
On June 17, 1999, President Bill Clinton nominated Duffy to a seat on the U.S. Court of Appeals for the Ninth Circuit to replace Judge Cynthia Holcomb Hall, who had taken senior status on August 31, 1997. Although Duffy had the support of both of Hawaii's U.S. senators at the time, his nomination languished in the Republican-led Senate, which declined to hold a U.S. Senate Judiciary Committee hearing or vote on his nomination.

In a quixotic move, Clinton renominated Duffy and several other appeals-court nominees on January 3, 2001. President George W. Bush on March 20, 2001, withdrew Duffy's nomination, along with those of 62 other executive and judicial nominees, choosing not to renominate Duffy.

Later in 2001, Bush nominated Richard R. Clifton of Hawaii for the seat to which Duffy had been nominated, and Clifton was confirmed in a 98–0 vote of the U.S. Senate on July 30, 2002.

== Nomination to and service on the Hawaii State Supreme Court ==
In 2003, Hawaii Governor Linda Lingle appointed Duffy from his private practice to the five-member Hawaii State Supreme Court. Though appointed by a governor from the Hawaii Republican Party, Duffy is a member of the Hawaii Democratic Party.

"Hawaii has been very good to me, both personally and professionally, and this is my opportunity to pay back some of the good things that have been done for me in the practice of law and personally," Duffy said at a news conference while standing next to Lingle, according to an April 15, 2003 Associated Press article.

== See also ==
- Bill Clinton judicial appointment controversies

Government offices
Preceded by	Supreme Court of Hawaii Associate Justice; 2003–2012	Succeeded by Richard W. Pollack
