= Richard Pollack =

Richard Pollack may refer to:

- Richard W. Pollack (born 1950), associate justice of the Supreme Court of Hawaii
- Richard M. Pollack (born 1935), professor at New York University
- Rachel Pollack (born Richard Pollack in 1945), American author
- Richard J. Pollack, President and CEO of the American Hospital Association
