= Ronald Moon =

American judge (1940–2022)

Chief Justice of the Supreme Court of Hawaii
- In office March 31, 1993 – August 31, 2010
- Preceded by: Herman T. F. Lum
- Succeeded by: Mark E. Recktenwald

Justice of the Supreme Court of Hawaii
- In office March 9, 1990 – August 31, 2010
- Preceded by: Edward Nakamura

Personal details
- Born: September 4, 1940
- Died: July 4, 2022 (aged 81)
- Education: Coe College (BS); University of Iowa (JD)

Ronald T. Y. Moon (September 4, 1940 – July 4, 2022) was the Chief Justice of the Hawaii State Supreme Court in Honolulu, Hawaii. He served his first term from 1993 to 2003, and his second term from 2003 until retiring in August 2010. Moon studied at Coe College towards bachelor's degrees in psychology and sociology. He went on to the University of Iowa College of Law, where he obtained his Juris Doctor. He returned to Honolulu in 1965 and became law clerk to United States District Court Judge Martin Pence. He served under Pence for a year. In 1966, Moon joined the staff of the Prosecuting Attorney of Honolulu where he was deputy prosecutor until 1968. He left public service to become a partner in the law firm Libkuman, Ventura, Moon and Ayabe where he stayed until 1982. It was from the law firm that Governor George Ariyoshi appointed Moon to the Hawaii State Judiciary as a circuit court judge. Governor John Waihee then elevated Moon to the office of Associate Justice of the Hawaii State Supreme Court in 1990. In 1993, Moon was once again elevated to become chief justice. He retired on August 31, 2010.

On May 5, 1993, Chief Justice Moon, joined by Justice Steven Levinson, ruled that the State of Hawaii must have compelling reasons to justify excluding same-sex couples from marriage in the case of Baehr v. Miike. This decision was the first in the world that suggested same-sex couples should be granted equal marriage rights. His decision did not gain a majority, but Court of Appeals Judge James S. Burns, who was filling in for a recused Justice, wrote a concurrence agreeing with the result of Moon's opinion.

Moon was of Korean descent. His grandparents were among the first Korean immigrants to Hawaii.

== See also ==
- List of Asian American jurists
