= Lawrence M. Reifurth =

American judge

Judge of the Hawaii Intermediate Court of Appeals
- In office March 11, 2010 – August 2019
- Appointed by: Linda Lingle
- Preceded by: Craig H. Nakamura
- Succeeded by: Clyde J. Wadsworth

Personal details
- Born: November 25, 1957 (age 68) Honolulu, Hawaii
- Education: Marquette University, (B.S.); Kellogg School of Management, (M.B.A.); Northwestern University School of Law, (J.D.)

Lawrence M. Reifurth (born November 25, 1957) is a former Judge of the Hawaii Intermediate Court of Appeals.

== Education ==
Reifurth received his Bachelor of Science in economics from Marquette University in 1979, his Master of Business Administration from the Kellogg School of Management in 1981, and his Juris Doctor from the Northwestern University School of Law in 1983.

== Legal career ==
After law school, Reifurth worked in private practice in San Francisco and Marin Counties in California. After moving to Hawaii in 1989, he worked as a deputy attorney general until 1994, when he was appointed by Governor John Waihee to serve as the State Insurance Commissioner. He worked in private practice at Oshima Chun Fong & Chung. In 2003, he was appointed by Governor Linda Lingle to serve as Deputy Director of the Department of Commerce and Consumer Affairs. In 2007, he was appointed as Director of the Department, where he served until his appointment to the Intermediate Court of Appeals.

== Service on the Hawaii Intermediate Court of Appeals ==
He was nominated on January 7, 2010 to fill the vacancy left by the elevation of Craig H. Nakamura to be Chief Judge of the court. On February 5, 2010 he was confirmed unanimously by the Hawaii Senate. He was sworn into office on March 10, 2011. He retired in August 2019.

Legal offices
Preceded by Craig H. Nakamura	Judge of the Hawaii Intermediate Court of Appeals; 2010–2019	Succeeded by Clyde J. Wadsworth
