= Aviam Soifer =

American legal scholar (born 1948)

- Born: 1948 (age 77–78); Worcester, Massachusetts, U.S.
- Occupations: Legal Scholar, Lawyer, Professor of Law

Academic background
- Education: Yale University (BA, MA, JD)
- Influences: Jon O. Newman

Academic work
- Discipline: Law
- Institutions: University of Connecticut; Boston University; Boston College
- Main interests: Constitutional law

Aviam Soifer (born 1948) is an American legal scholar who worked on high-profile matters for the American Civil Liberties Union and later served as dean of two American law schools, at the Boston College Law School from 1993 to 1998, and at the William S. Richardson School of Law at University of Hawaiʻi at Mānoa from 2003 to 2020. He is an elected member of the American Law Institute.

== Early life and education ==
Born in Worcester, Massachusetts to Samuel I. Soifer, Soifer attended the public schools of Holyoke, Massachusetts, and graduated from Theodore Roosevelt High School in Des Moines, Iowa. While an undergraduate student at Yale University, Soifer headed a student steering committee that invited female students to inhabit dorms vacated by the male students, to demonstrate that they would be comfortable in a coeducational environment. Soifer played a fundamental role in convincing then-Dean Kingman Brewster Jr. to commit to coeducation at Yale College.

Soifer earned his Bachelor of Arts at Yale University in 1969, and a Master of Urban Studies at the same institution in 1972. In 1972, he also earned his Juris Doctor at Yale Law School, where he was an editor on the Yale Law Journal. Upon graduation, Soifer became a law clerk for Jon O. Newman.

== Career ==
=== Academic career and litigation work ===
Following his clerkship, Soifer became a professor at the University of Connecticut School of Law, and in 1974, was among the law professors there who voiced objecting to President Richard Nixon's appointment of Connecticut Governor Thomas Meskill to the United States Court of Appeals for the Second Circuit. Soifer "wrote briefs for the American Civil Liberties Union" and became "nationally renowned for legal crusades on behalf of civil rights and women's rights". He worked on the case of United States v. Progressive, Inc., defending the right of The Progressive magazine to publish an article purporting to reveal the "secret" of the hydrogen bomb, arguing that the information could not be deemed classified because it had been compiled from publicly available sources. At one point during a discussion of the case with reporters at ACLU headquarters by Soifer and Morton Halperin, "a Department of Energy official entered the small conference room... and asked for whatever was being handed out". From 1976 until 1977, Soifer studied at Harvard University as a fellow.

Soifer became a professor at the Boston College Law School, and in the late 1970s and early 1980s, Soifer engaged in a study of paternalism, identifying "three significant varieties of parernalism: providing, deciding, and protecting". Noting that people tend to consider paternalism to be offensive, Soifer found that it was an inevitable function of society, and its application could be identified in Supreme Court decisions. In 1982, Soifer concurred with Lawrence G. Sager that the Supreme Court was appearing to become less functional, stating that it was "losing its institutional clout and credibility" through its unusual number of fractured decisions and narrowly decided cases. In 1987, Soifer derided as a "purge" the firing of four New England School of Law professors who allegedly believed the legal system to be racially biased; Soifer joined other area law professors in signing a letter of support.

=== Deanships ===
From 1993 to 1998, Soifer was dean of the Boston College Law School. His resignation as dean of the law school was reported as being "unexpected", given his popularity among students and staff. Following his ouster as dean, Soifer arranged visiting professorships at BCLS for two other recently ousted law school deans, jokingly referring to it as his "special program for deposed deans". He remained as a professor at BCLS until he accepted the deanship at Hawaii in 2003.

Soifer is the author of many articles and book chapters, most recently in the areas of religious freedom, rights of the disabled, constitutional history, and judging/judgment. He has also authored a book, Law and the Company We Keep (Harvard University Press, 1995), which received several professional awards, and was noted for having "used works by William Faulkner to explore law's relation to racial violence". The William S. Richardson School of Law, in extending the deanship to Soifer, doubled the salary previously paid to the holder of that position. Soifer had previously spent a year in Hawaii, from 1999 to 2000, as a visiting professor during the pendency of the case of Rice v. Cayetano, which was being appealed to the Supreme Court of the United States.

In 2019, Mark E. Recktenwald, Chief Justice of the Supreme Court of Hawaii, issued a proclamation in Soifer's honor.

== Selected bibliography ==
- Soifer, Aviam (1995). Law and the Company We Keep. Cambridge, Massachusetts: Harvard University Press. ISBN 0-674-51298-7. OCLC 31708022.
- Soifer, Aviam (November 2012). "Federal protection, paternalism, and the virtually forgotten prohibition of voluntary peonage". Columbia Law Review. 112 (7). Columbia Law School: 1607–1639. JSTOR 41708160. Archived from the original on November 17, 2015. Pdf.

== Personal life ==
In August 1969, Soifer married Marlene Joan Booth.
