= Camille A. Nelson =

Canadian-Jamaican law professor

3rd Dean of the William S. Richardson School of Law
- Incumbent
- Assumed office 1 August 2020
- Preceded by: Aviam Soifer

Personal details
- Born: 1968 (age 57–58) Kingston, Jamaica
- Education: University of Toronto, (BA); University of Ottawa, (LLB); Columbia University, (LLM)
- Profession: Legal Scholar, Lawyer, Professor of Law
- Website: Official bio

Camille A. Nelson is a Canadian-Jamaican law professor and dean of the William S. Richardson School of Law at the University of Hawai’i at Manoa, Honolulu.

== Early life and education ==
Born in Jamaica, Nelson graduated with her bachelor's degree from the University of Toronto, earned her law degree from the University of Ottawa, and an LL.M. from Columbia University.

== Career ==
In 1994, Camille Nelson became the first black woman to clerk at the Supreme Court of Canada when she was selected by Justice Frank Iacobucci. In 2000, Nelson became Professor of Law at Saint Louis University School of Law. Nelson served there until becoming a Visiting Professor of Law at Washington University School of Law. In September 2010, Nelson became the first woman and the first person of color to lead Suffolk University Law School as a Dean and Professor of Law. At Suffolk, Nelson launched the Law Practice Technology and Innovation Institute, a law technology academic concentration and programs designed to provide access to legal services for people experiencing economic hardship. Nelson visited Havana during the Cuban thaw, becoming the first American law school dean to do so since the Cuban Revolution, and facilitating discussions which enabled a class of Suffolk University Law School students to attend a course in Cuba. After Suffolk, Nelson was appointed Dean and Professor of Law at the American University Washington College of Law. During Nelson's tenure AU,"[f]or the first time saw three specialty programs ranked in the top five in the 2021 U.S. News Specialty Rankings – Clinical Program #2, International Law #4, and Trial Advocacy #4." in 2017, Nelson was awarded Columbia Law School's Distinguished Alumni Award for her "excellent work as a scholar, practitioner, faculty member, and speaker, and [for her] outstanding service to the legal community". Nelson is the first woman to serve as dean of the William S. Richardson School of Law.

Nelson is an expert on the intersection of critical race theory and cultural studies with particular emphasis on criminal law and procedure, health law, and comparative law.

Academic offices
Preceded by Bernard Keenan [interim] (2008–2010)	Dean of Suffolk University Law School; 2010–2015	Succeeded by Andrew M. Perlman
Preceded by Claudio Grossman (1995–2016)	Dean of American University Washington College of Law; 2016–2020	Succeeded by Roger Fairfax
Preceded by Aviam Soifer	Dean of William S. Richardson School of Law; 2020–present	Succeeded by Incumbent
