= Norman Wong (writer) =

American writer and activist

- Born: Honolulu, Hawaii
- Education: University of Hawaii William S. Richardson School of Law (JD) Johns Hopkins University (MA) University of Chicago (BA)
- Occupations: Writer, lawyer
- Notable work: Cultural Revolution

Norman Wong is an American writer and activist. He is best known for his 1995 short story collection Cultural Revolution, which was one of the first book-length works of LGBT literature ever published by an Asian American writer.

== Biography ==
Born and raised in Honolulu, he is a graduate of the University of Chicago and Johns Hopkins University. He studied law at the William S. Richardson School of Law at the University of Hawaiʻi at Mānoa.

His stories have appeared in Men's Style, Kenyon Review, the Asian Pacific American Journal and the Threepenny Review. He taught fiction writing at the Writer's Voice and Johns Hopkins.

He is openly gay.

== Bibliography ==
- Cultural Revolution ISBN 978-0-345-39648-8
- Men on Men 4, anthology
- Men on Men 6, anthology
- Boys Like Us, anthology
