= Kānāwai Māmalahoe =

Hawaiian traditional law to protect the weak

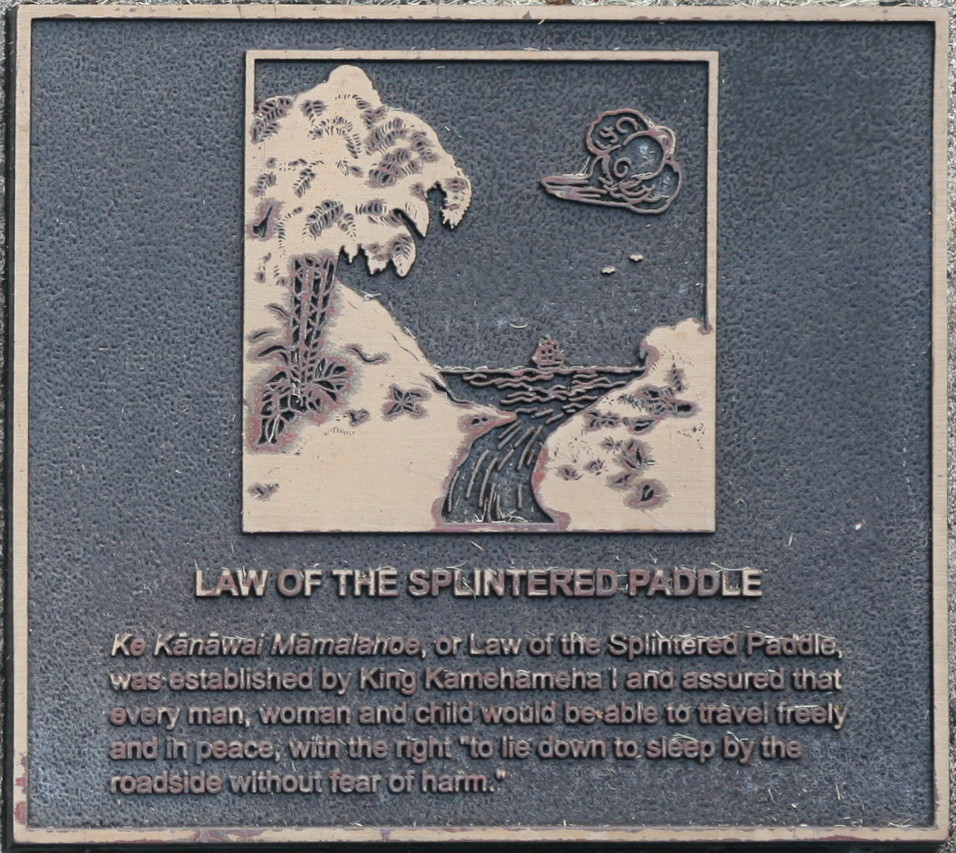
Kānāwai Māmalahoe, on a plaque under the Kamehameha statues

Kānāwai Māmalahoe, or Law of the Splintered Paddle (also translated Law of the Splintered Oar), also known as Kānāwai hoʻōla kanaka, translated as sanctity of life law, is a precept in Hawaiian law, originating with King Kamehameha I in 1797. The law, "Let every elderly person, woman and child lie by the roadside in safety," is enshrined in the state constitution, Article 9, Section 10, and has become a model for modern human rights law regarding the treatment of civilians and other non-combatants during times of war.

The law was created as a result of an incident when Kamehameha was on a military expedition in Puna. His party encountered a group of commoners on a beach. While chasing two fishermen who had stayed behind to cover the retreat of a man carrying a child, Kamehameha's leg was caught in the reef. One of the fisherman, Kaleleiki, hit him mightily on the head with a paddle in defense, which broke into pieces. Kamehameha could have been killed at that point, but the fisherman spared him. Years later, the same fisherman was brought before Kamehameha. Instead of ordering for him to be killed, Kamehameha ruled that the fisherman had only been protecting his land and family, and so the Law of the Splintered Paddle was declared.

== Text ==
The complete original 1797 law in Hawaiian

Kānāwai Māmalahoe :

E nā kānaka,
E mālama ʻoukou i ke akua
A e mālama ho‘i ke kanaka nui a me kanaka iki;
E hele ka ʻelemakule, ka luahine, a me ke kama
A moe i ke ala
ʻA‘ohe mea nāna e ho‘opilikia.

Hewa nō, make.

— Kamehameha I

English translation

Law of the Splintered Paddle:

Oh people,
Honor thy god;
respect alike [the rights of] people both great and humble;
May everyone, from the old men and women to the children
Be free to go forth and lie in the road (i.e. by the roadside or pathway)
Without fear of harm.

Break this law, and die.

== Cultural context ==
Kānāwai Māmalahoe was not a completely new invention of Kamehameha I, but rather an articulation of concepts regarding governmental legitimacy that had been held in Hawaiʻi for many prior generations. Countless stories abound in Hawaiian folklore of the removal of chiefs – generally, but not always, through popular execution – as a result of mistreatment of the common people, who have traditionally been intolerant of bad government. Both a shrewd politician and leader, as well as a skilled warrior, Kamehameha used these concepts to turn what could have been a point of major popular criticism to his political advantage, while protecting the human rights of his people for future generations.

== Modern relevance and controversy ==
Kānāwai Māmalahoe has been applied to Hawaiian rights, elder law, children's rights, homeless advocacy, and bicyclist safety. It also appears as a symbol of crossed paddles in the center of the badge of the Honolulu Police Department. Since 1955, the Chamber of Commerce of Hawaiʻi has inducted local and national figures into the "Order of the Splintered Paddle" to recognize contributions to community welfare. The first recipient was President Dwight D. Eisenhower.

It is an unofficial symbol of the William S. Richardson School of Law, reflecting its ethos for legal education. As such, particularly in consideration of the human rights concerns of the Hawaiian sovereignty movement (in which the annexation and establishment of the State of Hawaii is generally viewed as illegal because it was accomplished through legislation instead of a separate treaty), Kānāwai Māmalahoe has been the subject of extended controversy.

Issues surround the use of the law of Kamehameha I in the state's constitution and the treatment of homeless persons, especially those of native descent, many of whom reside upon ancestral lands that have been converted to public use or private property under State law. The Honolulu Star-Advertiser published an editorial discussing modern-day application of the Law of the Splintered Paddle to contemporary homeless populations living in Hawaii. The editorial advocated for support of House Bill 1889 introduced in the Hawaii legislature in 2014 and recognized a homeless persons' bill of rights.
