= Claudio Grossman =

Lawyer and law professor

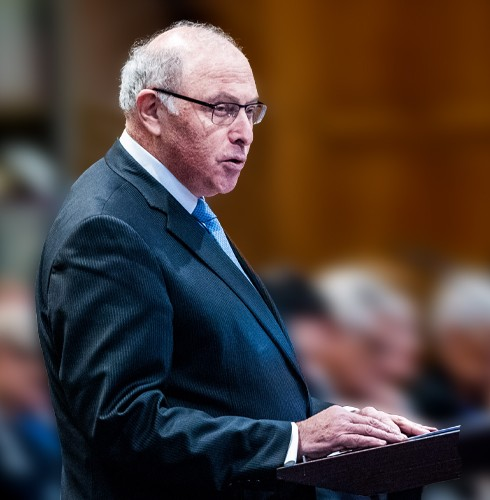
- Dean Grossman at AUWCL Tenley Campus

17th Dean of the Washington College of Law
- In office July 1995 – July 25, 2016
- Preceded by: Elliott Milstein
- Succeeded by: Camille A. Nelson

Personal details
- Born: November 26, 1947 (age 78) Valparaíso, Chile
- Spouse: Irene Klinger
- Education: University of Chile; University of Amsterdam

Claudio Mauricio Grossman Guiloff (born November 26, 1947) is a lawyer and law professor. From 1995 until the summer of 2016, he served as dean of the Washington College of Law of American University in Washington, D.C. He continues to teach at the Washington College of Law and serve as Dean Emeritus.

In November 2016, he was elected to the United Nations International Law Commission (ILC) for a five-year term. He was reelected to the ILC in 2021. In November 2021, he was also appointed Advisor without Portfolio to the Prosecutor of the International Criminal Court.

Grossman has also served as vice chair of the United Nations Committee Against Torture (2003–2008) and as Chairperson (2008–2015). He is a former member of the Inter-American Commission on Human Rights (1993–2001). He was twice elected its president, first in 1996 and again in 2001. He was the IACHR's first Special Rapporteur on the Rights of Women (1996–2000) and its Special Rapporteur on the Rights of Indigenous Populations (2000–2001).

== Early life and education ==
Grossman was born in Valparaíso, Chile. He is Jewish-Chilean. He attended the law school at the University of Chile in Santiago. He received his Licenciado en Ciencias Jurídicas y Sociales in March 1971, with a summa cum laude thesis "Nacionalización y Compensación," coauthored with Carlos Portales.

== Career ==
Grossman served as a lecturer in the University of Chile's Faculty of Law in 1972 and as a research fellow at the Instituto de Estudios Internacionales (Institute of International Studies) at the University of Chile in 1973.

From 1974 to 1980, Grossman was associate professor in international law at the Department of International Organizations of the Europa Institute of the Law School of the University of Utrecht in the Netherlands. In August 1980, Grossman earned the Doctor in de Rechtsgeleerdheid (Doctor of the Science of Law) at the University of Amsterdam. His thesis was Het Beginsel van Non-Interventie in de Organizatie van Amerikaanse Staten (The Principle of Non-Intervention in the Organization of American States).

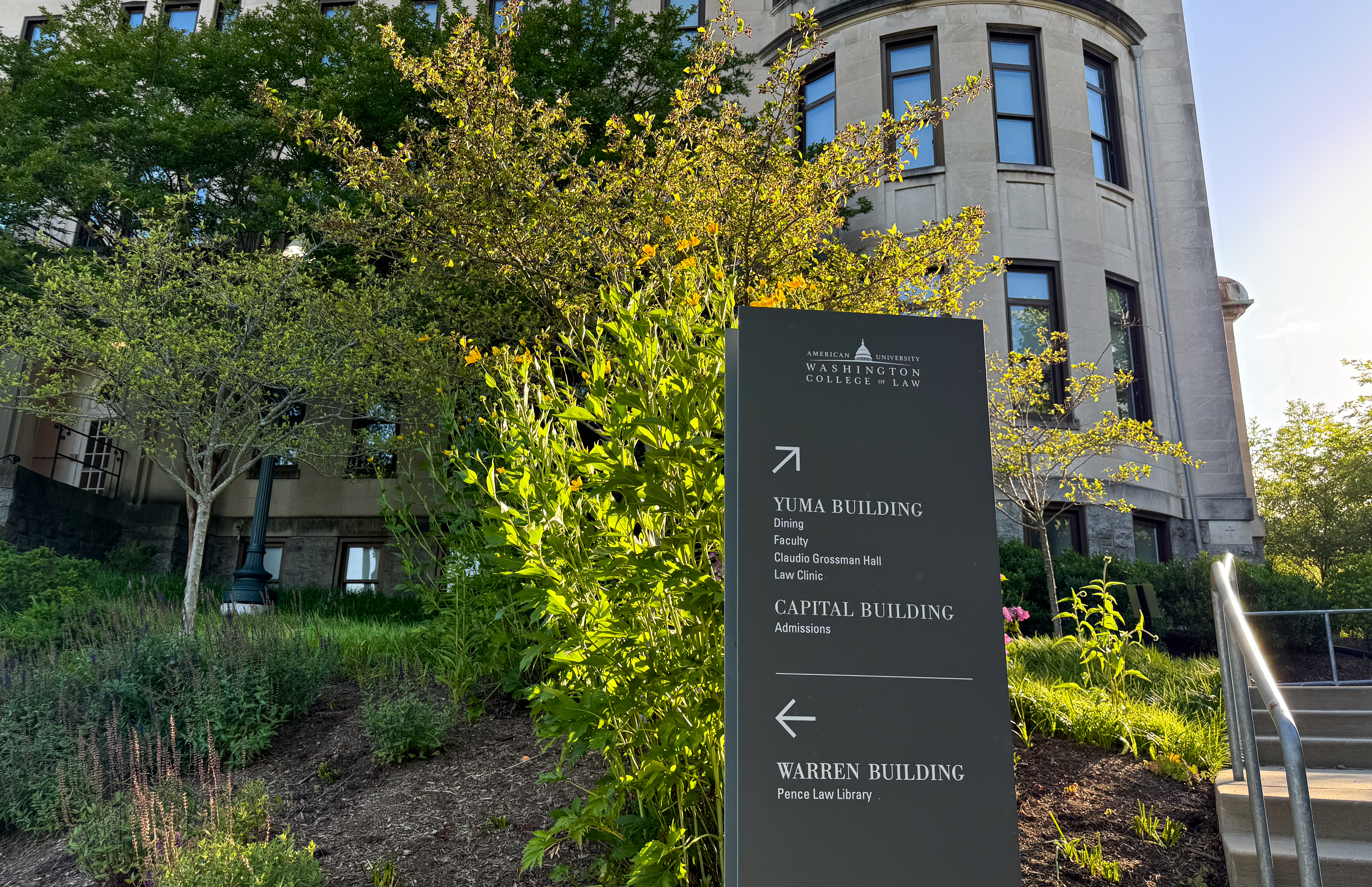
AUWCL signage to Yuma building, featuring Claudio Grossman Hall

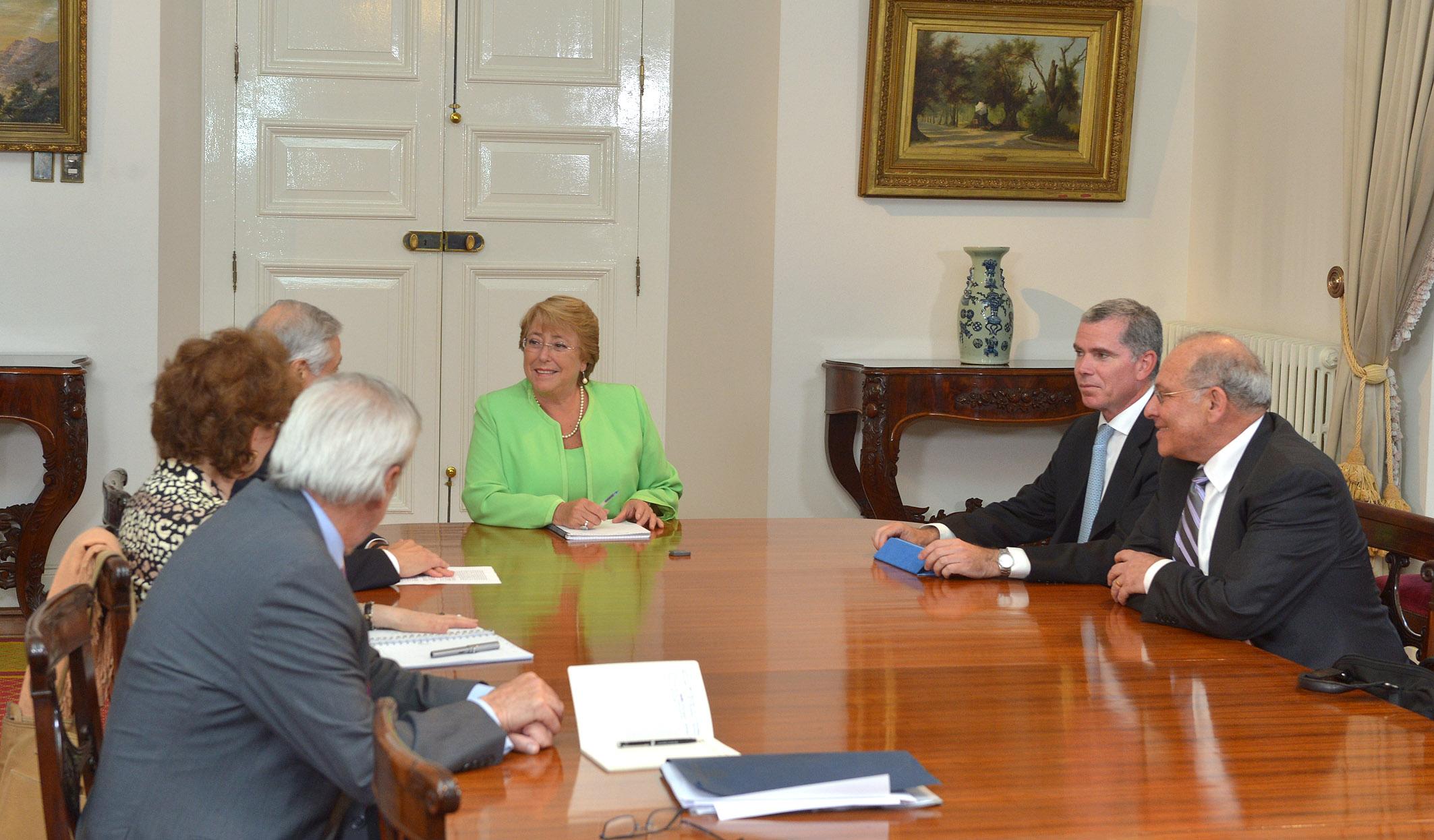
Grossman (on the right) at a meeting in La Moneda regarding the case between Bolivia and former President Evo Morales in The Hague.

From 1980 to 1983, Grossman was a professor in international law at the Department of Law, Universiteit Twente.

=== American University ===
In 1983, Grossman joined American University's Washington College of Law (AUWCL) as director of their International studies program. He became the dean in 1995. Grossman oversaw the hiring of 50 new faculty members and the construction of the Tenley campus. As dean, Grossman was recognized as one of the 25 most influential figures in legal education. Grossman stepped down as dean in 2015 and he is currently a faculty member at AUWCL.

He serves on the Advisory Council for the Crimes Against Humanity Initiative, a program from the Whitney R. Harris World Law Institute at Washington University School of Law in St. Louis, aimed at creating the first global treaty to prevent and punish crimes against humanity.

=== International Law Commission ===
In 2017, Grossman was appointed as a member of the International Law Commission, with his position being renewed in 2021 until 2027. He is a member of the study group on sea level rising.

In November 2021, he was appointed counsel without portfolio to the prosecutor of the International Criminal Court. His appointment faced criticism from civil society actors due to his alleged proximity to President Sebastián Piñera, especially at a time when the Prosecutor's Office was investigating communications denouncing the commission of crimes against humanity during the 2019 Chilean protests.

== Awards ==
- 2020, Goler T. Butcher Medal, for being a "distinguished person for outstanding contributions to the development or effective realization of international human rights."
- 2025, Nelson Mandela Award from the Association of American Law Schools
- March 2025, Premio Facultad de Derecho de la Escuela de Derecho de la Universidad de Chile
- Harry LeRoy Jones Award from the Washington Foreign Law Society
- René Cassin Award from B’nai B’rith International
