= Sonja McCullen =

American lawyer

Judge of the Hawaii Intermediate Court of Appeals
- Incumbent
- Assumed office October 1, 2021
- Appointed by: David Ige
- Preceded by: Derrick H. M. Chan

Personal details
- Education: University of Hawaiʻi at Mānoa (BA, JD)

Sonja McCullen is an American judge, lawyer and former educator who currently serves as a judge of the Hawaii Intermediate Court of Appeals.

== Education ==
McCullen earned a Bachelor of Arts degree in liberal and Hawaiian studies from the University of Hawaiʻi at Mānoa and a Juris Doctor from the William S. Richardson School of Law.

== Career ==
From 1994 to 1997, McCullen worked as a teacher at Waianae High School. For over 10 years, she has served as a deputy prosecutor in the appellate division of the Department of the Prosecuting Attorney of the City and County of Honolulu. She was also a staff attorney for United Public Workers of America. In August 2021, McCullen was nominated to serve as a judge of the Hawaii Intermediate Court of Appeals.

Legal offices
Preceded by Derrick H. M. Chan	Judge of the Hawaii Intermediate Court of Appeals; 2021–present	Incumbent
