= Paula A. Nakayama =

American judge (born 1953)

Justice of the Supreme Court of Hawaii
- In office April 22, 1993 – April 21, 2023
- Nominated by: John D. Waihee III
- Succeeded by: Vladimir Devens

Personal details
- Born: October 19, 1953 (age 72) Honolulu, Hawaii, U.S.
- Spouse: Charles W. Totto
- Children: 2
- Education: University of California, Davis (BA); Hastings College of Law (JD)

Paula Aiko Nakayama (born October 19, 1953) is an American lawyer who served as an associate justice of the Hawaii State Supreme Court from 1993 to 2023. After Rhoda V. Lewis, Nakayama is second woman to ever serve on the Hawaii State Supreme Court. She is also the first Asian American woman to serve as a state supreme court justice nationwide. Currently serving her third term, Nakayama served her first term from 1993 to 2003 and her second term from 2003 to 2013.

== Early life and education ==
Nakayama is the daughter of Harry Nakayama, a WWII veteran of the 442nd Regimental Combat Team, and Harriet Nakayama, who were both born and raised on Maui. At a young age, Nakayama moved to San Jose, California where she graduated from Blackford High School. She then went on to study at the University of California, Davis where she obtained her bachelor's degree in consumer economics. She obtained her doctorate of jurisprudence at the Hastings College of Law.

== Career ==
In 1979, Nakayama joined the staff of the Prosecuting Attorney of Honolulu as a deputy prosecutor. In 1982, she joined the law firm Shim, Tam, Sigal and Naito where she became a partner.

In 1992, Governor John D. Waiheʻe III appointed Nakayama to the Hawaii State Judiciary as a circuit court judge. Confident of her skill, the governor elevated Nakayama to the Hawaii Supreme Court in 1993 — the first woman on the court in 26 years. The Hawaii Judicial Selection Commission retained and reappointed Nakayama for a second term in 2003 and for a third term in 2013. She retired from active service on April 21, 2023.

Nakayama's notable written opinions include her 1996 opinion that ruled policyholders can sue insurance companies for acting in "bad faith" for delaying payment of claims, and her 2000 majority opinion rejecting part of the state water commission's landmark decision that divided Waiahole Ditch water between Windward and Leeward Oahu, which reaffirmed the state's commitment to the public trust doctrine "to protect, control and regulate the use of Hawai'i's water resources for the benefit of its people."

== Personal life ==
Nakayama is married to attorney Charles Totto, who formerly served as executive director of the Honolulu Ethics Commission.

== See also ==
- List of Asian American jurists
