= Todd W. Eddins =

American judge (born 1964 or 1965)

Todd Eddins

Associate Justice of the Hawaii Supreme Court
- Incumbent
- Assumed office December 11, 2020
- Appointed by: David Ige
- Preceded by: Richard W. Pollack

Personal details
- Born: March 18, 1964 (age 62) Fort Knox, Kentucky, U.S.
- Education: College of William and Mary (BBA); University of Hawaii, Manoa (JD)

Todd W. Eddins (born March 18, 1964) is an American lawyer who has served as an associate justice of the Hawaii Supreme Court since 2020. He previously served as a judge of the O'ahu First Circuit Court of Hawaii from 2017 to 2020.

== Education ==
Eddins received his Bachelor of Business Administration from the College of William & Mary in 1986 and he received his Juris Doctor from the William S. Richardson School of Law at the University of Hawaiʻi at Mānoa in 1991. While attending law school, Eddins was Executive Editor of the University of Hawaii Law Review.

== Legal career ==
After graduating law school, he served as a law clerk for Justice Yoshimi Hayashi of the Hawaiʻi Supreme Court. He later served as a deputy public defender from 1992 to 2004. He served in private practice from 2004 to 2010 and again from 2013 to 2017.

=== Notable Cases During Legal Career ===
During his time as a public defender and in private practice, Eddins was lead trial counsel in 125 jury trials.

==== Jack Law ====
In a 2006 sexual assault trial, Eddins successfully defended Jack Law, the owner of the world-renowned Hula's Bar & Lei Stand and a pillar in the local LGBTQ+ community. The jury acquitted Law in less than ten minutes, prompting Eddins to denounce what he called "the most outrageous, reprehensible prosecution in recent memory."

==== Billy Kenoi ====
Eddins represented then Hawai‘i County Mayor Billy Kenoi in 2016 who was charged with four counts of theft and one count of making a false statement under oath. Supporters in the courtroom cried when the jury found Kenoi not guilty. Eddins described the accusations as “flimsy” and “an odious attempt to take down a once-in-a-generation, good decent man.”

==== Alison Dadow ====
In 2016 Eddins represented Alison Dadow (also known as Alexandria Duval), who was accused of killing her twin sister by driving their car off the Hāna Highway in Maui. Dadow was released after a judge found there was no probable cause for the murder charge. Eddins agreed that it "was a tragic accident. It was not a homicide, it was not a crime. This judge understood the evidence and we’re just grateful that he got it."

==== State v. Aiwohi ====
Eddins won a landmark victory at the Hawai‘i Supreme Court in State v. Aiwohi (2005). The State charged Tayshea Aiwohi with manslaughter because she smoked methamphetamine while pregnant and her son died shortly after birth. Eddins defended Aiwohi and argued that a mother could not be prosecuted for conduct that harmed a fetus because a fetus was not a person. Eddins warned that if a mother can be prosecuted for conduct toward a fetus, then a mother could be criminally charged for caffeine or tobacco use while pregnant. The court agreed with Eddins, holding that under Hawai‘i law, a person is a "human who has been born and is alive." The high-profile case examined the ethical, scientific, and public policy issues that arose from the co-occurrence of pregnancy and drug dependency.

==== Community Association ====
In 1977 the state bought hundreds of acres in Waiahole Valley to prevent the land from being developed into a housing subdivision. The state promised to keep the land in agriculture use. In 1988, leases were handed out to families who lived and farmed there. In 2004, Eddins represented the Waiāhole-Waikāne Community Association as the state threatened to evict residents who failed to meet the terms of the state lease. For some families, their only violation was failing to build on the land, and the state required them to post a bond worth 100% of the cost of constructing a house. The residents had been trying to build a house on the land, but had been unable to secure the loan they required to do so, as they had not been allowed to buy the leasehold interest. At the time, Governor Linda Lingle's administration wanted to turn over management of the valleys to the Department of Hawaiian Home Lands. The association members unanimously opposed the proposed transfer. Ultimately, the legislature passed a resolution opposing the transfer and it did not occur.

== Judicial career ==
=== Circuit Court (2017-2020) ===
On February 9, 2017, Governor David Ige appointed Eddins to be a Circuit Judge of the First Circuit Court to fill the vacancy left by the retirement of Judge Richard K. Perkins in June 2016. Eddins became a Circuit Judge on April 7, 2017. His service on the Circuit Court terminated when he was sworn in as an associate justice of the Hawaiʻi Supreme Court. Known as a workhorse, Eddins presided over 85 jury trials and 21 jury-waived trials during his three years as a Circuit Court judge.

==== State v. Char ====
In 2016, Mark Char was found guilty of three counts of attempted murder for a triple stabbing on a freeway during a road rage incident. The relatively straightforward case drew national attention when Char wore blackface to his sentencing in 2019. Char, who is not black, decried what he called "this kangaroo court" for giving him a life sentence for what he characterized as self defense, "in essence treating me like a black man", he said, "I prepared myself to play my part in your kangaroo court [...] so today I’m going to be a black man." Eddins quickly rebuked Char, "If you look in the mirror, Mr. Char, you’re not gonna see a black person. You’re gonna see a menace. You’re a menace to society." Eddins sentenced Char to life in prison with the possibility of parole.

==== Isaiah McCoy ====
Isaiah McCoy, a death row exoneree, was charged with second-degree robbery in 2019. McCoy, out on bail awaiting trial, was arrested at Daniel K. Inouye International Airport after trying to get through security without proper identification. During a hearing on the State's request to deny bail, Eddins gave McCoy several warnings after McCoy raised his voice and “made questionable statements.” McCoy yelled at Eddins, “Dude, make your ruling and I’m going to fight it,” and "You’re a loser, just like everybody else." Eddins finally had a deputy sheriff remove McCoy, after which McCoy accused him of racism. He continued yelling “You’re a racist” as he was dragged out of court.

=== Hawaiʻi Supreme Court ===
On September 29, 2020, Governor David Ige's office announced Eddins was one of three candidates being considered for appointment to the Hawaii Supreme Court. On October 23, 2020, Governor David Ige announced Eddins as his appointment to the Hawaii Supreme Court to fill the vacancy left by the retirement of Richard W. Pollack. On November 19, 2020, he was confirmed in the Hawaii Senate by a vote of 25–0. He was sworn in on December 11, 2020.

In 2026, Eddins wrote an acerbic opinion asserting the sovereignty of the Hawaii Constitution and the Hawaii Supreme Court's authority to interpret it separately from the Supreme Court's interpretation of the United States Constitution. He accused the Roberts Court of seeing only "white" and dismantling the Voting Rights Act.

Legal offices
Preceded by Richard W. Pollack	Associate Justice of the Hawaii Supreme Court; 2020–present	Incumbent
