= Mari Matsuda =

American lawyer

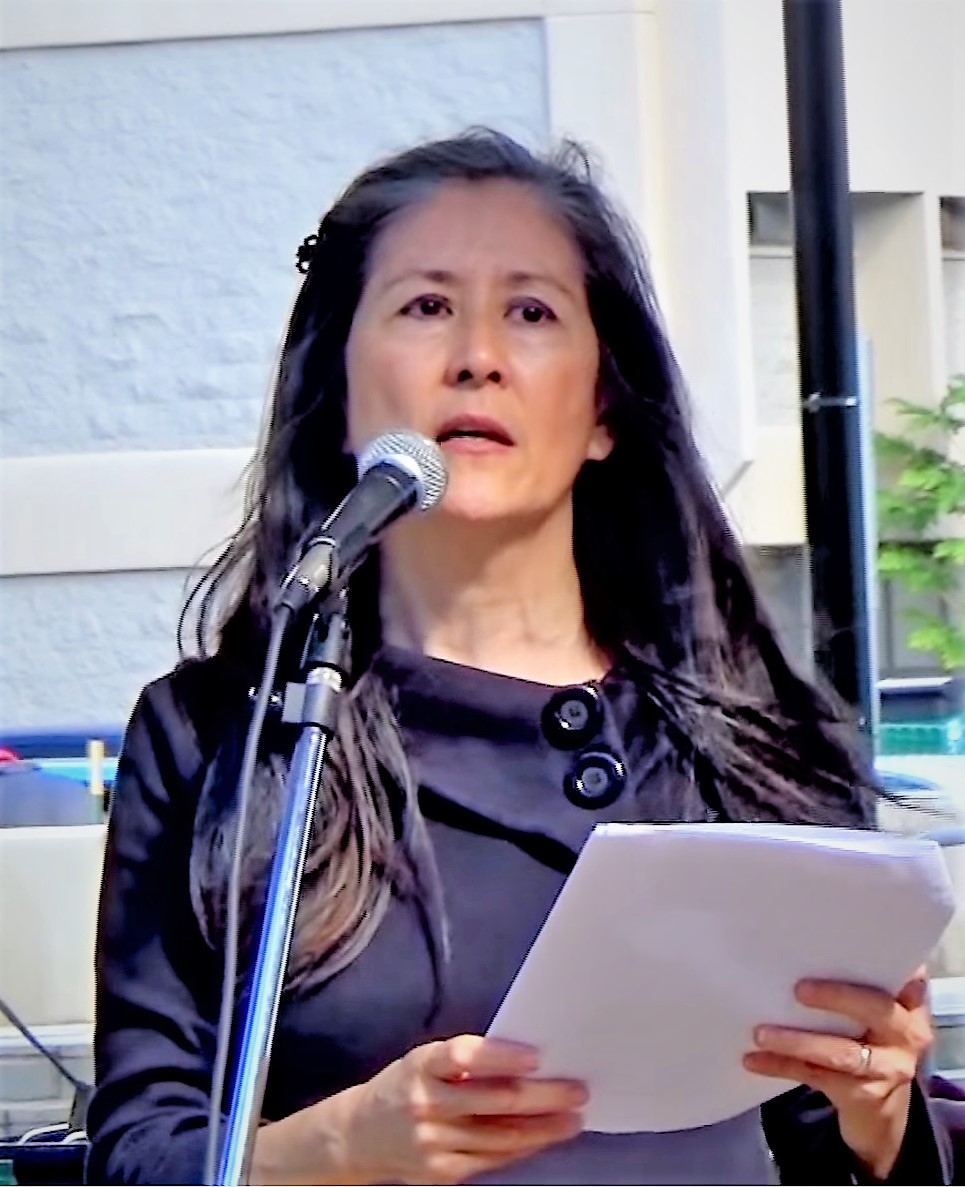
Matsuda at a 2016 Teach-In

Mari J. Matsuda (born 1956) is an American lawyer, activist, and law professor at the William S. Richardson School of Law at the University of Hawaiʻi at Mānoa. She was the first tenured female Asian American law professor in the United States, at University of California, Los Angeles (UCLA) School of Law in 1998 and one of the leading voices in critical race theory since its inception. Matsuda returned to Richardson in the fall of 2008. Prior to her return, Matsuda was a professor at the UCLA School of Law and Georgetown University Law Center, specializing in the fields of torts, constitutional law, legal history, feminist theory, critical race theory, and civil rights law.

== Education and early career ==
Matsuda obtained her high school diploma from Roosevelt High School in Hawaii, Bachelor of Arts from Arizona State University, her Juris Doctor from the William S. Richardson School of Law at the University of Hawaiʻi at Mānoa, and her LL.M., Harvard Law School. She was an associate at the labor law firm of King & Nakamura in Honolulu and was law clerk to Judge Herbert Young Cho Choy of the Ninth Circuit Court of Appeals.

== Career ==
She became the first tenured female Asian American law professor in the United States, at University of California, Los Angeles (UCLA) School of Law in 1998. Before joining the faculty at UCLA, she was professor of law for eight years at the University of Hawaii School of Law, teaching American Legal History, Torts, Constitutional Law, Civil Rights, and Sex Discrimination. Professor Matsuda has also taught at Stanford Law School and Hiroshima University and served as a judicial training consultant in Micronesia and South Africa. She is a self-described "activist scholar." Her intellectual influence extends beyond law reviews (she authored three entries on a Yale Law School librarian's list of the ten most-cited law review articles) to include articles in academic and popular journals such as Amerasia Journal and Ms. Magazine. She is one of the leading voices in critical race theory since its inception. For example, she wrote in 1996 regarding the importance of Asian-Americans fighting becoming the racial bourgeoisie. Her publications on reparations and affirmative action are frequently cited.

As a frequent keynote speaker, she has lectured at universities. As a board member of the Chevron-Texaco Task Force on Equality and Fairness, she coauthored its final report in 2002, and she received the 2003 Society of American Law Teachers Human Rights Award at the Association of American Law Schools Conference.

She has served as a judicial training consultant in countries as diverse as Micronesia and South Africa, and her work has been cited in state supreme court opinions. For Matsuda, community is linked to teaching and scholarship. She serves on national advisory boards of social justice organizations, including the ACLU, the National Asian Pacific Legal Consortium, and Ms. Magazine. She was recognized by A. Magazine as one of the 100 most influential Asian Americans for her representation of Manuel Fragante accent discrimination case, and others. Judge Richard Posner lists Mari Matsuda as among those scholars most likely to have lasting influence.

== Awards and honors ==
- AALDEF Justice in Action award, 2014
- Regents Medal for Excellence in Teaching, 2016

== Selected bibliography ==
=== Books ===
- Matsuda, Mari; Lawrence, III, Charles R. (1997). We Won't Go Back: Making the Case for Affirmative Action. Houghton Mifflin. ISBN 9780395791257.
- Matsuda, Mari J. (1996). Where Is Your Body? And Other Essays on Race, Gender and Law. Beacon Press. ISBN 9780807067802.
- Matsuda, Mari J.; Lawrence, III, Charles R. (1993). Words That Wound: Critical Race Theory, Assaultive Speech, and the First Amendment. Westview Press. ISBN 9780813384283.
- Matsuda, Mari J. (1992). Called From Within: Early Women Lawyers of Hawaii. University of Hawaii Press. ISBN 9780824814489.

=== Book chapters ===
- Matsuda, Mari J. (2002). "Beyond and Not Beyond, Black and White: Deconstruction Has a Politics". In Francisco Valdes; et al. (eds.). Crossroads, Directions, and a New Critical Race Theory 393. Temple U. Press. ISBN 9781566399302.
- Matsuda, Mari J. "Civil Society". In Virginia Hodgkinson; Mark Warren (eds.). Essays on Civil Society.
- Matsuda, Mar J. (1994). "Law and Culture in the District Court of Honolulu, 1844-1845: A Case Study of the Rise of Legal Consciousness". In Charles McClain (ed.). 2 Asian Indians, Filipinos, Other Asian Communities, and the Law 190. Garland Pub.
- Matsuda, Mari J. (1992). "Harriet Bouslog". In Mari J. Matsuda (ed.). Called From Within: Early Women Lawyers of Hawaii 148. University of Hawaii Press.

=== Journal articles ===
- "Who is Excellent," 1 Seattle J. Soc. Just. 29 (2003).
- "I and Thou and We and the Way to Peace," Issues Legal Scholarship (August 2002), available at http://www.bepress.com/ils/iss2/art6.
- "What Would It Take to Feel Safe?," 27 N.Y.U. Rev. L. & Soc. Change 78 (2001/2002).
- "Asian Americans and the Peace Initiative," 27/28 Amerasia J. 141 (2001/2002).
- Et al., "Symposium: Building a Multiracial Social Justice Movement, Questions from the Audience," 27 N.Y.U. Rev. L. & Soc. Change 82 (2001/2002).
- "Planet Asian America," 8 Asian L.J. 169 (2001).
- "Foreword: Homophobia as Terrorism," 1 Geo. J. Gender & L. 1 (1999).
- "McCarthyism, the Internment and the Contradictions of Power," 40 B.C. L. Rev. 9 (1999).
- "Opinion: Guilt by Admissions," Ms., June/July 1999, at 29 (discussing feminism and affirmative action).
- "Crime and Affirmative Action," 1 J. Gender Race & Just. 309 (1998).
- "Were You There? Witnessing Welfare Retreat (In Memory of Professor Trina Grillo)," 31 U.S.F. L. Rev. 779 (1997).
- "Merit Badges for the Revolution," Ms., Aug./Sep. 1997, at 94.
- "Is Hawaii America's Tomorrow?," Address at Harvard University, Holoimua, Hawaii (1997).
- "The Keynote Address: Progressive Civil Liberties," 3 Temple Pol. & Civ. Rts. L. Rev. 9 (1993-1994).
- "We Will Not Be Used," UCLA Asian Am. Pacific Islands LJ, now known as: UCLA Asian Pac. Am. LJ (1993).
- "When the First Quail Calls: Multiple Consciousness as Jurisprudential Method," 14 Women's Rts. L. Rep. 297 (1992).
- "Besides My Sister, Facing the Enemy: Legal Theory Out of Coalition," 43 Stan. L. Rev. 1183 (1991).
- "Voices of America: Accent, Antidiscrimination Law and Jurisprudence for the Last Reconstruction," 100 Yale L.J. 1329 (1991)
- "Public Response for Racist Speech: Considering the Victim's Story," 87 Mich. L. Rev. 2320 (1989)
- "Looking to the Bottom: Critical Legal Studies and Reparations," 22 Harvard Civil Rights-Civil Liberties L. Rev. 323 (1987)

== Personal life ==
She is of Okinawan ancestry.
