= Clyde J. Wadsworth =

American judge

Judge of the Hawaii Intermediate Court of Appeals
- Incumbent
- Assumed office October 21, 2019
- Appointed by: David Ige
- Preceded by: Lawrence M. Reifurth

Personal details
- Born: March 8, 1958 (age 68) Roswell, New Mexico
- Education: Princeton University; UCLA School of Law (J.D.)

Clyde J. Wadsworth is a Judge of the Hawaii Intermediate Court of Appeals.

== Education ==
Wadsworth received his bachelor's degree magna cum laude from Princeton University. He earned his Juris Doctor from the UCLA School of Law, where he served as an editor of the UCLA Law Review.

== Legal career ==
Wadsworth was of counsel to Alston Hunt Floyd & Ing in Honolulu. From January 2017 to October 2019, Wadsworth served as the Solicitor General of Hawaii. In 2014, he was counsel for an amicus curiae supporting marriage equality in Hawaii's marriage equality case, Jackson v. Abercrombie, before the United States Court of Appeals for the Ninth Circuit.

== Service on the Hawaii Intermediate Court of Appeals ==
Wadsworth was one of six applicants being considered for a vacancy. On August 28, 2019, Governor David Ige announced the appointment of Wadsworth to the Hawaii Intermediate Court of Appeals to fill the seat left vacant by the retirement of Judge Lawrence M. Reifurth in August 2019. On September 16, 2019, he had a hearing before the Judiciary Committee of the Hawaii Senate. His nomination was confirmed by the Senate on September 17, 2019. He was sworn into office on October 21, 2019, and ceremoniously sworn in on November 12, 2019.

Legal offices
Preceded by Lawrence M. Reifurth	Judge of the Hawaii Intermediate Court of Appeals; 2019–present	Incumbent
