= Richard W. Pollack =

American judge

Associate Justice of the Supreme Court of Hawaii
- In office August 6, 2012 – July 2, 2020
- Nominated by: Neil Abercrombie
- Preceded by: James E. Duffy, Jr.
- Succeeded by: Todd W. Eddins

Personal details
- Born: July 2, 1950 (age 76)
- Education: University of California, Santa Barbara; Hastings College of Law

Richard W. Pollack (born July 2, 1950) is a former Associate Justice of the Supreme Court of Hawaii. He was nominated by Governor Neil Abercrombie in 2012 to replace outgoing Justice James E. Duffy, Jr. His nomination was approved in the Hawaii State Senate by a vote of 24–1, and he was appointed on August 6, 2012. He retired on July 2, 2020, when he reached the mandatory retirement age of 70.

== Legal career ==
Pollack attended the University of California, Santa Barbara and University of California, Hastings College of the Law, receiving his Bachelor of Arts degree with honors and his Juris Doctor (1976), respectively. After passing the Hawaii Bar Exam, he became a Deputy Public Defender, serving for seven years. In 1987, he became the State Public Defender, serving for thirteen years until he was appointed as a Judge on the Oahu First Circuit of the Hawaii State Circuit Courts. He is also a lecturer at the William S. Richardson School of Law at the University of Hawaiʻi at Mānoa, where he teaches Evidence and Criminal Procedure.

Legal offices
Preceded by James E. Duffy, Jr.	Associate Justice of the Supreme Court of Hawaii; 2012–2020	Succeeded by Todd W. Eddins
