= Vladimir Devens =

Chief Justice of the Hawaii Supreme Court

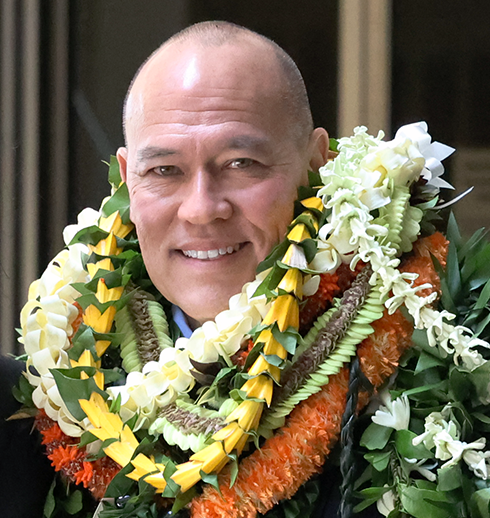

Chief Justice of the Hawaii Supreme Court
- Incumbent
- Assumed office May 5, 2026
- Appointed by: Josh Green
- Preceded by: Sabrina McKenna (acting)

Associate Justice of the Hawaii Supreme Court
- In office January 12, 2024 – May 4, 2026
- Appointed by: Josh Green
- Preceded by: Paula A. Nakayama
- Succeeded by: Vacant

Personal details
- Born: Vladimir Paul Devens; 1962 (age 63–64) Honolulu, Hawaii, U.S.
- Education: University of California, Berkeley (BA, JD)

Vladimir Paul Devens (born 1962) is the chief justice of the Hawaii Supreme Court. Prior to his appointment as chief justice, Devens was a private practice lawyer and an associate justice of the Hawaii Supreme Court.

== Early life and education ==
Devens' father was a managing director for Honolulu Mayor Frank Fasi and his mother Setsuko Sugihara was a piano teacher. Vladimir P. Devens is of mixed Japanese-American Heritage. He was born in Honolulu, and graduated from Kalani High School in 1980. He earned a Bachelor of Arts degree, magna cum laude from the University of California, Berkeley in 1984 and a Juris Doctor from the UC Berkeley School of Law in 1987.

== Career ==
Devens was principal at the Law Offices of Vladimir P. Devens, LLC and had been a partner at Meheula, Devens & Winer, as well as at Meheula & Devens. In 2013, he served on the Governor's Hawaii Impaired Driving Task Force and as chair and vice chair of the State Land Use Commission. Devens served as lead counsel in the Hawaii Supreme Court's landmark child abuse decision in Kahoohanohano v. DHS. He was also a police officer with the Honolulu Police Department for six years.

=== Hawaii Supreme Court ===
==== Associate Justice ====
Devens was one of six candidates submitted by the Hawaii Judicial Selection Commission to the governor. On October 23, 2023, Governor Josh Green announced Devens as a nominee to serve as an associate justice of the Hawaii Supreme Court. On November 1, 2023, the governor sent a letter to the Senate, clarifying that Devens was nominated to the seat vacated by Justice Paula A. Nakayama who retired on April 21, 2023. A hearing on his nomination was held on November 17, 2023. On November 21, 2023, Devens was confirmed in the Hawaii Senate by a unanimous 21–0 vote. He was sworn into office on January 12, 2024.

==== Chief Justice ====
Devens was one of five candidates submitted by the Hawaii Judicial Selection Commission to the governor. On April 2, 2026, Governor Josh Green announced Devens as a nominee to serve as the Chief Justice of the Hawaii Supreme Court. On the same day, the governor sent a letter to the Senate, clarifying that Devens was nominated to the seat vacated by Chief Justice Mark E. Recktenwald who retired on September 30, 2025. A hearing on his nomination was held on April 22, 2026.

===== Application Scandal =====
An article in Civil Beat was published on April 20, 2026 which detailed that legislators were "concerned Devens did not disclose in his confidential Judicial Selection Commission application last week that he spent four years on the board of Be Change Now, the super PAC operated by Pacific Resource Partnership, which represents the Hawaii Regional Council of Carpenters and more than 250 of Hawaiʻi’s top contractors."

During the hearing on April 22nd, senators in the Committee on Judiciary spent nearly two hours grilling Devens on the issues in the article. The Committee deferred their decision until April 24th, when they recommended the Senate consent to the nomination with a 3-2 vote. Most notably, long-time Chair of the Committee on Judiciary, Karl Rhoads, voted against Devens' nomination.

On April 30, 2026, Devens was confirmed by the Hawaii Senate with 20 Ayes (6 Ayes with Reservations), and 5 Noes.

Legal offices
Preceded by Paula A. Nakayama	Associate Justice of the Hawaii Supreme Court; 2024–2026	Vacant
Preceded by Sabrina McKenna; Acting	Chief Justice of the Hawaii Supreme Court; 2026–resent	Incumbent
