= Mark E. Recktenwald =

American judge (born 1955)

Mark Recktenwald
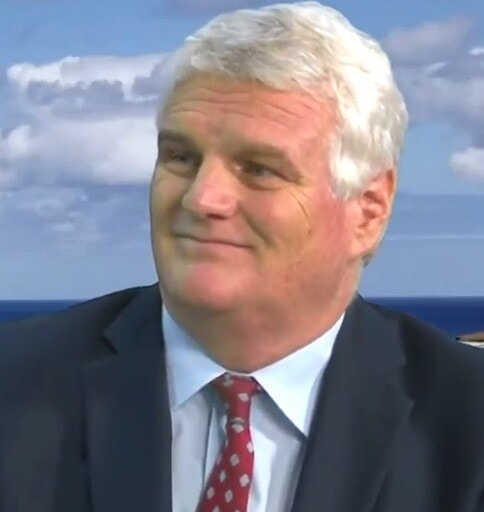

Chief Justice of the Hawaii Supreme Court
- In office September 14, 2010 – September 30, 2025
- Appointed by: Linda Lingle
- Preceded by: Ronald Moon
- Succeeded by: Sabrina McKenna (acting)

Associate Justice of the Hawaii Supreme Court
- In office May 5, 2009 – September 14, 2010
- Appointed by: Linda Lingle
- Preceded by: Steven Levinson
- Succeeded by: Sabrina McKenna

Personal details
- Born: October 8, 1955 (age 70) Detroit, Michigan, U.S.
- Children: 2
- Education: Harvard University (BA); University of Chicago (JD)

Mark E. Recktenwald (born October 8, 1955) is an American lawyer who served as the chief justice of the Supreme Court of Hawaii from 2010 to 2025.

== Background ==
Recktenwald was born to Bill Recktenwald, a patent attorney, and Connie Recktenwald, a high school English teacher. He grew up in Lake Forest, Illinois, and attended public school there until he transferred to Deerfield Academy in Deerfield, Massachusetts. After graduating from Deerfield in 1978, he then went to Harvard University, where he graduated with honors. He wrote a thesis for his degree in anthropology titled "State and Economy in Moche III-IV Society". After graduating, he worked on Congressman John Anderson's presidential campaign. Anderson lost to Ronald Reagan in the primary, but then ran as an independent. He came to Hawaii in 1980 to advance a visit for Anderson's running mate, Wisconsin Governor Patrick Lucey. It was on this visit where he met his wife Gailynn Mahoe Williamson, who was a philosophy professor at Leeward Community College. He returned after the campaign ended for a vacation, but ended up staying and working for Sen. Ann Kobayashi. Recktenwald married Williamson in 1985. They have a son Andrew born c. 1989 and daughter Sarah born c. 1992, who are both lawyers. Recktenwald also has a stepson through his wife. Recktenwald worked as a reporter in the United Press International’s Honolulu Bureau. He graduated from the University of Chicago Law School in 1986. He published a paper on employment discrimination cases.

== Career ==
After law school, Recktenwald became a clerk for judge Harold Michael Fong of the United States District Court for the District of Hawaii until 1987. He then became an associate with Goodsill Anderson Quinn and Stifel in 1988. In 1991 he became assistant United States attorney, litigating both civil and criminal cases. He served as the health care fraud coordinator and environmental law enforcement coordinator for the U.S. Attorney’s Office, and was a prosecutor in other types of cases. In 1997 he became partner with the law firm of Marr Hipp Jones and Pepper specializing in employment litigation. In 1999 he returned to the U.S. Attorney’s Office. He became director of the Hawaii state Department of Commerce and Consumer Affairs (DCCA) in 2003.

=== Judicial service ===
In May 2007 he was appointed chief judge of the Hawaii Intermediate Court of Appeals. He participated in more than 250 cases and authored 10 published opinions. In February 2009 (confirmed in May 2009) he replaced retired Associate Justice Steven H. Levinson on the Supreme Court of Hawaii. On August 13, 2010, Recktenwald was nominated for chief justice by Hawaii Governor Linda Lingle. He was retained for a second term as Chief Justice and sworn in by Justice Paula A. Nakayama on September 11, 2020.

Recktenwald retired as Chief Justice on September 30, 2025 due to the Hawaii State Constitution's requirement that justices retire at the age of 70.

Legal offices
| Preceded by Steven Levinson | Associate Justice of the Hawaii Supreme Court; 2009–2010 | Succeeded by Sabrina McKenna |
| Preceded by Ronald Moon | Chief Justice of the Hawaii Supreme Court; 2010–2025 | Succeeded by Sabrina McKenna; Acting |
