= Simeon R. Acoba Jr. =

American judge (born 1944)

Associate Justice of the Hawaii Supreme Court
- In office May 19, 2000 – February 29, 2014
- Appointed by: George Ariyoshi

Personal details
- Born: March 11, 1944 (age 82) Honolulu, Hawaii
- Education: University of Hawaii at Manoa
- Occupation: Associate Justice of the Hawaii State Supreme Court

Simeon Rivera Acoba Jr. (born March 11, 1944, in Honolulu, Hawaii) was an Associate Justice of the Hawaii State Supreme Court. Acoba served his first term from May 19, 2000, to May 18, 2010, and was retained by the Judicial Selection Commission to serve a second ten-year term from May 19, 2010, to May 18, 2020. He retired from the court effective February 29, 2014.

Acoba graduated from Farrington High School in 1962. He later attended the University of Hawaii at Manoa. After earning his bachelor's degree at the University of Hawaii, Acoba attended law school at the Northwestern University School of Law, earning a Juris Doctor degree there in 1969.

In 1969, Acoba returned to Honolulu to become a law clerk for Hawaii State Supreme Court Chief Justice William S. Richardson. In 1970, he left this position to become a special assistant to University of Hawaii President Harlan Cleveland. In 1979, Acoba became a district court judge. In 1980, Governor George Ariyoshi appointed Acoba to the Hawaii State Judiciary as a circuit court judge. Governor John Waihee elevated Acoba in 1994 to the Hawaii State Intermediate Court of Appeals, the second highest court. Later, Governor Benjamin J. Cayetano appointed Acoba to the Hawaii State Supreme Court. Acoba was sworn in on May 19, 2000.
