= Lisa M. Ginoza =

American judge

Lisa Ginoza

Associate Justice of the Hawaii Supreme Court
- Incumbent
- Assumed office January 12, 2024
- Appointed by: Josh Green
- Preceded by: Michael D. Wilson

Personal details
- Education: Oregon State University (BA); University of Hawaii, Manoa (JD)

Lisa Miyoko Ginoza is an American lawyer from Hawaii who has served as an associate justice of the Supreme Court of Hawaii since 2024. She previously served as the chief judge of the Hawaii Intermediate Court of Appeals from 2018 to 2024.

== Education ==
Ginoza received her bachelor's degree from Oregon State University, and her Juris Doctor from the William S. Richardson School of Law at the University of Hawaii.

== Career ==
Ginoza served as a law clerk to the Judge Samuel Pailthorpe King of the United States District Court for the District of Hawaii. In 1990 she entered private practice with the law firm of McCorriston Miller Mukai MacKinnon, where she became a partner and over the course of fourteen years had an extensive civil litigation practice. From January 2005 until her appointment to the bench she served as first deputy attorney general for the State of Hawaii. Ginoza has also served as an adjunct professor in appellate advocacy at the William S. Richardson School of Law at the University of Hawaii.

=== Hawaii Intermediate Court of Appeals ===
Ginoza was first nominated to the court by Republican Governor Linda Lingle in February 2010, and her nomination was confirmed by the Hawaii Senate on March 5, 2010. Her 10-year term would have expired on May 6, 2020.

She was appointed chief judge of the court by Democratic Governor David Ige in March 2018. She was confirmed by the Hawaii Senate on April 4, 2018. She was sworn in as Chief Judge of the Intermediate Court of Appeals on April 24, 2018.

=== Supreme Court of Hawaii ===
On October 23, 2023, Ginoza was nominated by Governor Josh Green to a seat on the Supreme Court of Hawaii. On November 1, 2023, the governor sent a letter to the Senate, clarifying that Ginoza was nominated to the seat vacated by Justice Michael D. Wilson who retired on March 31, 2023. A hearing on her nomination was held on November 17, 2023. On November 21, 2023, Ginoza was confirmed in the Hawaii Senate by a unanimous 21–0 vote. She was sworn into office on January 12, 2024.

== See also ==
- List of Asian American jurists

Legal offices
Preceded by Michael D. Wilson	Associate Justice of the Hawaii Supreme Court; 2024–present	Incumbent
