= Yoshimi Hayashi =

American judge (1923–2006)

Justice of the Supreme Court of Hawaii
- In office March 30, 1982 – March 31, 1992

Personal details
- Born: November 2, 1922 Honolulu, Hawaii
- Died: April 23, 2006 (aged 83)

Yoshimi Hayashi (Japanese: 林 義美, November 2, 1922 – April 23, 2006) was a justice of the Supreme Court of Hawaii from March 30, 1982 to March 31, 1992. He was the first person to serve at all four levels of state courts and the first Japanese-American U.S. attorney.

== Early life ==
Born in Honolulu, Hayashi was raised by various family members after his mother died when he was four, and his father was away working as a carpenter. Hayashi graduated from President William McKinley High School in 1941, and after enrolling at the University of Hawaiʻi, left to serve in the United States Army during World War II. He returned to civilian life in Hawaii in 1946, where he was nearly killed in Hilo, Hawaii, in the tsunami following the 1946 Aleutian Islands earthquake.

== Career ==
Hayashi received a Bachelor's degree from University of Hawaii, followed by a Juris Doctor from the George Washington University Law School in 1958. In 1961, he became an assistant U.S. Attorney for the District of Hawaii, and was the United States Attorney for that district from 1967 to 1970. Hayashi was appointed as a judge to consecutively higher state courts from 1970 to 1982, when Governor George Ariyoshi appointed Hayashi to a seat on the state supreme court, where Hayashi remained until his retirement in 1992.

== Death ==
Hayashi died on April 23, 2006.

Political offices
Preceded by Thomas Shoichi Ogata	Justice of the Supreme Court of Hawaii; 1982–1992	Succeeded by Robert G. Klein
