= Kenji M. Price =

American lawyer (born 1980)

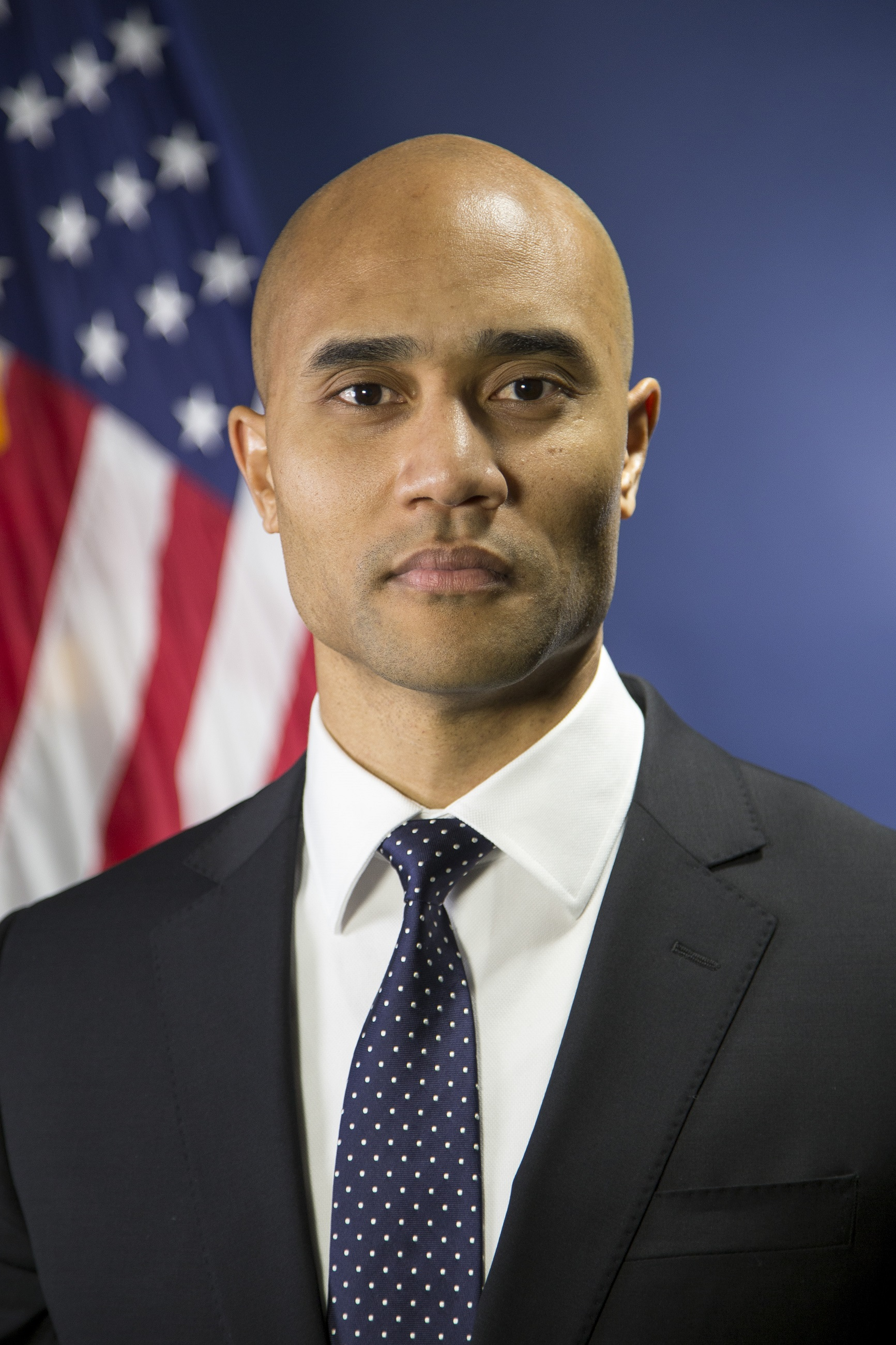

United States Attorney for the District of Hawaii
- In office January 5, 2018 – February 21, 2021
- President: Donald Trump; Joe Biden
- Preceded by: Florence T. Nakakuni
- Succeeded by: Clare E. Connors

Personal details
- Born: 1980 (age 45–46) Port Jervis, New York, U.S.
- Education: Gonzaga University; University of Pennsylvania Law School, (J.D.)

Kenji Marcel Price (born 1980) is an American lawyer who has served as the United States Attorney for the District of Hawaii from 2018 to 2021.

Price completed his undergraduate studies at Gonzaga University, and earned a Juris Doctor from the University of Pennsylvania Law School, where he served as editor-in-chief of the University of Pennsylvania Law Review. He also served as an officer in the United States Army for approximately four years, during which time he served as a member of the 75th Ranger Regiment and the 173rd Airborne Brigade.

Price has clerked for Judge Kent A. Jordan of the United States Court of Appeals for the Third Circuit and Judge Robert B. Kugler of the United States District Court for the District of New Jersey.

Before joining private practice, Price served as an Assistant United States Attorney in the Eastern District of New York. He then was a partner and of counsel at Carlsmith Ball in Honolulu. He was previously a director at Alston Hunt Floyd & Ing, where his practice focused on white-collar criminal defense and commercial litigation.

On April 26, 2018, the Senate confirmed Price by voice vote. He was sworn into office on May 1, 2018.

On February 16, 2021, Price submitted his resignation effective February 21, 2021.

On October 1, 2024, Price assumed his role as Senior Vice President and General Counsel at Hawaiʻi Pacific University.
