= Sabrina McKenna =

American judge (born 1957)

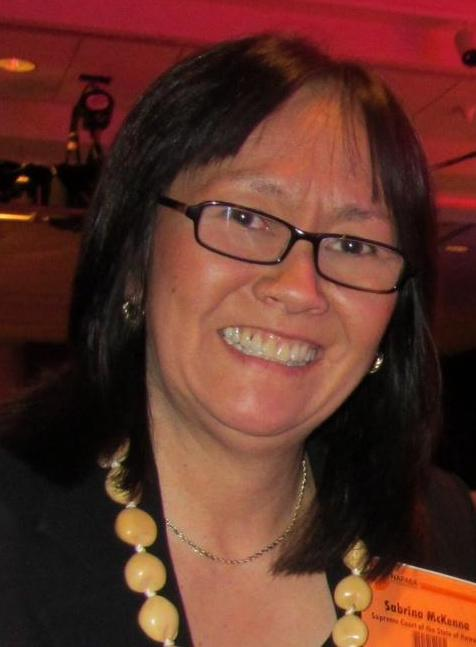
- McKenna in 2012

Associate Justice of the Hawaii Supreme Court
- Incumbent
- Assumed office March 3, 2011
- Appointed by: Neil Abercrombie
- Preceded by: Mark E. Recktenwald

Chief Justice of the Hawaii Supreme Court
- Acting
- In office October 1, 2025 – May 5, 2026
- Preceded by: Mark E. Recktenwald
- Succeeded by: Vladimir Devens

Personal details
- Born: October 7, 1957 (age 69) Tokyo, Japan
- Domestic partner: Denise Yamashiro
- Children: 3
- Education: University of Hawaii, Manoa (BA, JD); Duke University (LLM)

Sabrina Shizue McKenna (born October 7, 1957) is an American judge from the U.S. state of Hawaii. Since March 3, 2011, she has served as a justice of the Supreme Court of Hawaii.

== Early life and education ==
McKenna was born on October 7, 1957, in Tokyo, Japan. Her father was a professor from the Midwestern United States and her mother was a Japanese national. McKenna's father died when she was 9 years old. McKenna graduated from Yokota High School in Tokyo.

McKenna attended the University of Hawaiʻi at Mānoa, where she played on the Hawaii Rainbow Wahine women's basketball team. She was one of the first beneficiaries of Title IX. She graduated with a Bachelor of Arts in Japanese. McKenna then earned her Juris Doctor from the William S. Richardson School of Law.

== Career ==
McKenna was an associate at Goodsill Anderson Quinn & Stifel until 1987, then served as general counsel to Otaka, Inc. until 1990. She became an assistant professor at the University of Hawaii Law School before being appointed a District Court judge on November 30, 1993. She was elevated to the Circuit Courts on June 29, 1995.

McKenna was one of three candidates recommended to President Barack Obama by Senators Daniel Inouye and Daniel Akaka to fill a judicial vacancy on the United States District Court for the District of Hawaii. McKenna did not receive the nomination, which went to Leslie E. Kobayashi in April 2010.

On January 25, 2011, Governor Neil Abercrombie nominated McKenna to a seat on the Hawaii Supreme Court. The Hawaii Senate Judiciary Committee held a hearing on her nomination on February 4 and advanced her nomination to the full Senate by a vote of 5–0. Over one hundred pieces of testimony were submitted to the Judiciary Committee with respect to her nomination, the vast majority of which were supportive of McKenna. Of the five testimonies that opposed McKenna's appointment, four did so because of her sexual orientation. On February 16, 2011, the Hawaii Senate approved her nomination by a vote of 23–0. She was sworn in on March 3, 2011. She became acting chief justice upon the retirement of Mark E. Recktenwald.

== Personal ==
McKenna has three children. McKenna is the first openly gay judge to serve on the Hawaii Supreme Court. As of 2023, she is one of twelve openly LGBT state supreme court justices serving in the United States.

McKenna's domestic partner, Denise, is a public school teacher.

== See also ==
- List of Asian American jurists
- List of LGBT jurists in the United States
- List of LGBT state supreme court justices in the United States

Legal offices
Preceded by Mark E. Recktenwald	Associate Justice of the Hawaii Supreme Court; 2011–present	Incumbent
Preceded by Mark E. Recktenwald	Chief Justice of the Hawaii Supreme Court; Acting; 2025–2026	Succeeded by Vladimir Devens
