= Hawaii Intermediate Court of Appeals =

Intermediate appellate court of Hawaii

- Established: 1979
- Jurisdiction: Hawaii, United States
- Location: Honolulu, Hawaii
- Composition method: Governor nomination with Senate confirmation
- Authorized by: Haw. Const. art. VI, § 2.
- Appeals to: Supreme Court of Hawaii
- Judge term length: 10 years
- Number of positions: 7
- Website: Hawaii Intermediate Court of Appeals

Chief Judge
- Currently: Karen T. Nakasone
- Since: August 12, 2025

The Hawaii State Intermediate Court of Appeals (ICA) is the intermediate appellate court of the Hawaii State Judiciary. It has jurisdiction over appeals from lower courts and agencies.

The ICA is composed of one chief judge and six associate judges, who sit in randomly selected panels of three. Each judge is appointed to an initial ten-year term by the Governor. Judges are nominated by the Governor from a list of four to six names submitted by the Judicial Selection Commission. A judge's nomination is subject to confirmation by the Hawaii Senate, but reappointments require only approval of the Judicial Selection Commission. Under article VI, §3 of the Hawaii Constitution, all judges of the Intermediate Court of Appeals, like the justices of the Supreme Court of Hawaii and the judges of the Hawaii State Circuit Courts, have a mandatory retirement age of 70.

== History ==
The Intermediate Court of Appeals was established in 1979. The court consisted of one chief judge and two associate judges. Annual salary of the chief judge was set at $45,000 and the associates judges were set at $43,750. The court shared concurrent jurisdiction with the Hawaii Supreme Court.

Originally, Hawaii adopted the so-called "push-down" or "deflective" model of appellate procedure still used in a small number of other states. Following judgment or appropriate agency decision, a party filed an application for writ of certiorari with the Hawaii Supreme Court. Following granting of a writ of certiorari, the Hawaii Supreme Court would then assign the case to the Intermediate Court of Appeals or to itself. The Hawaii Supreme Court could also reassign a case to itself under limited circumstances.

In 1992, the court expanded to one chief judge and three associate judges.

In 2001, the court expanded to one chief judge and five associate judges.

In 2004, Hawaii changed its appellate procedure so that all appeals from the lower courts and agency decisions would now go directly to the Intermediate Court of Appeals, meaning that court would normally be the first to rule on the merits of an appeal. However, a party could still submit an application to transfer a case to the Hawaii Supreme Court upon the grounds of a question of imperative or fundamental public importance; an appeal from a decision of any court or agency when appeals are allowed by law invalidating an amendment to the state constitution or determining a state statute, county ordinance, or agency rule to be invalid on the grounds that it was invalidly enacted or is unconstitutional, on its face or as applied, under either the constitution of the State or the United States; or a sentence of life imprisonment without the possibility of parole.

For the 2016-2017 state fiscal year, the budget for the Hawaii Supreme Court and the Intermediate Court of Appeals was approximately $6.7 million.

In 2022, the court expanded to one chief judge and six associate judges.

== Salaries ==
The Commission on Salaries has recommend the following salaries for the chief judge and the associate judges:

	7/1/2013	7/1/2014	7/1/2015	7/1/2016	7/1/2017	7/1/2018
Chief Judge	$198,588	$202,560	$206,616	$210,744	$214,956	$219,252
Associate Judge	$190,908	$194,724	$198,624	$202,596	$206,652	$210,780

== Current judges ==
As of 16 April 2026 the judges were:

Name	Start	Term Ends	Appointer	Law School
Karen Nakasone, Chief Judge	July 1, 2025 (Note: Nakasone previously served as an associate judge starting on November 2, 2020)	June 30, 2035	Josh Green (D) (Note: Originally appointed as an associate judge by David Ige (D))	Boston University
Katherine Leonard	January 30, 2008	January 29, 2028	Linda Lingle (R)	Hawaii
Keith Hiraoka	November 19, 2018	November 18, 2028	David Ige (D)	UC Berkeley
Clyde Wadsworth	October 21, 2019	October 20, 2029	David Ige (D)	UCLA
Sonja McCullen	October 1, 2021	September 30, 2031	David Ige (D)	Hawaii
Kimberly Guidry	May 31, 2023	May 30, 2033	Josh Green (D)	Hawaii
Daniel Gluck	April 16, 2026	April 15, 2036	Josh Green (D)	Harvard

== See also ==
- Courts of Hawaii
