= William S. Richardson School of Law =

Law school of the University of Hawaii

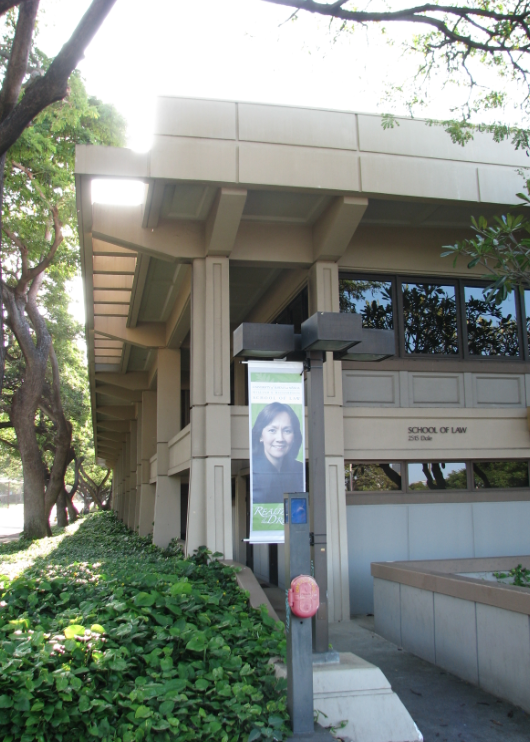
- Motto: Ma luna aʻe o na lahui a pau ke ola ke kanaka (Hawaiian); Above all nations is humanity
- Parent school: University of Hawaiʻi at Mānoa
- Established: 1973
- School type: Public
- Dean: Camille A. Nelson
- Location: Honolulu, HI, United States; 21°17′47″N 157°49′05″W
- Enrollment: 257
- Faculty: 52
- USNWR ranking: 91st (2026)
- Website: law.hawaii.edu
- ABA profile: Standard 509 Report

The William S. Richardson School of Law is the law school at the University of Hawaiʻi at Mānoa. Located in Honolulu, Hawaii, it is the only law school in the state of Hawaii.

The school's curriculum emphasizes fields of law relevant to Hawaii and the surrounding Pacific and Asian region, including Native Hawaiian Law, Pacific-Asian Legal Studies, Environmental Law, and maritime law.

A member of the Association of American Law Schools (AALS), the school is accredited by the Council of the Section of Legal Education and Admissions to the Bar of the American Bar Association (ABA). It offers a Juris Doctor through full-time and part-time study, with certificates available in Native Hawaiian Law, Pacific-Asian Legal Studies, and Environmental Law. It also offers an Advanced Juris Doctor for foreign students who have earned a law degree abroad and an LLM.

For 2021, U.S. News & World Report ranked Richardson 96th among American law schools. Richardson's part-time program was ranked 30th.

== William S. Richardson ==
The school is named after former Hawaii State Supreme Court Chief Justice William S. Richardson.

Richardson advocated establishing the law school, which opened in 1973. For many years, he had pressed the Hawaii State Legislature to create a law school, arguing that the state would benefit from providing residents with a legal education that incorporated local cultural customs. Upon his retirement, the law school was named in his honor.

== Ethos ==
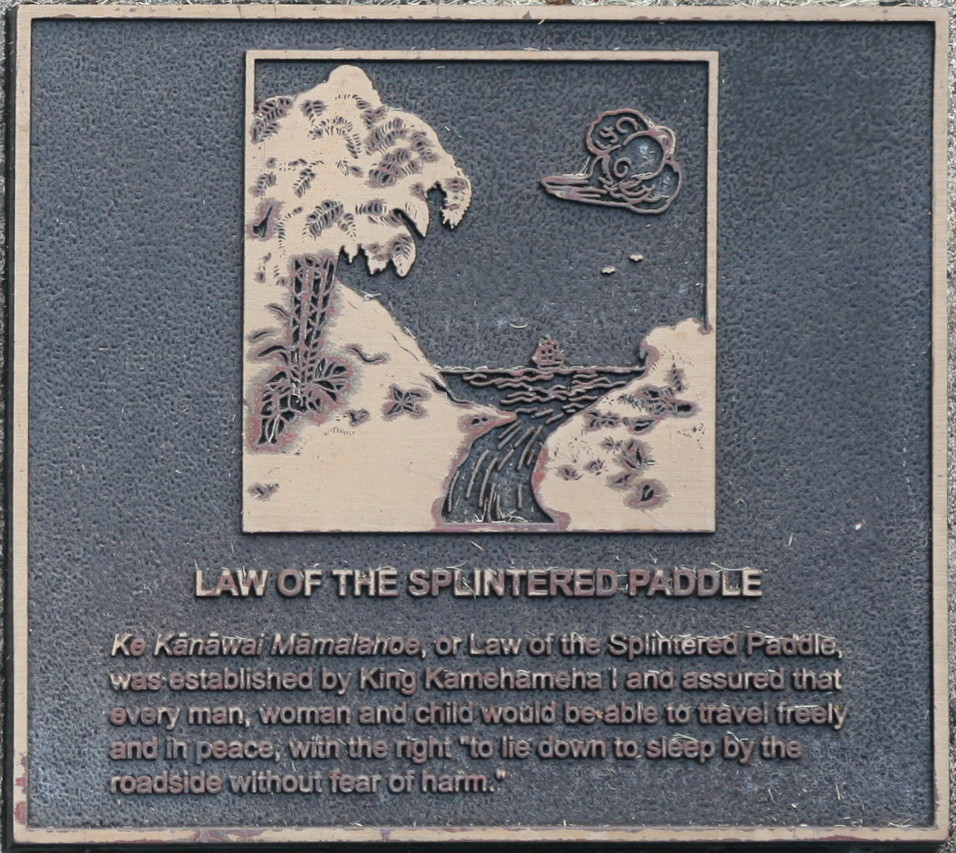
Kānāwai Māmalahoe, on a plaque under the Kamehameha Statues.

The school identifies Kānāwai Māmalahoe, or the Law of the Splintered Paddle, as an influence on its mission.

Kānāwai Māmalahoe originated in a royal edict by King Kamehameha I in 1797 and was later enshrined in the Hawaii State Constitution, Article 9, Section 10.

According to Hawaiian legend, Kānāwai Māmalahoe was declared by King Kamehameha after an incident in which he chased two fishermen who were fishing illegally. He caught his leg in the reef, and one of the fishermen, Kaleleiki, struck him on the head in self-defense with a paddle that broke into pieces. Kamehameha escaped. Years later, when the same fisherman was brought before him to account for the incident, Kamehameha held that in the interest of justice he should be released, as he had only been searching for food for his family.

The school’s mission statement describes a "commitment... to a collaborative community that is deeply committed to the... pursuit of social and economic justice" for all. Its unofficial logo depicts Kaleleiki, the fisherman.

== Historical timeline ==
=== 1970s ===
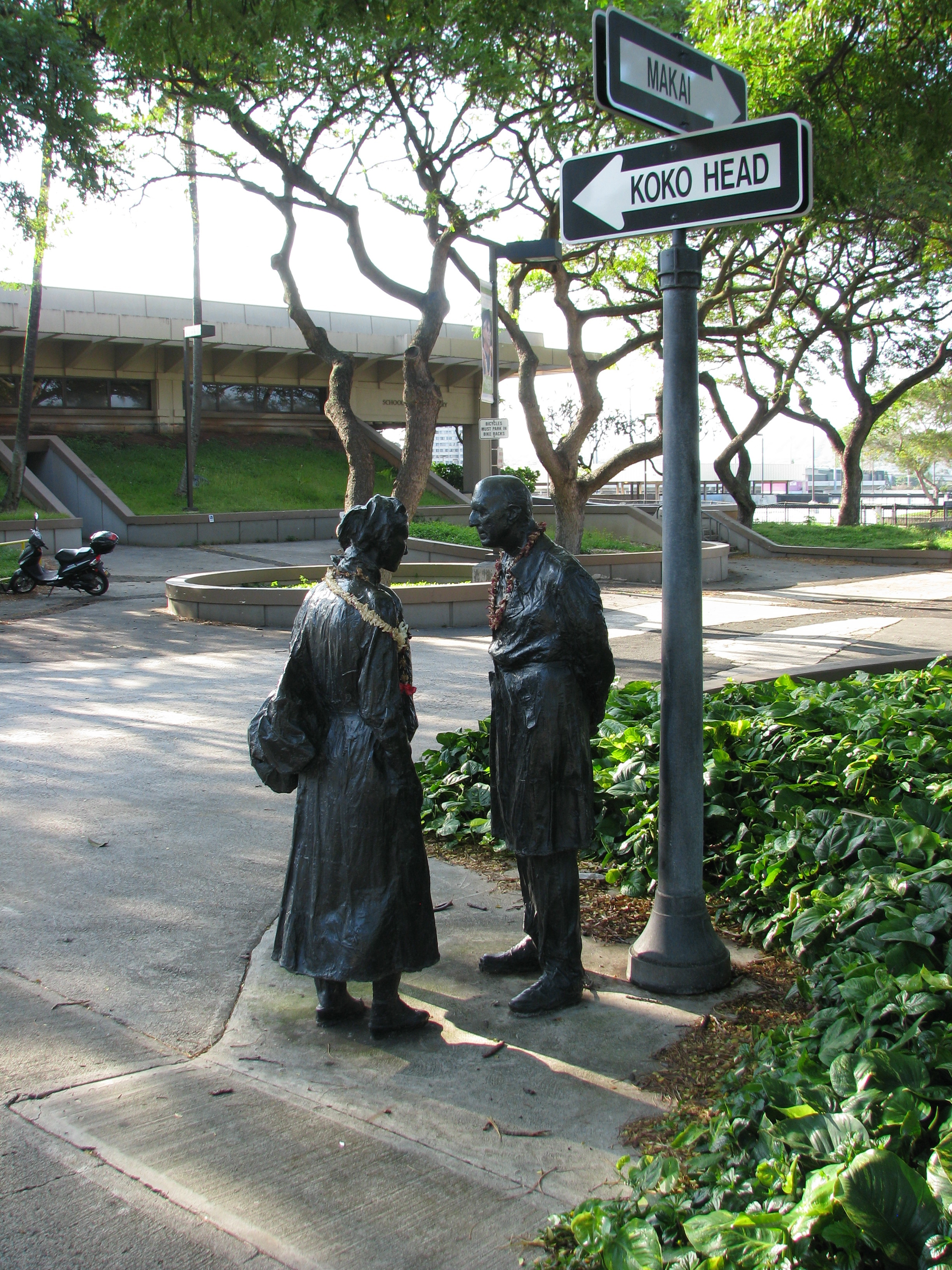
University of Hawaiʻi at Mānoa campus with the William S. Richardson School of Law library in the background

- 1968 – The Hawaii State Legislature established the William S. Richardson School of Law.
- 1972 – David Hood appointed dean.
- 1973 – Richardson enrolled its first class of 53 students.
- 1974 – The American Bar Association granted William S. Richardson School of Law provisional accreditation.
- 1976 – Jerome Dupont appointed acting dean.
- 1977 – Cliff Thompson appointed dean.
- 1978 – Richardson held the first Ete Bowl.
- 1979 – University of Hawaii Law Review created.

=== 1980s ===
- 1981 – Richard Miller appointed dean.
- 1982 – The American Bar Association granted William S. Richardson School of Law full accreditation.
- 1982 – Richardson sent its first Moot Court team to a competition.
- 1983 – William S. Richardson School of Law moved into new facilities on the campus of the University of Hawaiʻi at Mānoa.
- 1983 – Richardson Law Library opened.
- 1983 – Pacific-Asian Legal Studies program began.
- 1985 – Jeremy Harrison appointed dean.
- 1985 – Student Bar Association formed.
- 1987 – The school joined the United States Supreme Court Jurists-in-Residence Program.

=== 1990s ===
- 1991 – Elder Law Program formed.
- 1992 – Environmental Law Certificate established.
- 1995 – Lawrence Foster appointed dean.
- 1995 – Pacific-Asian Legal Studies Certificate established.
- 1999 – Asian-Pacific Law & Policy Journal (APLPJ) established.

=== 2000s ===
- 2002 – Law Student Pledge adopted.
- 2003 – Aviam Soifer appointed dean.
- 2003 – LLM program started.
- 2005 – Ka Huli Ao Center for Excellence in Native Hawaiian Law established through a Native Hawaiian Education Act grant.
- 2005 – Hawaii Innocence Project established.
- 2008 – Richardson established a part-time evening law program.
- 2009 – Richardson received a grant from SBS Media Holdings in Seoul, South Korea for $200,000 to establish a Korean Law Faculty Fund.

=== 2010s ===
- 2010 – Chief Justice William S. Richardson died on June 21.
- 2011 – Professor Jon Van Dyke died.
- 2016 – Dean Jeremy Thomas Harrison died.

== Rankings ==
=== 2016 ===
- U.S. News & World Report ranked Richardson 82nd among its 142 ranked law schools. Richardson's part-time program was ranked 30th.

== Employment ==
According to Richardson's official 2013 ABA-required disclosures, 50.9% of the Class of 2013 obtained full-time, long-term, JD-required employment nine months after graduation. Richardson's Law School Transparency under-employment score is 10.2%, indicating the percentage of the class of 2017 unemployed, pursuing an additional degree, or working in a short-term, part-time, or non-professional job nine months after graduation.

== Costs ==
The total cost of attendance (indicating the cost of tuition, fees, and living expenses) at the Richardson School of Law for the 2014–2015 academic year was $37,934 for Hawaii residents and $57,662 for non-residents. In 2017, Law School Transparency estimated the debt-financed cost of attendance for three years at $166,060 for residents and $261,639 for non-residents. In July 2016, Richardson was ranked #1 by U.S. News & World Report among American law schools whose alumni have the least debt, at an average of $54,988 for the Class of 2015.

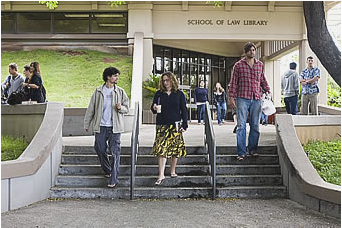
The William S. Richardson School of Law Library

== Institutes, programs & centers ==
=== Institutes ===
- Institute of Asian-Pacific Business Law. The Institute of Asian-Pacific Business Law was established in June 2006. Its stated goal is to support research and training in business law in Asia and the Pacific. The Institute focuses on commercial law, insolvency and secured transactions, corporate law and business transactions, securities, intellectual property, real estate financing, and labor law issues. The Institute's activities facilitate direct exchanges between the academic, legal, and business communities in Hawaii and throughout the Asia-Pacific region.
- Hammurabi Legal Forum: The Hammurabi Legal Forum for the Rule of Law (HLF) was established in 2008 at the school to help law schools in Iraq reinvigorate the country's tradition of scholarship. By providing an online database of free legal resources, HLF originally sought to provide information on issues that are important to Iraq and the Iraqi legal community. In 2009, the HLF expanded its efforts to assist Rule of Law activities in the Kurdistan Region of Iraq. In 2010, it further expanded its research to incorporate additional regions of the globe, including Afghanistan and the Pacific Region, with a special focus on Timor-Leste.

=== Programs ===
- Hawaii Innocence Project: The Hawaii Innocence Project's mission is to provide pro bono representation to incarcerated persons who have a credible claim of actual innocence.

University of Hawaii Elder Law Program (UHELP): Operating throughout the year, UHELP provides Hawaii's elder community basic legal assistance, advice and information.

=== Centers ===
- Ka Huli Ao Center for Excellence in Native Hawaiian Law. Established in 2005 through a Native Hawaiian Education Act grant, the Center is an academic center that promotes education, scholarship, community outreach and collaboration on issues of law, culture and justice for Native Hawaiians and other Pacific and Indigenous peoples. The center focuses on education, research and scholarship, community outreach, and the preservation of historical, legal, and traditional and customary materials. It also offers new courses and supports Native Hawaiian and other law students as they pursue legal careers and leadership roles.
- Hawaii Health Law Policy Center aims to (1) conduct and disseminate research on health law policy aimed at improving health care access in Hawaii; (2) serve as a focus for multidisciplinary research and teaching on health law and policy in the context of Hawaii; and (3) bring community leaders, health care policymakers, faculty members, and students together to find solutions to health care shortages and other barriers to access in Hawaii's rural, impoverished, or otherwise underserved communities.

== Scholarly publications ==
=== University of Hawaii Law Review ===
The University of Hawaii Law Review is a scholarly legal journal run by students that publishes works by jurists, scholars and practitioners. It publishes two issues annually and hosts a biennial symposium.

=== Asian-Pacific Law & Policy Journal ===
The Asian-Pacific Law & Policy Journal (APLPJ) is a biannual peer-reviewed open-access law journal published by the school. It covers issues facing Asia and the Pacific Rim. The journal was established in 1999 and first published in February 2000, with Jim Hitchingham as editor-in-chief and with assistance and support from Lawrence Foster, Dean of the law school, and professors Ronald Brown and Mark Levin. In addition to its web format, the journal is available through the legal databases LexisNexis and Westlaw.

== Visiting tribunals & jurist-in-residence programs ==
=== Visiting tribunals ===
==== United States Court of Appeals for the Ninth Circuit & Hawaii Supreme Court ====
Each year, the United States Court of Appeals for the Ninth Circuit sits specially at the school to hear some appeals from the United States District Court for the Districts of Hawaii and Guam. The Hawaii Supreme Court also sits regularly.

=== Jurist-in-residence programs ===
==== Bright International Jurist-in-Residence Program ====
Established in 2007 with the support of Senior Circuit Judge Myron H. Bright of the United States Court of Appeals for the Eighth Circuit, the Bright International Jurist-in-Residence program hosts international jurists to facilitate dialogue with the wider community and the school's faculty and staff.

In 2007, Israeli Supreme Court judge Aharon Barak was the visiting scholar. In 2010, Hisashi Owada, the president of the International Court of Justice, served as a visiting scholar.

==== U.S. Supreme Court Jurist-in-Residence Program ====
Richardson’s U.S. Supreme Court Jurist-in-Residence Program was instituted in 1987 with the support of Myron H. Bright, a senior circuit judge for the United States Court of Appeals for the Eighth Circuit. Biannually, a visiting U.S. Supreme Court Justice presents seminars on current judicial issues and teaches classes.

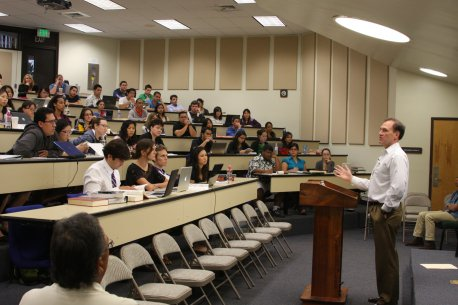
Supreme Court Justice Samuel Alito teaching a Richardson civil procedure class, 2011

== Faculty ==
=== Endowed professorship & faculty chairs ===
Through the University of Hawaiʻi at Mānoa Foundation, Richardson has been endowed with several professorships and faculty chairs.

- Benjamin A. Kudo Professor of Law
- Dan & Maggie Inouye Distinguished Chair In Democratic Ideas
- Fred T. Korematsu Professorship In Law and Social Justice
- George J Johnson Visiting Professor Endowment
- Michael J. Marks Distinguished Professor of Business Law
- Wallace S. Fujiyama Distinguished Visiting Professor of Law
- Carlsmith Ball Faculty Scholar Fund
- SBS Holdings Co. Korean Faculty Fund

=== Notable faculty ===
In 2013, The Princeton Review ranked the Richardson faculty as the third "Most Diverse Faculty." In 2012, U.S. News & World Report ranked the school third of 190 law schools for "Smallest Faculty-Student Ratio".

Current notable faculty:

- David L. Callies, scholar of real property law
- Tae-Ung Baik, former Korean prisoner of conscience, specialist in international human rights law and Korean law
- Mari Matsuda, activist legal scholar, lawyer, first tenured female Asian-American law professor
- Randall Roth
- Richard W. Pollack
- Aviam Soifer, constitutional law scholar, former dean of Boston College Law School
- Eric Yamamoto, Korematsu Professor of Law and Social Justice

Former faculty

- Julian Aguon, Chamorro human rights attorney and author (formerly the Dan and Maggie Inouye Distinguished Chair)
- Chris Iijima, legal scholar, Asian-American civil rights activist, folk singer (deceased)
- Jon Van Dyke, constitutional law scholar, lawyer, activist (deceased)

== Students ==
=== Student body ===
In 2013, U.S. News & World Report ranked the school 25th of 190 law schools for "Most Selective". In 2013, U.S. News & World Report ranked it first of 190 law schools for "Diversity Index," while Princeton Review ranked it "Best Environment for Minority Students."

=== Law student pledge ===
The William S. Richardson School of Law Law Student Pledge, written by the late professor Chris Iijima, was adopted in 2002 as an aspirational reflection of Kānāwai Māmalahoe. Before beginning their legal education, students recite the pledge before a Hawaii Supreme Court justice during a special ceremony.

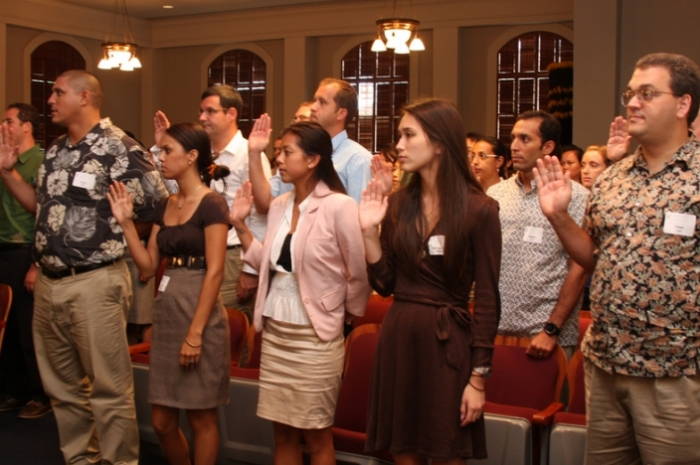
Richardson students reciting the law student pledge at Hawaii Supreme Court

The pledge is:

In the study of law, I will conscientiously prepare myself;

To advance the interests of those I serve before my own,

To approach my responsibilities and colleagues with integrity, professionalism, and civility,

To guard zealously legal, civil and human rights which are the birthright of all people,

And, above all,

To endeavor always to seek justice.

This I do pledge.

== Student organizations ==
Richardson sponsors numerous student organizations, including:

- 'Ahahui O Hawai'i
- Advocates For Public Interest Law (APIL)
- American Inns of Court (The Hon. James S. Burns Aloha Chapter of the Inns of Court)
- American Bar Association-Student Chapter
- Black Law Student Association (BLSA)
- Christian Legal Society (CLS)
- Delta Theta Phi Legal Fraternity (DTP)
- Environmental Law Society (ELS)

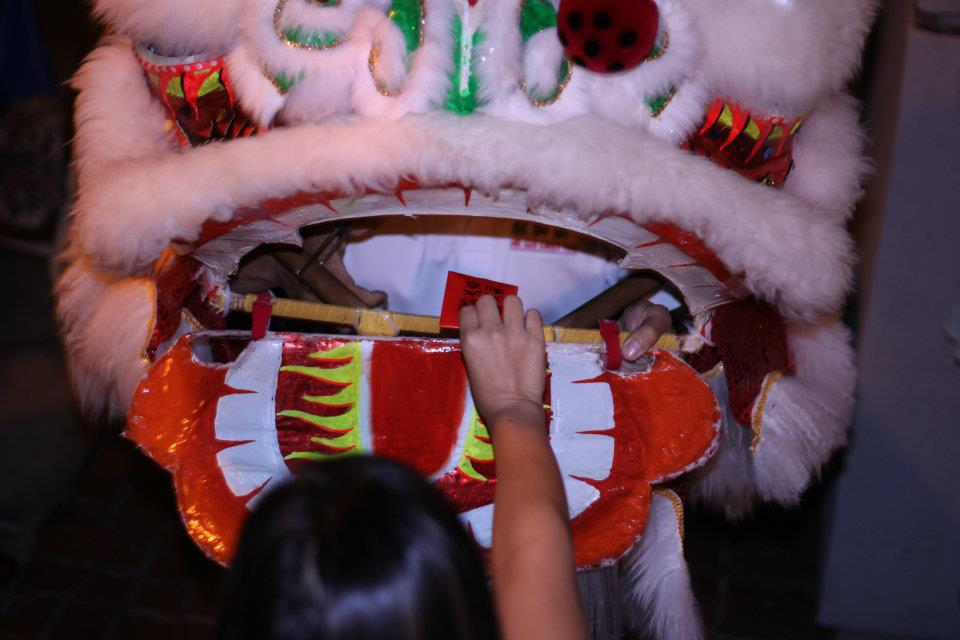
The Pacific-Asian Legal Studies Organization's (PALSO) annual Lunar New Year party

- Federalist Society
- Federal Bar Association Hawaii Law Student Division
- Filipino Law School Association (FLSA)
- Hammurabi Legal Forum
- Hawaii Women's Lawyers
- La Alianza
- Lambda Law Student Association
- Pacific-Asian Legal Studies Organization (PALSO)
- Phi Delta Phi International Legal Fraternity
- Richardson Golf Association
- Running Group
- Self Defense Club
- Soccer Club
- Street Law
- Student Animal League Defense Fund (SALDF)
- Student Bar Association (SBA)
- Students With Keiki
- Sustainable Richardson
- TED Richardson

== Moot Court teams ==
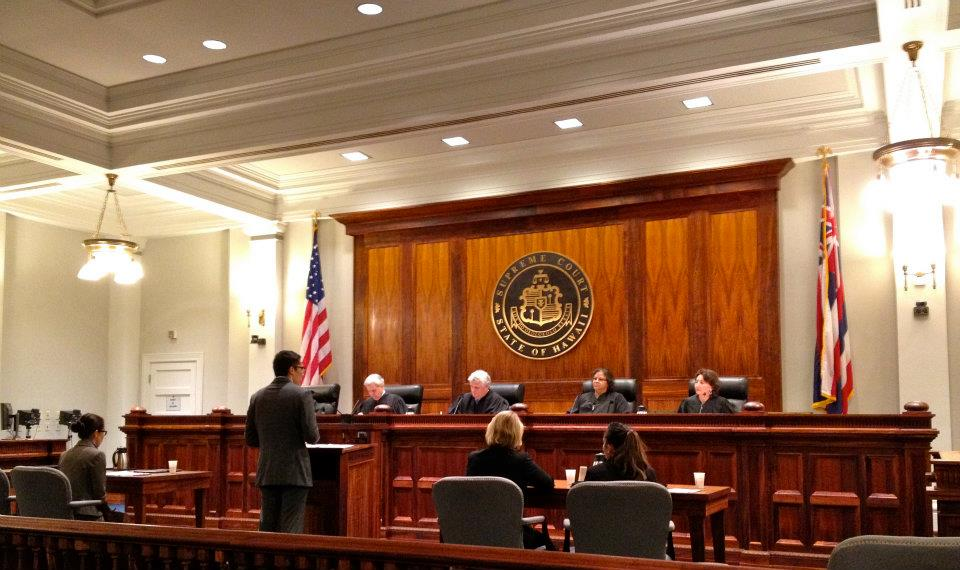
Richardson students competing at the 2012 Native American Law Student Association competition finals at Hawaii Supreme Court in Honolulu

Richardson fields Moot Court teams, composed of students, in competitions across many legal areas. In addition, Richardson fields a competitive Client Counseling Team.

=== Moot court teams ===
- Environmental Moot Court Team
- Hispanic Moot Court Team
- Saul Lefkowtiz Intellectual Property Moot Court Team
- International Environmental Moot Court Team
- International Negotiations Team
- Mock Trial Team
- Native American Moot Court Team
- Philip C. Jessup International Law Moot Court Competition Team
- Robert F. Wagner Labor & Employment Law Moot Court Team
- Space Law Moot Court Team

== Law school traditions ==
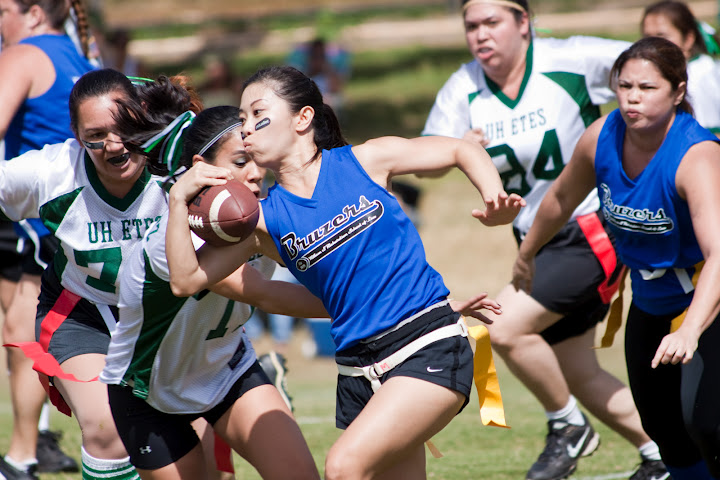
Ete Bowl football teams

A list of some of Richardson's traditions:

- Student Pledge

The Law Student Pledge, written by the late professor Chris Iijima, was adopted in 2002 as an aspirational reflection of Kānāwai Māmalahoe. Before beginning their legal education, students recite it before a Hawaii Supreme Court justice during a special ceremony.

- Ete Bowl

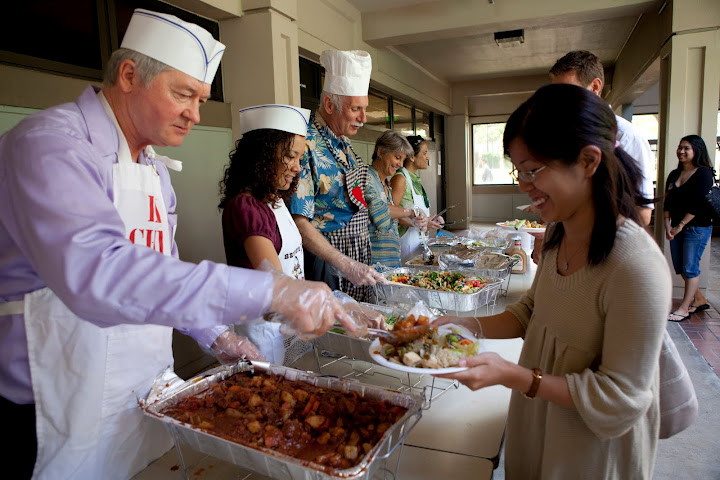
Stew Day

Since 1978, Richardson has held an annual flag football game between alumnae and female law students. The teams consist of alumnae ("Bruzers") and female law students ("Etes"), while male students dressed in drag serve as cheerleaders.

- Stew Day

On Stew Day, a tradition begun by Professor Calvin Pang, Richardson faculty members wear hats and aprons and serve students a stew lunch. Pang also introduced the "Red Socks Award" in honor of Dean Aviam Soifer, a Boston Red Sox fan.

== Notable alumni ==
Politics

- Colleen Hanabusa, US Congressional Representative
- Florence T. Nakakuni, United States Attorney for the District of Hawaii
- John D. Waihee III, Former Hawaii Governor
- Duke Aiona, 10th Lieutenant Governor of Hawaii
- Earl I. Anzai, Former Hawaii State Attorney General
- Brian Taniguchi, Hawaii State Senator
- Dwight Takamine, Hawaii State Senator
- Blake Oshiro, Majority Leader, Hawaii House of Representatives
- Quentin Kawānanakoa, minority leader, Hawaii House of Representatives
- Della Au Belatti, Hawaii House of Representatives
- Sharon Har, Hawaii House of Representatives
- Scott Nishimoto, Hawaii House of Representatives
- Maile Shimabukuro, Hawaii House of Representatives
- Kirk Caldwell, Mayor of Honolulu, Hawaii
- Billy Kenoi, Mayor of Hawaii Island
- Doug Chin, 14th Attorney General of Hawaii and 13th Lieutenant Governor of Hawaii
- Kimberlyn King-Hinds, US Congressional Delegate from the Northern Mariana Islands

Judiciary

- Sabrina McKenna, Associate Justice of the Supreme Court of Hawaii
- Oldiais Ngiraikelau, Chief Justice of Palau

Academia

- Noelle Kahanu
- Mari Matsuda

Other

- Katherine Kealoha, former Honolulu deputy prosecutor and convicted felon
- Norman Wong, writer
