= Supreme Court of Hawaii =

Highest court in the U.S. state of Hawaii

Coordinates: 21.3055°N 157.8600°W

Hawaii Supreme Court
- ʻAha Hoʻokolokolo Kiʻekiʻe o Hawaiʻi (Hawaiian)
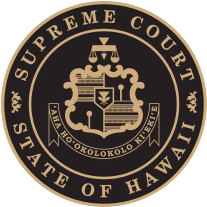
- Seal of the Hawaii Supreme Court
- Interactive map of Hawaii Supreme Court
- Established: 1841
- Location: Honolulu, Hawaii, United States
- Composition method: Governor nomination with Senate confirmation
- Authorised by: Haw. Const. art. VI, § 2.
- Appeals to: Supreme Court of the United States (for matters involving federal law or the U.S. Constitution only)
- Judge term length: 10 years
- Number of positions: 5
- Website: Hawaii Supreme Court

Chief Justice
- Currently: Vladimir Devens
- Since: May 5, 2026

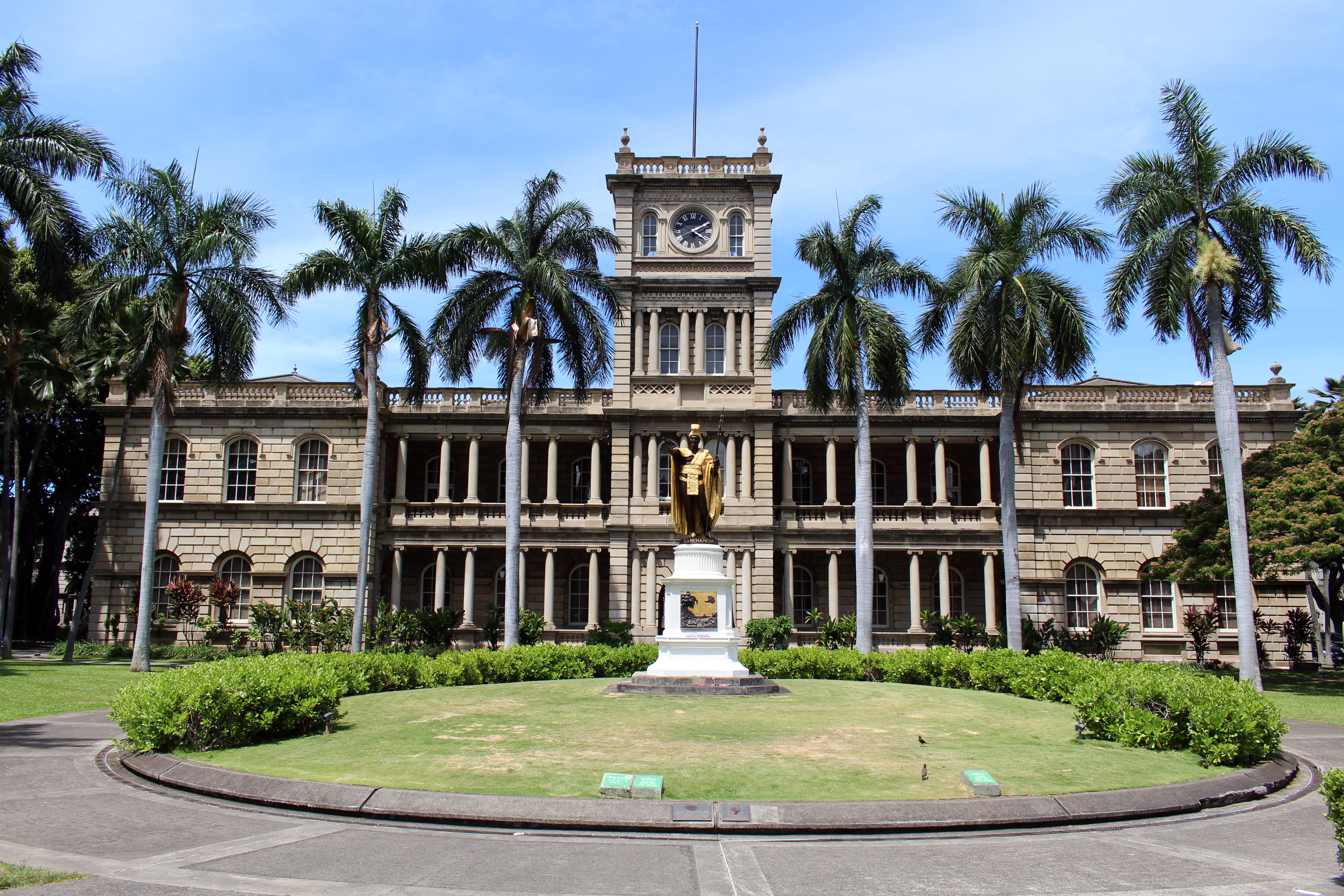
Aliʻiōlani Hale, the building where the Hawaiʻi State Supreme Court meets

The Supreme Court of Hawaii (Hawaiian: ʻAha Hoʻokolokolo Kiʻekiʻe o Hawaiʻi) is the highest court of the State of Hawaii in the United States. Its decisions are binding on all other courts of the Hawaii State Judiciary. The principal purpose of the Supreme Court is to review the decisions of the trial courts in which appeals have been granted. Appeals are decided by the members of the Supreme Court based on written records and in some cases may grant oral arguments in the main Supreme Court chamber. Like its mainland United States counterparts, the Supreme Court does not take evidence and uses only evidence provided in previous trials.

The Supreme Court of Hawaii meets in Aliʻiōlani Hale in Honolulu.

== History ==
The case law reported in Hawaiian Reports dates back to January 1847 and the reign of Kamehameha III, long before Hawaii was annexed by the United States in 1898. (Early Hawaiian cases were originally reported in The Polynesian.)

Kamehemeha III sought to modernize the Hawaiian Kingdom by rapidly transitioning from indigenous traditions to a new legal system based on Anglo-American common law. Hawaii is one of the rare examples of an indigenous polity which voluntarily adopted the common law (albeit as part of the larger objective of avoiding annexation by larger colonial powers), in contrast to the common law's coercive imposition elsewhere by English-speaking colonists.

== Functions ==
The Hawaii State Supreme Court has original jurisdiction to answer questions of law that have been passed to it from trial courts or the federal court, hear civil cases submitted to the Supreme Court on agreed statements of facts, and decide questions coming from proceedings of writs of mandamus, prohibition, and habeas corpus.

== Justices ==
The Supreme Court consists of five justices who are initially appointed to ten-year terms by the Governor of Hawaii, who makes their nomination from a list of four to six candidates from the Hawaii Judicial Selection Commission. The Governor's nominee is subject to confirmation by the Hawaii State Senate. Candidates must be U.S. citizens, Hawaii residents, and have been licensed to practice law for at least 10 years prior to nomination. The Judicial Selection Commission can opt to retain incumbent justices for additional ten-year terms. All justices must retire at 70 years of age.

As of May 1, 2026, the justices are:

Name	Born	Start	Current term	Mandatory retirement (Note: Justices must retire once they attain the age of 70.)	Appointer	Law school
Vladimir Devens, Chief Justice since May 5, 2026	1962 (age 63–64)	Jan 12, 2024	May 5, 2026 – May 4, 2036	2032	Josh Green (D)	UC Berkeley
Sabrina McKenna	October 7, 1957 (age 69)	Mar 3, 2011	Mar 3, 2021 – Mar 2, 2031	2027	Neil Abercrombie (D)	Hawaii; Duke (LLM)
Todd W. Eddins	March 18, 1964 (age 62)	Dec 11, 2020	Dec 11, 2020 – Dec 10, 2030	2034	David Ige (D)	Hawaii
Lisa M. Ginoza	October 20, 1964 (age 62)	Jan 12, 2024	Jan 12, 2024 – Jan 11, 2034	2034	Josh Green (D)	Hawaii
Vacant						

=== Vacancy and pending nomination ===
Vacator	Reason	Vacancy Date	Nominee	Nomination Date
Vladimir Devens	Elevation	May 5, 2026	Pending	TBD

== Cases ==
- Baehr v. Miike (1999)
- Sunoco v. Honolulu (2023)
- Hawaii v. Wilson (2024)

== See also ==
- Hawaii State Judiciary
- Courts of Hawaii
