= Ambrose K. Hutchison =

Hawaiian resident leader of the leper settlement of Kalaupapa

- Ambrose K. Hutchison (top) at a meeting of The Holy Name Society at Kalaupapa, 1920s. His identification in the image is based on the opinions of Hutchison family relatives.
- Born: c. 1856; Honomāʻele, Hāna, Maui
- Died: July 17, 1932 (aged 76)
- Occupation: resident superintendent of Kalaupapa Leprosy Settlement
- Spouse: Mary Kaiakonui
- Parent(s): Ferdinand William Hutchison and Malie Moa

Ambrose Kanoealiʻi or Ambrose Kanewaliʻi Hutchison (c. 1856 – July 17, 1932) was a long-time Native Hawaiian resident of the Kalaupapa Leprosy Settlement on the island of Molokaʻi who resided there for fifty-three years from 1879 to his death in 1932. During his residence, he assumed a prominent leadership role in the patient community and served as luna or resident superintendent of Kalaupapa from 1884 to 1897.

== Early life ==
Ambrose Hutchison was born in Honomāʻele, Hāna, Maui, in 1856, the son of Ferdinand William Hutchison and Maria or Malie Moa, a Native Hawaiian woman. His father, originally from Edinburgh, was an influential politician during the reign of King Kamehameha V and served as president of the Board of Health during the early development and management of the Kalaupapa Leprosy Settlement. His mother died when he was young and his father left Maui for Honolulu to pursue a political career, leaving Ambrose and his siblings William and Christina in the care of their mother's relatives.

Hutchison was given at one month old to be raised by his mother's sister who was a kahuna known for herbal cures. He wrote, in later life, that he may have contracted leprosy from a man "with large ears and bloated face, swollen hands and feet", who his aunt had treated. Another possible source was a vaccination using the lymph fluid from the arm of another boy. From an early age, Hutchison was sent to boarding school in Honolulu under the auspices of the Anglican Archdeacon George Mason. At this time, the first symptoms of leprosy developed in 1868 when he was twelve years old and developed slowly until he became an adult.

His father and his sister Christina left Hawaii for Australia in 1875. Hutchison never mentioned his father by name in later life, possibly to shield him from the stigma of being related to a leper.

== Life at Kalaupapa ==
In December 1878, Hutchison was arrested for being a suspected leper and detained at Honolulu's Kalihi Hospital for examination. Hawaiian law required anyone suspected of contracting leprosy to report for medical examination or face arrest. On January 5, 1879, the diagnosed Hutchison was sent to the leper settlement of Kalaupapa on the island of Molokaʻi to be isolated with others with the disease. He worked as chief butcher and beef dispenser and head storekeeper of the Kalawao store until 1884 when he was appointed as resident superintendent succeeding Clayton Strawn and Rudolph Wilhelm Meyer. Hutchison became the first government appointed superintendent of Native Hawaiian descent. Although Hawaiians had held the positions as luna or resident superintendent prior to 1884, they were all subordinate to Meyer and not trusted with financial affairs. From 1884 to 1890, he served alone in this post with the continued support of Meyer. Between 1890 and 1892, he served as assistant superintendent with Maui sheriff Thomas Evans and Evans' successor William Tell, the former head of Honolulu police. After 1892, Hutchison was reappointed as acting superintendent, a position he held until replaced by Board of Health official C. B. Reynolds after the death of his main supporter Rudolph Meyer in 1897. Hutchison was highly regarded by the Native Hawaiian patient community and the Board of Health in Honolulu. According to resident physician Arthur Albert St. Mouritz, he "displayed marked ability and highly creditable administrative powers for a man so young." In 1898, Hutchison and his wife along with more than seven hundred people at Kalaupapa signed the famous Kūʻē Petitions against the annexation of Hawaii to the United States.

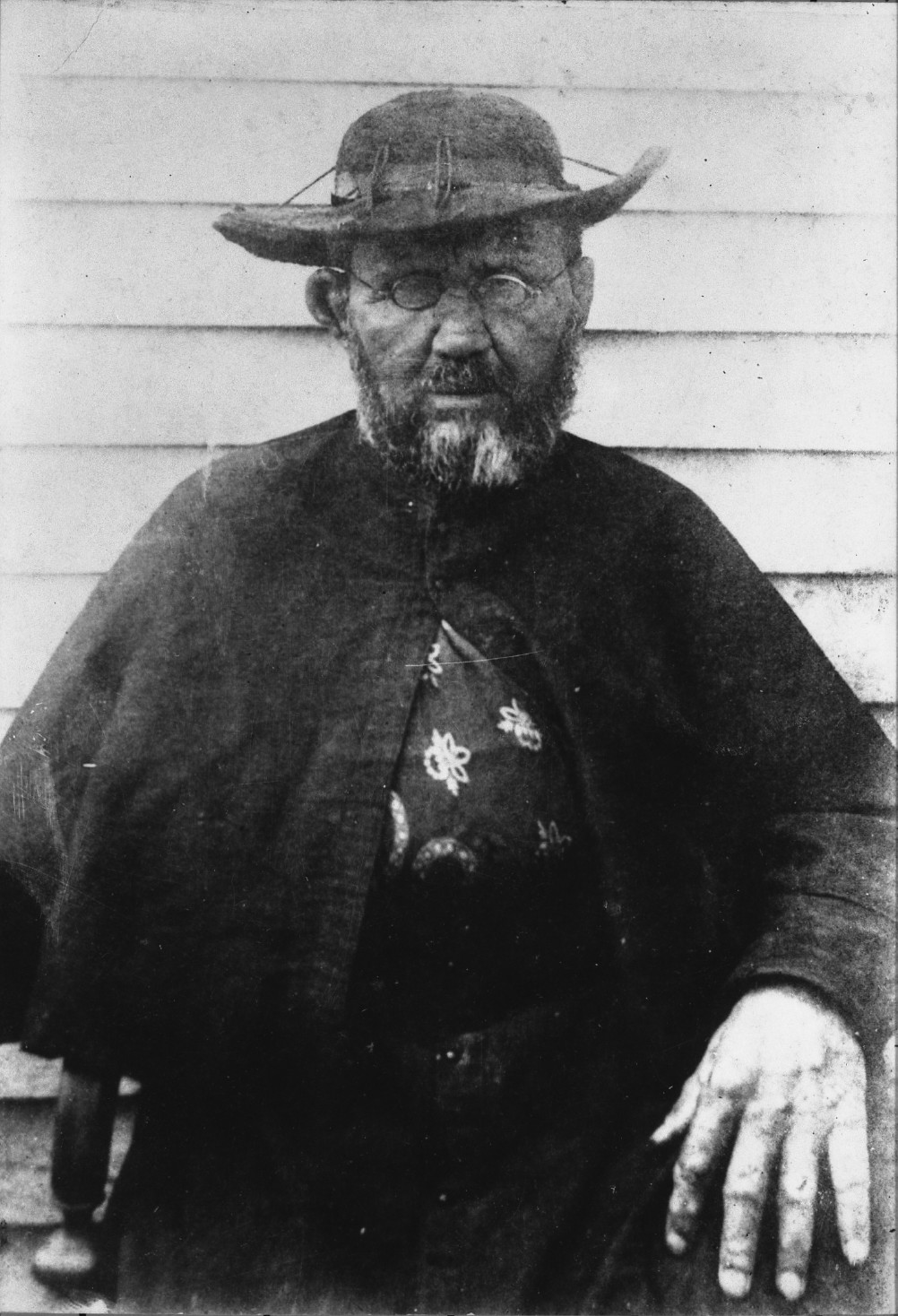
Hutchison developed a close friendship with Father Damien

During his residency on Kalaupapa, Hutchison worked with Father Damien, whom he had met on his arrival in 1879, and became one of the closest friends of the Catholic priest. Dr. Mouritz described the partnership of the two men and how they greeted new arrivals "steaming hot coffee and warm food". Their friendship lasted until the latter's death in 1889 and Hutchison was possibly one of the eight pallbearers at his funeral. Hutchison noted:

There was nothing supernatural about Father Damien. He was a vigorous, forceful and impellent man with a big kindly heart in the prime of life and a jack of all trades, carpenter, mason, baker, farmer, medico and nurse, grave digger ... He was that type of man of action, bull headed, strong will high minded ... of determined tenacity to attain results of his aspiration, but of kindly disposition toward all who came into contact with him ... I loved to work with him in his crusade to put down evil for his quality of open heartedness. There was no hypocrisy about him.

Around 1930, Hutchison started writing In Memory of Reverend Father Damien J. De Veuster and Other Priests Who Have Labored in the Leper Settlement of Kalawao, Molokaʻi', his personal account of Father Damien's work on the island and a memoir of his own fifty-three year of experience living on Kalaupapa. It was discovered unpublished at the time of his death. Hutchison died on July 17, 1932, at the age of seventy-six, from an attack of influenza pneumonia. After his death, the unfinished manuscript was sent to the Sacred Hearts Archives in Leuven, Belgium for storage. Portions of the memoirs, an unfinished will and his other writings are stored at the Hawaii State Archives. According to historian Anwei Skinsnes Law, "despite all his accomplishments and influence, Ambrose Hutchison had been largely left out of his own history."

== Personal life ==
Hutchison married Mary Kaiakonui, a local resident of Kalaupapa, in 1881, in a ceremony blessed by Father Damien. According to historian John Tayman, Mary may have also contracted leprosy and they had a daughter who did not have the same infection as her parents. Other sources claimed they were childless. They lived at Hutchison's house, in a part of the settlement called Makanalua. Kaiakonui cared for her husband as his mea kōkua (caregiver) until her death on May 16, 1905, at the age of forty-seven. She was buried in the Catholic section of Papaloa Cemetery and a white bronze grave monument marks her final resting place. His brother's descendants believe that he could be buried next to his wife. Members of his family were present at the 2009 canonization of Father Damien in Rome.

In his incomplete will, Hutchison expressed his love for his mother, his wife and the dwindling Hawaiian race:

For the love and affection I hold for my mother, Maria Mo-a, and Maria Kaiakonui, my wife (deceased), who were of the pure Hawaiian aboriginal ancestry, from whom sprung from and hold dear and my heart longing desire to perpetuate their race from extinction which forecasting shadow of time forbode their doom, which only the power of a mercifull and all loving God can stay, from the evident fate which await them and leaving firm faith in the love and mercy of God, who alone can save and perpetuate and multiply from being effaced from the land, which, by His grace he gave to their forefathers and foremothers and their descendants as a heritage forever and to this end and purpose, I consecrate my worldly estate both real, personal or mixed.

== Bibliography ==
- Inglis, Kerri A. (2013). Ma'i Lepera: A History of Leprosy in Nineteenth-Century Hawai'i. Honolulu, HI: University of Hawaii Press. ISBN 978-0-8248-6579-5.
- Law, Anwei Skinsnes (2012). Kalaupapa: A Collective Memory (Ka Hokuwelowelo). Honolulu: University of Hawaii Press. ISBN 978-0-8248-6580-1. OCLC 830023588.
- Moblo, Pennie (June 1999). "Ethnic Intercession: Leadership at the Kalaupapa Leprosy Colony". Pacific Studies. 22 (2). Laie, HI: Brigham Young University: 27–69. OCLC 882697672. Archived from the original on September 23, 2016.
- Mouritz, Arthur Albert St. M. (1916). "The Path of the Destroyer": A History of Leprosy in the Hawaiian Islands and Thirty Years Research Into the Means by which it Has Been Spread. Honolulu: Press: Honolulu Star-Bulletin, Ltd. OCLC 14801226.
- Tayman, John (2010). The Colony: The Harrowing True Story of the Exiles of Molokai. New York: Simon and Schuster. ISBN 978-1-4165-5192-8. OCLC 865230373.
