= Neglected tropical diseases in India =

Neglected tropical diseases in India are a group of bacterial, parasitic, viral, and fungal infections that are common in low income countries but receive little funding to address them. Neglected tropical diseases are common in India.

India's population is about 1.3 billion as of 2018, which is the second largest in the world. However, high population does not explain the greater frequency of neglected tropical diseases in India in comparison to other countries. Neglected tropical diseases in India occur in areas of both urban and rural poverty.

The neglected tropical diseases which affect India the most include ascariasis, hookworm infection, trichuriasis, dengue fever, lymphatic filariasis, trachoma, melioidosis, cysticercosis, leprosy, echinococcosis, visceral leishmaniasis, and rabies.

== List ==
Various organizations will include different diseases under the umbrella term of "neglected tropical diseases," but most diseases listed as such occur in tropical climates, lack global public attention, and have high infection rates. The World Health Organization recognizes 20 neglected tropical diseases, of which 12 are present in India.

- Protozoan infections
  - Leishmaniasis
- Helminth infections
  - Taeniasis/Cysticercosis
  - Dracunculiasis (Guinea-worm disease)
  - Echinococcosis
  - Lymphatic filariasis
  - Soil-transmitted helminthiases
- Viral infections
  - Dengue
  - Rabies
- Bacterial infections
  - Leprosy (Hansen's disease)
  - Trachoma
  - Melioidosis
- Fungal infections
  - Mycetoma, chromoblastomycosis, and other deep mycoses
- Ectoparasitic infections
  - Scabies and other ectoparasites
- Others
  - Snakebite envenoming

== Protozoan ==
=== Visceral leishmaniasis (kala-azar) ===
India has a goal for the elimination of kala-azar. The steps to eliminating the disease include passive and active case detection, early diagnosis and treatment, and vector control integrated into medical treatment.

Before the year 2000 there was hope and expectation that India could eliminate kala-azar from the country. In those years there were various programs to continue usual treatments and develop new ones. Around year 2000 there were reports that parasites which cause kala-azar had developed drug resistance to pentavalent antimonial, which was the popular drug for treating this disease for the last 50 years. The disease spread to become a problem again and now more difficult to treat. In poorer areas of India underreporting of the disease was a problem, allowing the disease to spread. The newer treatments of that time were expensive.

The treatment of kala-azar in India since about year 2000 has been difficult. In 2017 the Indian government had contained kala-azar in certain regions with the goal of providing easy access to medical treatment to eliminate it from the country. The intent was that by 2020 the disease should be very uncommon and also should never spread or grow again. Physicians use a drug to treat kala-azar both before and after the patient seems cured, but take care to use a safe amount. The work that health agencies in India have done to reduce kala-azar are learning models for India or any other country to apply to other public health programs to eliminate infectious disease.

=== African trypanosomiasis ===
African trypanosomiasis (sleeping sickness) is not a problem in India. Researchers do monitor watching for the disease. In 2005, an Indian farmer became ill following an unusual infection with an Indian species of this parasite called Trypanosoma evansi.

=== Chagas disease ===
Chagas disease is not a problem in India. Chagas disease, like African trypanosomiasis, has a Trypanosoma parasite as its cause. This parasite is not in India.

== Worms ==
=== Soil-transmitted helminthiasis ===
Soil-transmitted helminthiasis is a group of various parasitic diseases which different roundworms cause. The large roundworm causes Ascariasis, the hookworm causes Hookworm infection, and the whipworm causes Trichuriasis. These worms are related and there are strategies for prevention which apply to all of them. The World Health Organization estimated that in 2015, 75% of the children in India who had Soil-transmitted helminthiasis also got treatment.

=== Lymphatic filariasis ===
India has 40% of the world's lymphatic filariasis (LF) cases. For the patient, one of the major costs of treating the disease is having to take a lot of time off work. A year 2000 survey reported that about half of the people in India were at risk of contracting LF. Men and women can get this disease equally, but in the past, there have been barriers to women accessing treatment in the normal way.

In 1955 the Indian government established the National Filaria Control Programme to reduce LF. In 1997 India joined a World Health Assembly resolution to eliminate LF by 2020. In India to achieve this goal healthcare must be very accessible to almost everyone at risk for the disease. In 2015 the Indian government launched a health campaign called Hathipaon Mukt Bharat (Filaria Free India) to encourage public participation in eliminating LF.

Following some missed deadlines in 2015 and before a 2020 target date for eliminating LF, various media outlets discussed how India might meet the goal or what it should happen next if more time is required.

The Ayurvedic text Sushruta Samhita described lymphatic filariasis.

=== Echinococcosis ===
Echinococcosis is a parasitic disease of tapeworms.

=== Cysticercosis ===
Taeniasis and cysticercosis are both parasitic diseases caused by tapeworms in the family Taeniidae.

=== Eliminated – guinea worm ===
Guinea-worm disease was a neglected tropical disease in India until 2000 when it was eradicated. In 2006 India announced the eradication of yaws after going since 2003 with no reported cases of the disease.

=== Foodborne trematode infection ===
Foodborne trematode infection is not a problem in India.

From 1969 to 2012 there have only been a few reports of a few people in India getting fasciolosis (foodborne trematode infection). The disease is endemic among cows, buffalo, sheep, and goats in India. A 2012 paper which reported two human infections urged for attention that human infection might be more prevalent.

=== Onchocerciasis ===
Onchocerciasis (river blindness) is not a problem in India.

Onchocerciasis has been found in India in an unusual case.

=== Schistosomiasis ===
Schistosomiasis is not a problem in India.

A 2015 report described that while India has no routine reports of schistosomiasis, the disease might be present and unreported. A 1952 paper described the disease present in an Indian village and how WHO investigators treated the disease and tried to identify its source. In retrospect, that older paper was unusual, and either this disease is uncommon in India or difficult to detect.

== Fungus ==
=== Mycetoma ===
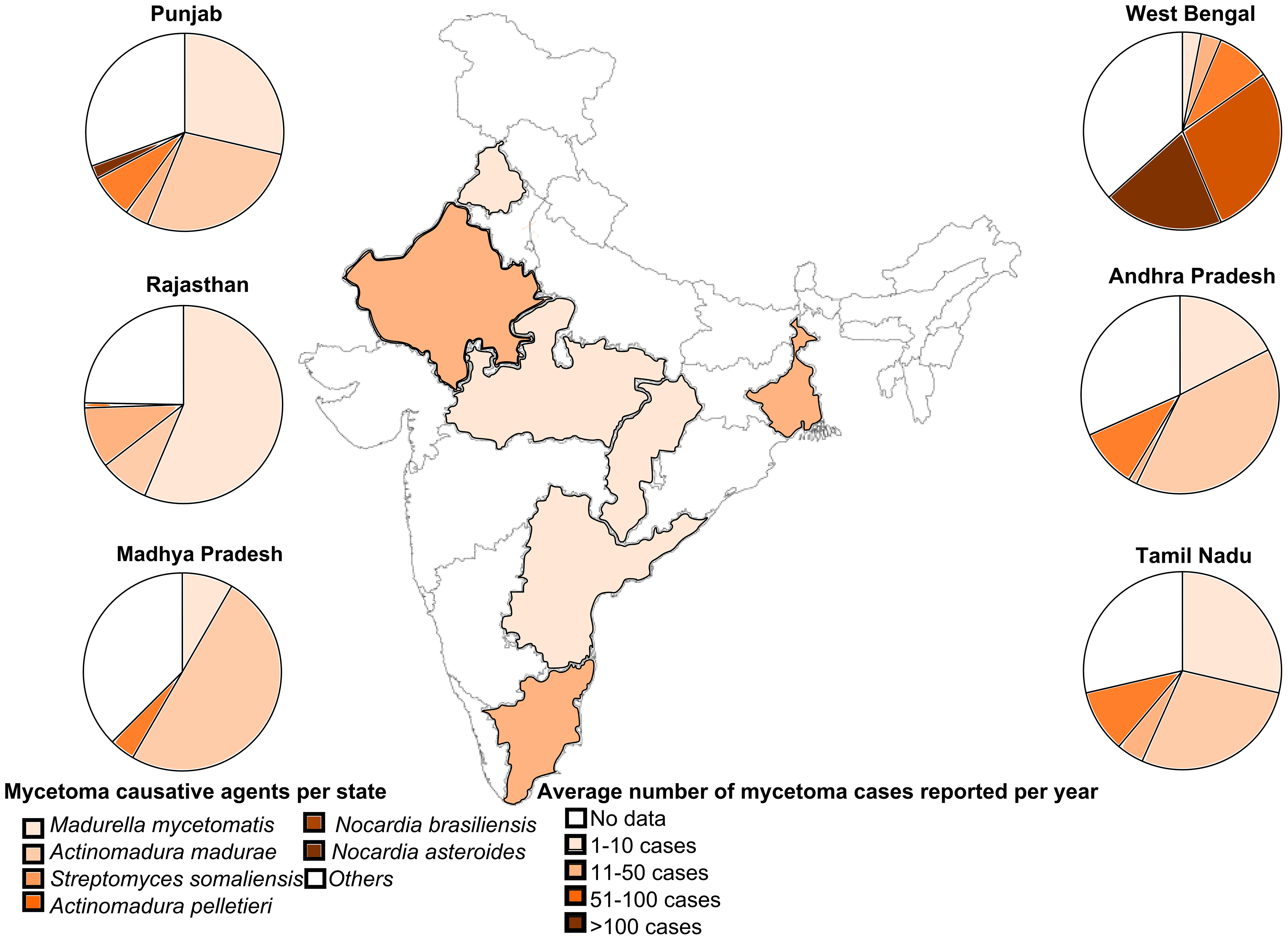
location, cause, and number of cases of mycetoma in India in 2013

Mycetoma is an infection under the skin which in India may have either a fungus or a bacterium as cause. In Rajasthan the cause is usually a fungus, but elsewhere in India a bacterium usually causes the disease.

Small health surveys have shown that mycetoma is common in central India.

The disease is difficult to treat. The treatment for fungus will not work on the bacteria and vice versa. When it is a bacterium the treatment period is long.

In 1874 Henry Vandyke Carter, a British surgeon, wrote a book titled On mycetoma, or the fungus disease of India.

== Bacteria ==
=== Leprosy ===
From 1983 until 2005 India organized successful programs to eliminate leprosy as a public health problem. While these programs reduced the number of people in India with leprosy from 58 in 10,000 to 1 in 10,000, they did not eliminate leprosy entirely. Completely eliminating the disease is possible in the near future. The National Leprosy Eradication Program is part of the government solution to ending the disease.

Without health intervention, it is possible that leprosy rates could rise and all the progress could be lost.

A 2018 study reported that India does well at detecting leprosy in poor areas, but more often misses cases in places with more money.

A 2019 report described how newly available technology should make detecting and treating leprosy in India more easy.

=== Trachoma ===
In December 2017 the health minister of India announced that India was free of trachoma. This announcement included a statement that there were no children in India who had an active case of trachoma.

A 2011 paper had speculated that India could eliminate trachoma within 10 years.

=== Yaws ===
The Indian government began programs to eliminate yaws in the 1950s. India began its Yaws Eradication Program in 1996 and identified 735 cases at its start. In 2004 the Indian government announced that the health program seemed to have eliminated the disease. Even after yaws seemed to be gone, the government continued monitoring and searching for cases heavily through 2006. Following that, there was a program to investigate rumors of yaws through 2011.

In May 2016 the World Health Organization declared India free of yaws. India was the first country where yaws was endemic and which eliminated it. This success in India led to excite for other countries to also try to eliminate yaws by year 2020 using techniques which India developed.

=== Buruli ulcer ===
Buruli ulcer is not a problem in India.

In 2019 physicians identified a case of Buruli ulcer in India, but the patient was from Nigeria where the disease is present.

== Viruses ==
=== Dengue fever and chikungunya fever ===
The WHO groups dengue and chikungunya fever together, but these are separate conditions.

India had chikungunya cases before 1973 when the disease was nearly eliminated. In 2005 India got another case of this. Checkungunya cases are rising in India

=== Rabies ===
Rabies has been a problem in India since ancient times. Rabies often comes from dog bites.

In India there are many stray dogs and many people report being bitten by them. To determine whether someone requires treatment for rabies or only treatment for the bite, the physician should have information about the incidence of rabies in animals in the area. In India about 2% of people who are bitten get a rabies vaccine. A 2012 paper argued that there was now enough information about rabies in India to plan to contain and prevent the disease nationally.

For people in India who get rabies the death rate is nearly 100%.

== Other ==
=== Scabies ===
Incidence of scabies in India ranges from 13 to 59% throughout observed areas. Little research exists on how much this condition affects Indian people's work, leisure, and sleep.

Various epidemiological studies exist reporting the number of people in India with scabies in various times and places.

Topical Permethrin and oral ivermectin are commonly available in India for treatment.

=== Snakebites ===
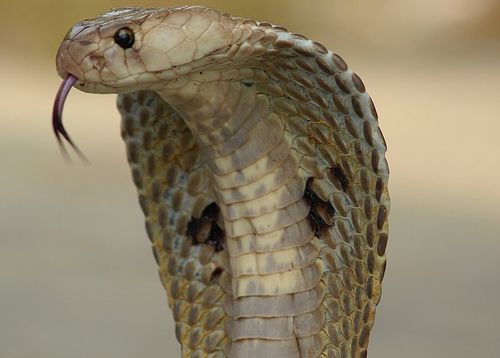
Indian cobra bites are a serious problem.

The envenomation is the danger of the snakebite, and not the bite itself. The four snakes in India which account for most bites are the Indian cobra, common krait, Russell's viper, and saw-scaled viper. Besides these four there are various other snakes which bite enough to require an organized medical response.

In May 2018 the World Health Organization declared that responding to snake bites is a global health priority.

Some places in India use traditional folk medicine with plants to treat snakebite.

Designing antivenom is a challenge because different snakes require different antivenom to treat, and there are many types of snakes in India.

97% of snake bites occur in rural areas.

Snakes have a special place in Indian society and culture. Because of this, many people who receive a snakebite treat their illness with less medical urgency than they would some other disease.

A 2010 review of snake bite in India found that there is underreporting of the problem and also insufficient health care treatment available.

A 1954 study tracked snake bites since 1940. This study estimated 300,000-400,000 bites a year with 10% of those being deadly.

Treatment which should be available but which are sometimes hard to get includes a whole blood clotting test and a venom detection kit.

== Epidemiology ==
India and South Asia have about half of the world's cases of kala azar, lymphatic filariasis, and leprosy. The region also has about a third of rabies deaths and a quarter of the South Asia, in addition to one-third of the rabies deaths, one-quarter of the intestinal helminth infections. As of 2014 there was not good information about dengue and Japanese encephalitis, but these diseases are a major burden in India also.

Of the 17 neglected tropical diseases which the World Health Organization recognized in 2017, six are common in India. Those 6 diseases are Lymphatic filariasis, kala-azar (Visceral leishmaniasis), Leptospirosis, Rabies, Soil-transmitted helminthiasis, and Dengue fever.

The Global Burden of Disease Study is a regularly updated report which attempts to describe the extent to which each major disease in the world affects individuals with those diseases. This report identifies surprising problems and described them to be unknown among many health professionals. One surprising finding of the 2016 Global Burden of Disease study is that India has the most and worst cases of 11 of the 16 neglected tropical diseases it considered. India has the most cases of all neglected tropical diseases which occur in India.

New cases of neglected tropical diseases in 2016
neglected tropical disease	Cases in India	Total cases globally	India's percent of global total	India's incidence rank
Ascariasis	222 million	799 million	28%	1
Hookworm infection	102 million	451 million	23%	1
Trichuriasis	68 million	435 million	16%	1
Dengue fever^{*}	53 million	101 million	53%	1
Lymphatic filariasis	8.7 million	29.4 million	29%	1
Trachoma^{†}	1.8 million	3.3 million	53%	1
Cysticercosis	819,538	2.7 million	31%	1
Leprosy	187,730	523,245	36%	1
Echinococcosis	119,320	973,662	12%	1
Visceral leishmaniasis	13,530	30,067	45%	1
Rabies^{*}	4,370	13,340	33%	1

* – only new cases
† – only cases causing visual impairment

== Prevention ==
Elimination of as many of these diseases as possible is a goal.

The government of India collaborates with the World Health Organization in making financial investments in health care for the purpose of reducing and eliminating neglected tropical diseases in India.

In 2005, the Indian Health Ministry, Bangladeshi Health Ministry, and the Nepali Health Ministry shared a memorandum of understanding to eliminate kala-azar in their shared region by 2015.

A 2015 study reported that India's public health programs were reducing leprosy rates but not quickly enough to eliminate the disease from the region.

In 2017 the Indian government began participating in the World Health Organization's plan to eliminate 10 of the neglected tropical diseases. The government strategy was to reduce poverty, promote sanitation, do vector control, and provide public health education.

== Climate Change ==
=== Impact of Climate Change on Neglected Tropical Diseases in India ===
Climate change is emerging as a significant driver of the changes in the spread of neglected tropical diseases in India, particularly those that are vector-borne or linked to environmental conditions. India, with its diverse climate zones and large population, faces increased risks due to rising temperatures, erratic rainfall, and changing weather patterns. These environmental changes influence the distribution, transmission dynamics, and seasonal patterns of various neglected tropical diseases, affecting their burden on vulnerable populations.

=== Vector-Borne Neglected Tropical Diseases and Climate Change ===
==== Lymphatic Filariasis ====
Vector-borne neglected tropical diseases, such as lymphatic filariasis, are particularly sensitive to climate variations, most notably temperature. This is because of how this warming of temperature influences the vector of this disease, the Anopheles mosquito. As temperatures increase, these mosquitos can introduce lymphatic filariasis to new areas that were previously too cold. Through these mosquitoes reaching new areas, some ecological models show that the case burden of lymphatic filariasis will increase.

==== Chikungunya Virus ====
Chikungunya, on the other hand, may see a decrease in cases across India due to climate change. The relation of climate change to the ideal environment of the vector, the Aedes mosquito, is driving this change. This is because climate change models predict that some areas of India will become less habitable for this mosquito while others will remain equally suitable for the Aedes mosquito.

=== Summary ===
Climate change has mixed effects on the diseases listed above. The need for concern of India for the impacts of climate change on its health has been previously discussed, and vector-borne Neglected Tropical Diseases will be one of these impacts.

== Society and culture ==
The neglected tropical diseases are diseases of poverty and poverty reduction in society will reduce them.

Some people feel embarrassed to have a disease, but a disease is not anyone's fault. The government of India sometimes has organized health campaigns to teach about diseases so that people feel comfortable coming for medical help when they need it.
