= P. K. Gopal =

Indian social worker (born 1941)

- Born: 13 May 1941 (age 85); Erode, Tamil Nadu, India
- Education: Loyola College, Chennai
- Occupation: Social worker
- Years active: since 1970
- Awards: Padma Shri; National Rehabilitation Award; Erwin Stindl Memorial Oration Award; Best Social Worker Award; Wellesley Bailey Award; AIFO Award; FESCO Award; Sumanahalli Life Time Achievement Award; Nippon Foundation
- Website: Official web site

P. K. Gopal is an Indian social worker and a co-founder of International Association for Integration, Dignity and Economic Advancement (IDEA), an international advocacy group, known for his services towards eradication of leprosy, especially in India. He was honored by the Government of India, in 2012, with the fourth highest Indian civilian award of Padma Shri.

== Early life and education ==
P. K. Gopal, hailing from a Sengunthar weavers' family, was born on 13 May 1941 in the Erode district of the South Indian state of Tamil Nadu. He graduated in Economics from Erode and moved to Chennai to secure his master's degree in Medical Social Work, in 1970, from Loyola College. While in college, he contracted leprosy and was treated for two years.

== Work ==
His career started by joining the Sacred Heart Hospital, Kumbakonam where he worked for 25 years. During his stint there, he is reported to have established a rehabilitation centre, known to be the first of its kind in India, for the leprosy-affected people of the region. He is credited with the rehabilitation of over 3000 such patients. The experience also helped him to do his own research in the area which earned him a doctoral degree from Ranchi University, in social science, in 1994.

Gopal attended the Leprosy Conference held in Brazil in 1994, where the International Association for Integration Dignity and Advancement (IDEA) was formed. In 1997, Gopal started IDEA India, the Indian arm of the global NGO, which is known to have rehabilitated 600 leprosy-affected people and provided education to over 6000 children. The organization works for the socio-economic rehabilitation of the patients and on human rights related issues. Gopal has been associated with Yohei Sasakawa, the Chairman of Nippon Foundation, and together they are reported to have succeeded in passing a resolution at the United Nations Human Rights Council in 2003 towards ending discrimination against leprosy-affected people. United Nations General Assembly adopted the resolution on 21 March 2011. He is also credited with a 2006–2007 survey, under the aegis of IDEA India, to identify and document the leprosy homes in India, a survey which brought to light 850 leprosy colonies in the country. He is also a collaborator of WHO on leprosy related issues.

Gopal has authored a book, Guidelines for Socio-Economic Rehabilitation on the rehabilitation of leprosy-affected people and has published articles on the subject. He is an elected member of the Medico-Social Commission of the International Federation of Anti-Leprosy Associations (ILEP) and the Technical Resources Group of the Director General of Health Services, a Government of India agency. He also serves as a board member of the International Leprosy Association, USA and is the president of the National Forum of Persons Affected by Leprosy.

== Awards and recognitions ==
During his tenure at Sacred Heart Hospital, Gopal received the Best Social Worker award from Loyoloa College, Chennai, in 1984. Two years later in 1986, he was selected by the Government of India for the National Award for the Best Rehabilitation Officer. The Erwin Stindl Memorial Oration award came his way in 1995, followed by the Wellesley Bailey award (London) and the Associazione Italiana Amici di Raoul Follereau (AIFO) award (Italy) in 2001. He received the Nippon Foundation award in 2004 and the FESCO award (Japan) was conferred on him in 2005. The Government of India included him in the 2012 Republic Day honours for the award of Padma Shri, and the Sumanahalli Organization, Karnataka followed the national award with their Life Time Achievement Award, the same year.

== See also ==
- Leprosy
- Leprosy in India
