= Arthur Albert St. Mouritz =

British physician (1861–1943)

Arthur Albert St. Maur Mouritz
- Born: 1861
- Died: 1943 (aged 81–82)
- Known for: Leprosy research

Arthur Albert St. Maur Mouritz, often credited as A. Mouritz, (1861–1943) was a British physician known for his studies of leprosy in Hawaii. He travelled from England to Hawaii in 1883, and was the resident physician to the Kalaupapa Leper Settlement in Molokai, Hawaii, from 1884 to 1887 or 1888. He found evidence that there were cases of leprosy in Hawaii before 1830.

Mouritz studied how leprosy was spread through experiments on hundreds of native Hawaiians. He and his colleagues received international and long-standing notoriety for their infamous experimental inoculation of leprosy into apparently healthy people. To justify his experiments, Mouritz stated that Hawaiians were the only race not disgusted by leprosy symptoms.

Mouritz's research revealed that leprosy was less contagious than previously thought. He concluded that leprosy could not be spread by insects, casual proximity or inoculation, but only be spread to a healthy person by exposing the mucosa of the digestive tract to the leprosy bacteria. (Note: It is now believed that leprosy is mainly spread by prolonged exposure to respiratory droplets containing the bacteria.) He posed that the bacteria summoned a fermentogen that was only available in susceptible humans, which fed the leprosy. Instead of being moved to free the residents of the isolated leper colony so they could return home to their communities, he justified keeping them confined because he was disgusted by their ugliness.

Mouritz wrote the first American book on Hawaiian leprosy, and later wrote a book about the history of leprosy. He practised medicine for at least 40 years. After leaving Hawaii, he returned to explain the world history of influenza from 1120 B.C. to 1919 A.D., and its causes and treatments. His book The Flu is included in the Surgeon General's Library at the U. S. National Library of Medicine.

== See also ==
- Kalaupapa National Historical Park
- Father Damien
- Leper colony stigma
- History of leprosy
- Pandemic
