= Bottle House Block =

- U.S. National Register of Historic Places
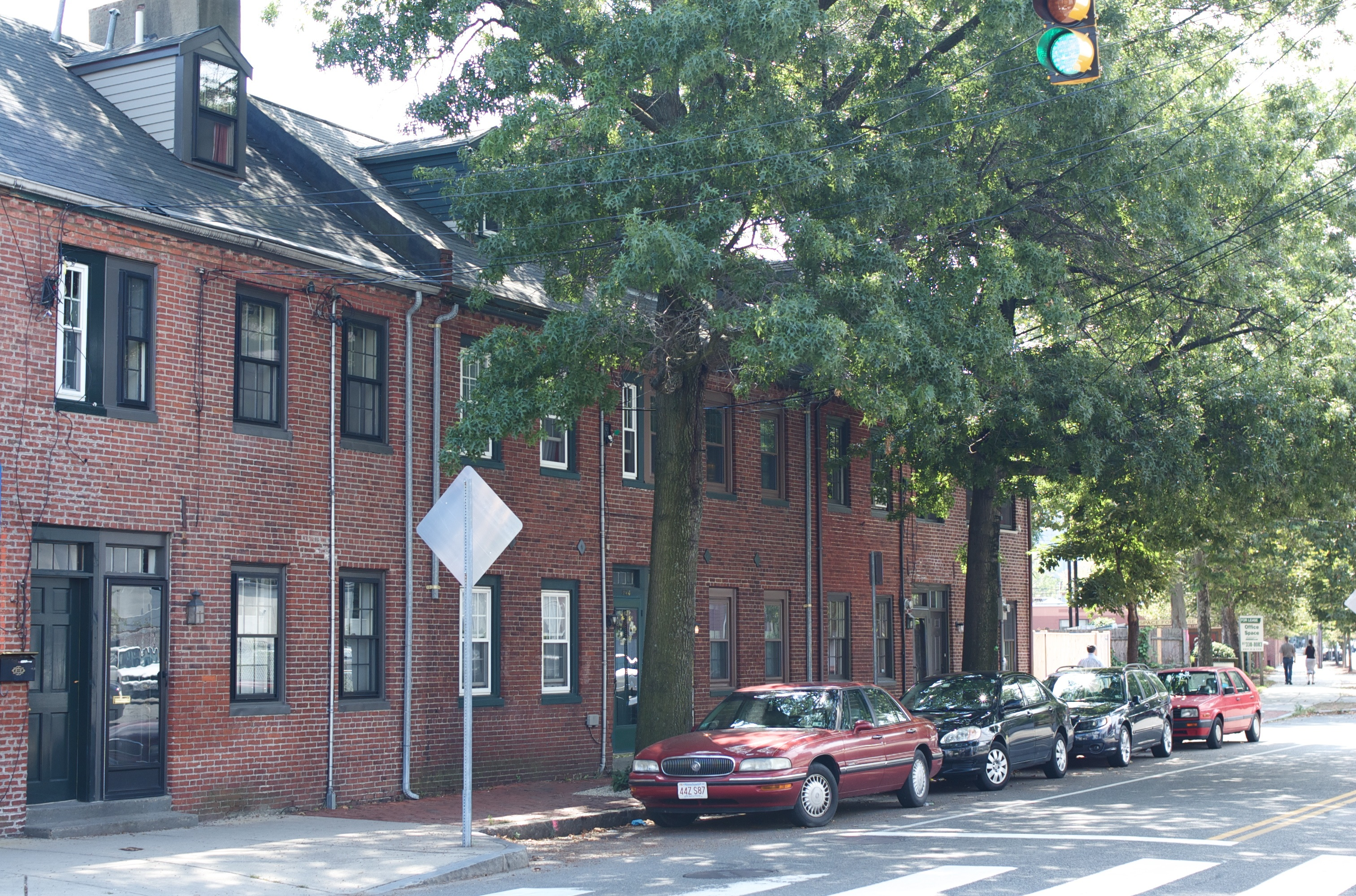

- Location within Massachusetts Location within the United States
- Location: 204–214 3rd Street, Cambridge, Massachusetts
- Coordinates: 42°22′02.9″N 71°04′52.2″W
- Built: 1826
- Architectural style: Georgian, Federal
- MPS: Cambridge MRA
- NRHP reference No.: 82001924
- Added to NRHP: April 13, 1982

The Bottle House Block is a brick rowhouse in Cambridge, Massachusetts. It was built in 1826 as a tavern by Deming Jarves, owner of the New England Glass Company, and was identified as the "Bottle House Block" from its earliest days. The building is the third oldest in East Cambridge and one of a few surviving brick buildings in Cambridge from that period. At the time of its construction it stood on the main road from the West Boston Bridge to Old Cambridge (roughly Harvard Square).

The building was listed on the National Register of Historic Places in 1982.

== See also ==
- National Register of Historic Places listings in Cambridge, Massachusetts
