= Leprosy in China =

Health issue in China

Leprosy was said to be first recognized in the ancient civilizations of China, Egypt, and India, according to the World Health Organization (WHO). Leprosy, also known as Hansen's disease, was officially eliminated at the national level in China by 1982, meaning prevalence is lower than 1 in 100,000. There are 3,510 active cases today. Though leprosy has been brought under control in general, the situation in some areas is worsening, according to China's Ministry of Health. In the past, leprosy sufferers were ostracized by their communities as the disease was incurable, disfiguring, and wrongly thought to be highly infectious.

== Epidemiology ==
=== Numbers ===
500,000 cases of leprosy were registered in China between 1950 and 2002. Most of these sufferers have been cured but approximately 6,000 active cases remain today and about 2,000 new cases are detected and registered every year. Many more cases are not registered, partly through ignorance, but also because of the stigma associated with the disease. The number of cases reported has varied over time, with the number of cases declining between 1985 and 1993 but staying flat between 1994 and 2001.

There are estimates that show that there are 200,000 people in China today who have recovered from the disease but more than half (110,000) are disabled due to the disease, with conditions ranging from blindness to disfigurement. Although these former leprosy sufferers were cured in the last 50 years, many of them still suffer serious pain and difficulties because of these disabilities/deformities and the stigma. This social stigma has become the main problem in leprosy diagnosis and treatment, today.

=== Areas affected ===
Mostly, cases of infection remain in impoverished parts in the southwestern provinces of Yunnan, Guizhou, and Sichuan, and Tibet in the west and Hunan in the south. Other provinces/municipalities affected on a smaller scale, are Anhui, Qinghai, Chongqing, Guangdong, and Shaanxi.

=== Transmission and pathology ===
Contrary to popular belief, leprosy ranks low in terms of infectiousness and is not congenital. It is passed via respiratory droplets among people in close and prolonged contact. The transmission rate is low and 95 percent of people are naturally immune to it. Caused by the bacterium Mycobacterium leprae, leprosy affects the skin, mucous membranes, peripheral nerves, and eyes. As nerve damage is permanent, even those who have recovered cannot feel pain. Minor cuts and abrasions on fingers and toes often turn into gaping, inflamed ulcers because of unsanitary living conditions. These open sores overrun the digits, which slowly shrink and many sufferers end up with stumps. Some have legs amputated.

== Treatment ==
In China, dapsone was used from 1946 to treat leprosy, but treatment of the disease took a leap in 1982 with the introduction of a largely successful multidrug therapy (MDT) using dapsone, rifampicin, and clofazimine. Today, therapy takes six months to a year. MDT treatment has been made available by the WHO free of charge to all patients worldwide since 1995, and provides a simple yet highly effective cure for all types of leprosy. If diagnosed and treated early, the disease leaves no traces. But in some places in China, stigma still surrounds the disease and victims do not seek treatment until it is too late.

== Stigma ==
In current-day China, leprosy is strongly associated with poverty and stigma remains a significant barrier to effective treatment.

== See also ==
- Health in China
- Leprosy
- Leper colony
