= Coins of the Hawaiian dollar =

In 1847, the Kingdom of Hawaiʻi, under the reign of King Kamehaheha III, issued its first official coinage—a large one-cent copper penny—to alleviate the chronic shortage of small denomination coins circulating in the Hawaiian Islands. The next and last official coinage of the Hawaiian Islands was minted in 1883, by King Kalākaua I; however during the intervening period, the changing needs of the Hawaiian Islands were met by circulating private-issued tokens and the coins of the United States of America.

The following is a list of known coins and tokens issued by the Kingdom of Hawaiʻi and various business concerns during the period of 1847 through 1891. The referenced catalog numbers used in this article are from the book, Hawaiian Money: Standard Catalog: Second Edition, 1991 by Donald Medcalf and Ronald Russell.

== Kingdom of the Hawaiian Islands ==
=== 1847 Kamehaheha III issue ===
==== Background ====
Keneta
The ill-fated Keneta was commissioned by King Kamehameha III. Coined money was in great demand in the Hawaiian Islands and was in continual shortage in the early nineteenth century. In response, King Kamehameha III devoted Chapter 4, Section 1 of the legal code of 1846 to the monetary system of the kingdom, tying it directly to that of the United States, thus normalizing the rate of transaction of small change in the islands and their corresponding values to United States money. Anticipating growing coined money needs, the legal code also outlined future Hawaiian coin designs.

Of the first coins decided to be acted upon was the Keneta—a copper coin valued at one cent of a U.S. dollar. As the Hawaiian Treasury was in shortage of funds during this period, the copper cent was seen as an initial "affordable" issue to be followed by other denominations at a later date. James Jackson Jarves, acting as agent for the Hawaiian Government, placed an order for 100,000 of these coins in 1846. He contracted Edward Hulseman—best known for his 1837 Half Cent token—to design and engrave the coin. It is not known precisely where the pieces were minted – although Walter Breen in Complete Encyclopedia of U.S. and Colonial Coins asserts that they were produced at the private mint of H. M. & E. I. Richards of Attleboro, Massachusetts; regardless, Jarves was given a note dated January 14, 1847 in the amount of $869.56 by the Minister of Finance as payment for the order.

On 3 May 1847 the merchant ship Montreal arrived in Honolulu after sailing from Boston via Rio de Janeiro, Cape Horn and Tahiti. The Keneta were part of the cargo delivered to the Minister of Finance. When the coins reached the public they proved a grave disappointment. There has been some claim that the denomination was misspelled "Hapa Haneri" instead of the correct "Hapa Hanele" (which translates to "part of a hundred" or loosely "one cent"). However, "Hapa Hanele" is a 20th-century spelling. The spelling "Haneri" was used throughout the 19th century, and also appears on the $100 and $500 bills issued during the reign of King Kalakaua. Reports of the time state that the King's portrait was unrecognizable. In addition, the Keneta also arrived worn or discolored by the humidity and bilge water of the Montreal, in whose hold they had spent many months. Local merchants, who were "against very small transactions," immediately voiced their objections to the coins; and the only general usage witnessed was by governors of the outer islands who used them as change when collecting duties and taxes.

The last known time of issue for the Keneta was in 1862, when 11,595 were still being held in the Treasury vault. Their legal tender status was removed in 1884, and in the following year 88,305 were sold as scrap and shipped out of the country.

The Keneta is about the same size as the United States Large Cent. The coin bears a bust of the king on the obverse surrounded by the legend "KAMEHAMEHA III. KA MOI." and the date 1847 below. The reverse has "HAPA HANERI" within a leafy wreath, tied with a bow at bottom, surrounded by "AUPUNI HAWAII." There are two different obverse varieties: one shows a Plain 4 in the date, while the other has a "Crosslet" 4 (with a vertical bar at the right end of the horizontal line). The Plain 4 is commonly known as the "Small Bust" type, while the Crosslet 4 is called the "Large Bust." There are also six separate varieties of reverse dies with the wreath displaying 13, 15, 17 or 18 berries, with 2CC-6 being the rarest followed by 2CC-1. Modern souvenir restrikes have been made, and have no value.

==== Technical Details ====
Keneta

- Mintage: Circulation strikes: 100,000 Proofs: None
- Designer: Edward Hulseman
- Diameter: ±27 millimeters
- Metal content: Copper: 100%
- Edge: Plain
- Mintmark: None (H. M. & E. I. Richards of Attleboro, Massachusetts?)
- Varieties: Plain and Crosslet 4

==== Medcalf & Russell numbers ====
- 2CC-1 HAPA HANELI (part of a hundred, one cent) 1847, Crosslet 4 (tunic laps over 4) - "Large Bust" rev. 18 berries (9x9)
- 2CC-2 HAPA HANELI (part of a hundred, one cent) 1847, Crosslet 4 (tunic laps over 4) - "Large Bust" rev. 15 berries (7x8)
- 2CC-3 HAPA HANELI (part of a hundred, one cent) 1847, Plain 4 (tunic laps over 7) - "Small Bust" rev. 17 berries (8x9)
- 2CC-4 HAPA HANELI (part of a hundred, one cent) 1847, Plain 4 (tunic laps over 7) - "Small Bust" rev. 15 berries (8x7)
- 2CC-5 HAPA HANELI (part of a hundred, one cent) 1847, Plain 4 (tunic laps over 7) - "Small Bust" rev. 13 berries (6x7)
- 2CC-6 HAPA HANELI (part of a hundred, one cent) 1847, Plain 4 (tunic laps over 7) - "Small Bust" rev. 15 berries (7x8)

=== 1881 Five Cent Pattern Issue ===
==== Background ====
5 Keneta

In 1881, on a trip around the world King Kalākaua I was approached in Vienna, Austria by officials representing the French and Belgian mints. These officials suggested that a national coinage be issued for his island kingdom. King Kalākaua I was pleased with the idea of independent coinage for his Kingdom that he ordered patterns for the new coin to be struck. A spelling mistake by the engraver substituted the word "Au" for "Ua" in the Kingdom of Hawaiʻi motto Ua Mau ke Ea o ka ʻĀina i ka Pono. 200 patterns with King Kalākaua I in profile were minted in Paris and forwarded to the king upon his return to his island kingdom. The subjects of the Kingdom of Hawaii did not approve of the new coin due to the misspelling of the Kingdom's motto. Many of these coins were subsequently destroyed or distributed among the friends of the king.

==== Medcalf & Russell numbers ====
- CN-1 KENETA (five cents) 1881 - nickel

=== 1883 Kalākaua I issues ===
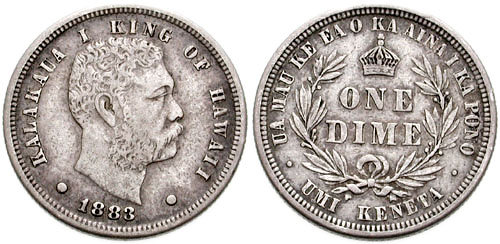
10 keneta ("one dime") coin of 1883.

These coins were minted in 1883-84 (all bearing the earlier date) at the San Francisco Mint, to American coinage standards and saw wide circulation on the islands. They were designed by Chief Engraver Charles E. Barber. Following American annexation in 1898 large numbers were withdrawn from circulation and melted.

trials

- CPC-1 HAPAWALU (eighth dollar) 1883 - copper trial
- CPC-2 HAPAHA (quarter dollar) 1883 - copper trial
- CPC-3 HAPALUA (half dollar) 1883 - copper trial
- CPC-4 AKAHI DALA (one dollar) 1883 - copper trial

official version

- CS-1 UMI KENETA (ten cents) 1883 - silver
- CS-2 HAPAWALU (eighth dollar) 1883 - silver
- CS-3 HAPAHA (quarter dollar) 1883 - silver
- CS-3a HAPAHA (quarter dollar) 1883, 8/3 inside 1883 - silver
- CS-4 HAPALUA (half dollar) 1883 - silver
- CS-5 AKAHI DALA (one dollar) 1883 - silver

Mintages of the Hawaiian coins, and the numbers melted by the United States government following their demonetization in 1903, are as follows:

- Umi Keneta: 250,000; Melted: 79.
- Hapaha: 500,000; Melted: 257,400.
- Hapalua: 700,000; Melted: 612,245.
- Akahi Dala: 500,000; Melted: 453,652.

In addition, 26 proof sets were made for presentation to dignitaries.

== Tokens ==
=== John T. Waterhouse ===
==== Background ====
John Thomas Waterhouse Token
The Waterhouse token is struck in white metal - a substance similar to pewter or plumbers putty. It is recognized as the earliest known Hawaiian token; although the use of the token and the date of issue is unclear. The firm of J. T. Waterhouse, established in 1851, were importers of dry goods in the 19th century; the firm is still active in several business enterprises today.

The obverse features a facing bust of Kamehameha III, though with the surrounding legend reading "HIS MAJESTY KAMEHAMEHA IV". The reverse shows a beehive in the center with the issuer's name at top and "HALE MAIKAI" - meaning house excellent, or a good place to do business - below. The token was known as hale meli in Hawaiian, recalling the beehive on the reverse.

==== Medcalf and Russell numbers ====
- 2TE-1 1855–1860 token - pewter

==== Gallery ====
Waterhouse token obverse

Waterhouse token reverse

=== Wailuku Plantation ===
- 2TE-2 obv. W.P. 12½ 1871
- 2TE-3 obv. W.P. 12½ 1871, wider pointed starfish
- 2TE-4 obv. W.P. VI (6½)
- 2TE-5 obv. W.P. VI, wider pointed starfish
- 2TE-6 obv. W.P. 1880, rev. 1RL
- 2TE-7 obv. W.P. 1880, rev. HALF REAL

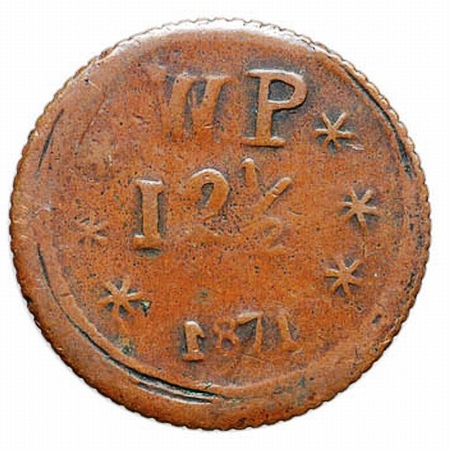
W.P. 12½ 1871 obverse (2TE-2)

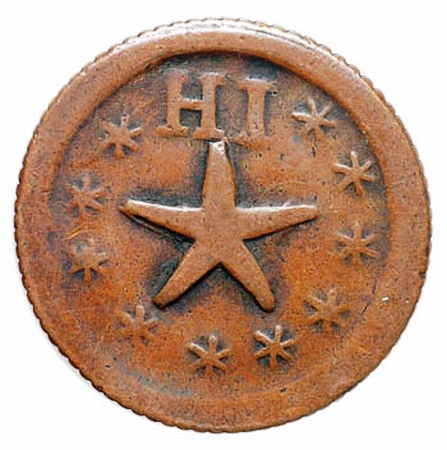
W.P. 12½ 1871 reverse (2TE-2)

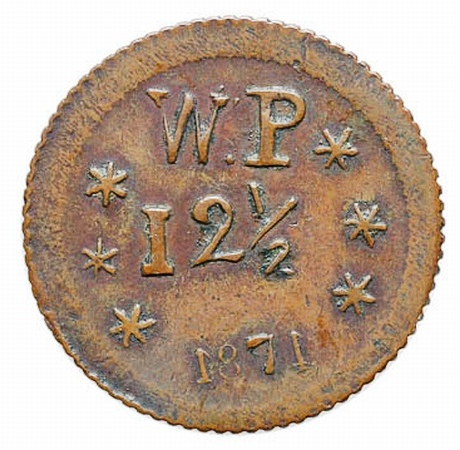
W.P. 12½ 1871 obverse (2TE-3)

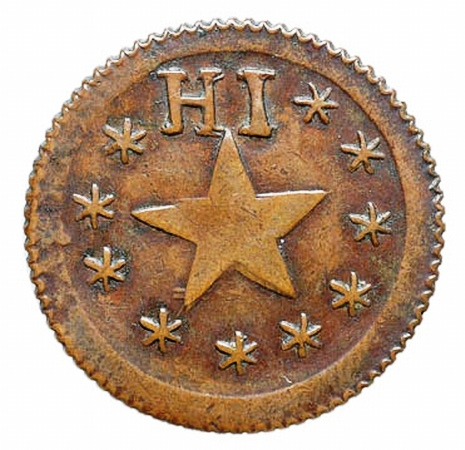
W.P. 12½ 1871 reverse (2TE-3)

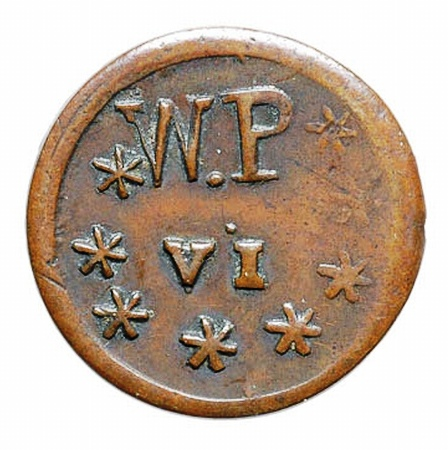
W.P. VI (6¼) obverse (2TE-5)

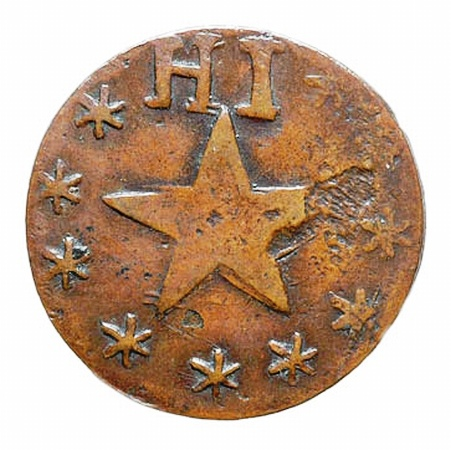
W.P. VI (6¼) reverse (2TE-5)

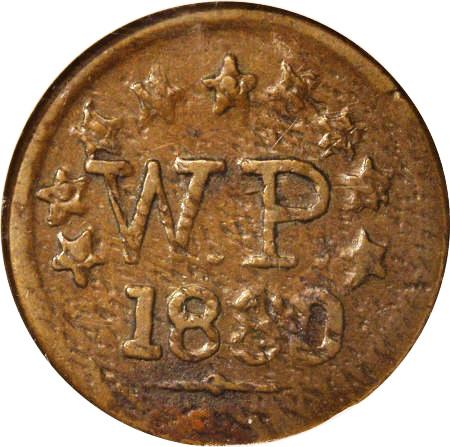
W.P. 1 Real 1880 obverse (2TE-6)

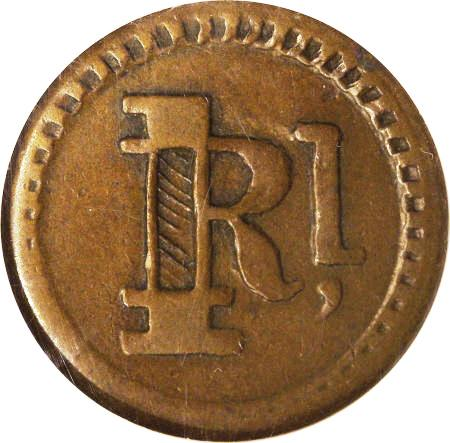
W.P. 1 Real 1880 reverse (2TE-6)

=== Kahului & Wailuku Railroad ===
- 2TE-8 obv. .T.H.H. 12½, rev. R.R. 1879
- 2TE-8a obv. .T.H.H. 12½, rev. R.R. 1879, thicker 2mm planchet
- 2TE-9 obv. T.H.H. 12½ no dot in front of "T", rev. two stars
- 2TE-10 obv. T.H.H. 25, rev. R.R. 1879

T.H.H. 12½ 1879 obverse (2TE-8)

T.H.H. 12½ 1879 reverse (2TE-8)

T.H.H. 25 1879 obverse (2TE-10)

T.H.H. 25 1879 reverse (2TE-10)

=== Kahului Railroad ===
- TE-9 10 Cents, 1891
- TE-10 15 Cents, 1891
- TE-11 20 Cents, 1891
- TE-12 25 Cents, 1891
- TE-13 35 Cents, 1891
- TE-14 75 Cents, 1891

=== Haiku Plantation ===
- TE-15 obv. HAIKU 1882, rev. ONE RIAL, reeded edge
- TE-15a same, except for plain edge

Haiku, One Real 1882 obverse (TE-15)

Haiku, One Real 1882 reverse (TE-15)

=== Grove Ranch Plantation ===
- TE-16 obv. G.R.P. 1886, rev. 12½
- TE-17 obv. G.R.P. 1887, rev. 12½

== See also ==
- Hawaiian dollar
- Hawaii Sesquicentennial half dollar
- James Jackson Jarves
