= Ferdinand William Hutchison =

British physician and politician in the Kingdom of Hawaii

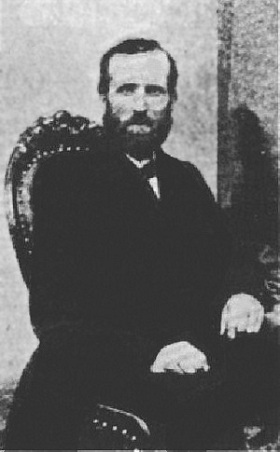

Minister of the Interior
- In office April 26, 1865 – January 10, 1873
- Preceded by: Charles Gordon Hopkins
- Succeeded by: Charles Reed Bishop

Personal details
- Born: c. 1819 Edinburgh, United Kingdom
- Died: May 20, 1893 (aged 74) Leichhardt, Sydney, New South Wales
- Spouse(s): Malie Moa, and others
- Children: Ambrose, Christina, William, and others

Ferdinand William Hutchison (c. 1819 – May 20, 1893) was a British physician and politician in the Kingdom of Hawaii who became a cabinet minister to King Kamehameha V. He was president of the Board of Health from 1868 to 1873 and was instrumental in the early development and management of the leper settlement of Kalaupapa. His surname is often misspelled as Hutchinson.

== Life ==
Son of British Royal Navy Captain George Hutchison, he was born in Edinburgh and where he received his MRCS. He arrived in Hawaii around the early 1850. Prior to his rise to political prominence, he worked as a surgeon, magistrate, circuit judge and founded a sugar mill and became a prominent plantation owner. During the reign of King Kamehameha V, he was appointed as court physician. In 1865, he was appointed to succeed Charles Gordon Hopkins as Minister of the Interior, a position he held until 1873. He served briefly as Minister of Foreign Affairs in 1872 and 1873 and was a member of the House of Nobles, the upper house of the legislature, from 1866 to 1872. Writing in 1866, Mark Twain described Hutchison:

He has sandy hair, sandy mustache, sandy complexion—is altogether one of the sandiest men I ever saw, so to speak: is a tall, stoop-shouldered, middle-aged, lowering-browed, intense-eyed, irascible man, and looks like he might have his little prejudices and partialities. He has got one good point, however — he don't talk.

Hutchison was also president of the Board of Health from 1868 to 1873 and was instrumental in the early development and management of the leper settlement of Kalaupapa on the island of Molokai. Previously as a board member, he had proposed the site as a place of exile after visiting the remote peninsula as a circuit judge. During his tenure as president, Hutchison adopted an economizing attitude to the conditions of the settlement and developed a bias toward the afflicted patients whom he regarded as amoral. One noted later exile was his own son Ambrose K. Hutchison, who was sent to the settlement on January 5, 1879, and became a superintendent of Kalaupapa from 1884 to 1897. His son never mentioned his father by name, possibly to shield him from the stigma of being related to a leper.

In the early 1850s, while working as a port physician in Lahaina, Ferdinand William Hutchison married Maria or Malie Moa, a Native Hawaiian woman, who was the first of three wives. They had three children: Ambrose K. Hutchison, William Hutchison and Christina Hutchison, who were given to relatives to be raised after their mother's death. His son William had eleven children including a son he named Ambrose Ferdinand after the child's uncle and grandfather. In 1875, Hutchison moved to Australia taking his daughter Christina with him. He died at his residence, in Leichhardt, Sydney on May 20, 1893, at the age of seventy-four, after a long illness.

== Bibliography ==
- Hawaii (1918). Lydecker, Robert Colfax (ed.). Roster Legislatures of Hawaii, 1841–1918. Honolulu: Hawaiian Gazette Company. OCLC 60737418.
- Inglis, Kerri A. (2013). Ma'i Lepera: A History of Leprosy in Nineteenth-Century Hawai'i. Honolulu, HI: University of Hawaii Press. ISBN 978-0-8248-6579-5 – via Project MUSE.
- Kuykendall, Ralph Simpson (1953). The Hawaiian Kingdom 1854–1874, Twenty Critical Years. Vol. 2. Honolulu: University of Hawaii Press. ISBN 978-0-87022-432-4. OCLC 47010821.
- Law, Anwei Skinsnes (2012). Kalaupapa: A Collective Memory (Ka Hokuwelowelo). Honolulu: University of Hawaii Press. ISBN 978-0-8248-6580-1. OCLC 830023588 – via Project MUSE.
- Osorio, Jon Kamakawiwoʻole (2002). Dismembering Lāhui: A History of the Hawaiian Nation to 1887. Honolulu: University of Hawaii Press. ISBN 0-8248-2549-7. OCLC 48579247.
- Tayman, John (2010). The Colony: The Harrowing True Story of the Exiles of Molokai. New York: Simon and Schuster. ISBN 978-1-4165-5192-8. OCLC 865230373.
- Twain, Mark (1975). Day, Arthur Grove (ed.). Mark Twain's Letters from Hawaii. Pacific Classics, no. 5. Honolulu: University of Hawaii Press. ISBN 978-0-8248-0288-2. OCLC 1121242.
