= The Polynesian =

Honolulu weekly newspaper (1840–1864)

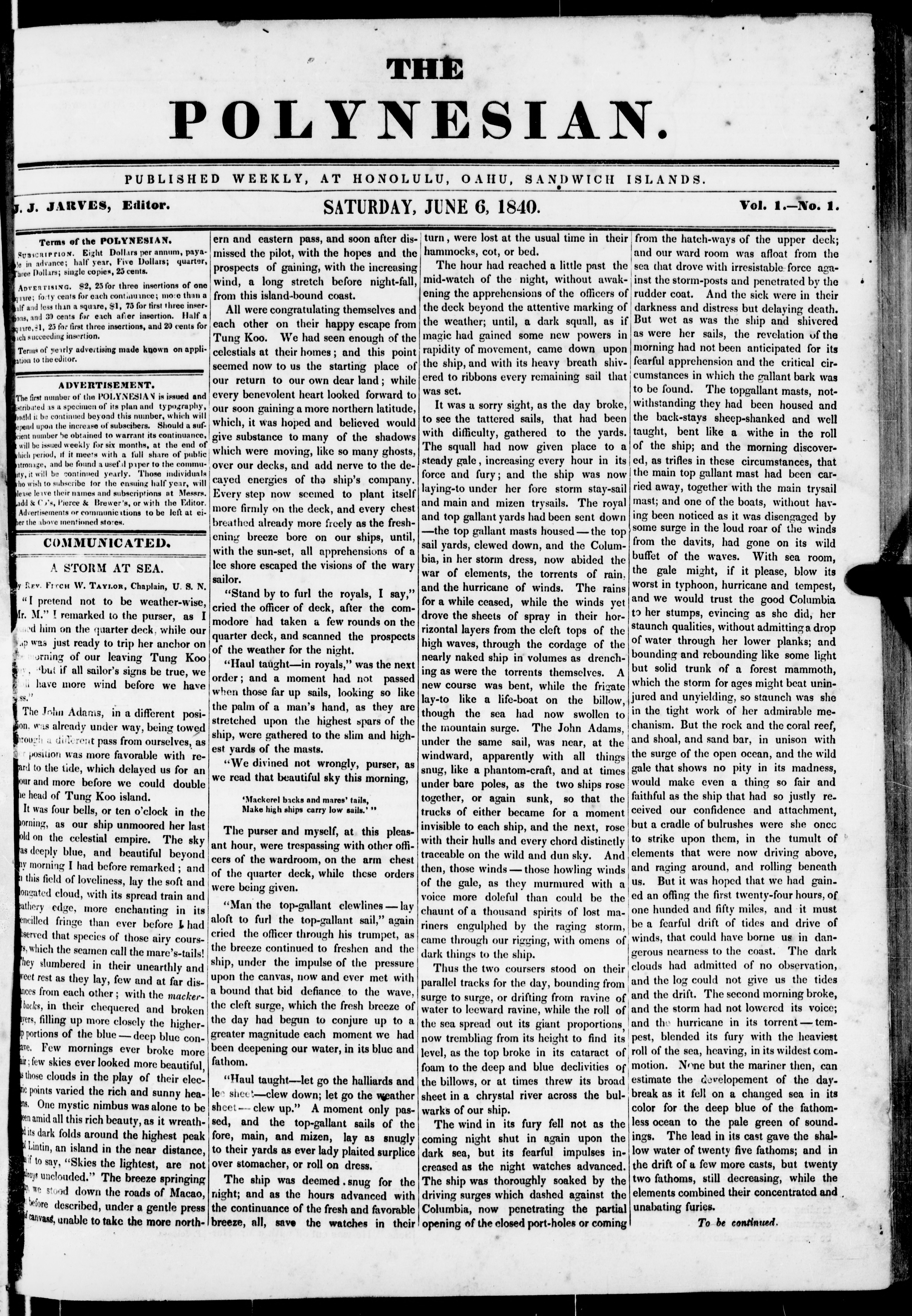
- Front page of the first issue on June 6, 1840
- Type: Weekly newspaper
- Owner(s): James Jackson Jarves (1840-1841, 1844) Hawaiian Kingdom (1845-1861) Abraham Fornander (1861-1864)
- Editor-in-chief: James Jackson Jarves (1840-1841, 1844-184?) Edwin Oscar Hall (?-?); Charles Gordon Hopkins (1848-1849, 1855-1860) Abraham Fornander (1850-1855)
- Founded: June 6, 1840
- Ceased publication: December 11, 1841
- Relaunched: May 18, 1844―February 6, 1864
- Language: English, some Hawaiian
- City: Honolulu
- Country: Hawaiian Kingdom

The Polynesian was a 4-8 page weekly newspaper published in Honolulu, that had two periods of publication: from June 6, 1840, to December 11, 1841, and then from May 18, 1844, to February 6, 1864. From 1845 to 1861, it was the official publication of the government of the Hawaiian Kingdom. The Polynesian was the leading newspaper in Oahu in the mid-1800s.

== History ==
James Jackson Jarves founded the newspaper in June 1840, running it with funds from the American Board of Commissioners for Foreign Missions, advertisements, and subscriptions. However, it was not profitable, and was closed after two and half years of publication. Written for Honolulu's foreign residents, it was among the first Hawaiian newspapers to feature puff pieces that were barely disguised advertising.

Jarves restarted The Polynesian in May 1844, positioning it as impartial. However, in 1845, the Hawaiian Government bought a printing press and The Polynesian. King Kamehameha III commissioned the paper as the "Official Journal of the Hawaiian Government." As such, it published copies of enacted legislation, as well as policies of Kamehameha III and his successor, Kamehameha IV. Meanwhile, it continued to feature "local and international news, business and shipping news, police reports, editorials, and fiction," with its length depending on how much news there was to print that week. Despite being the mouthpiece of the Hawaiian government, Jarves had a pro-American editorial bias, promoting Christianity and Western culture as superior, advocating for the Great Māhele, and endorsing English language for instruction in schools.

In 1848, Jarves left Hawaii, and his printer Charles Gordon Hopkins became editor. Abraham Fornander, who edited several other Honolulu newspapers through 1853 then served as editor of The Polynesian, buying it in 1861. It proved not to be profitable, publishing its last edition on February 6, 1864.
