= Charles Gordon Hopkins =

Politician in the Hawaiian Kingdom

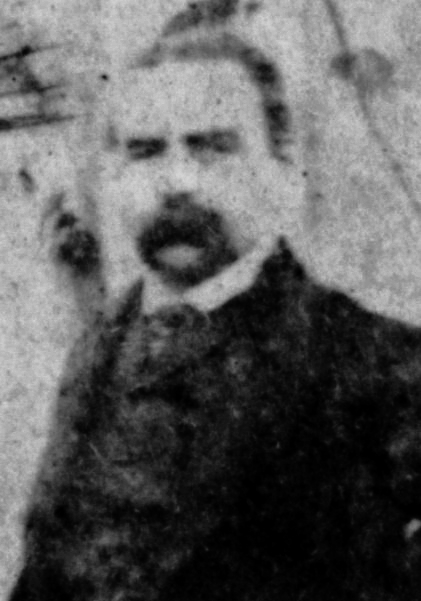
- Charles Gordon Hopkins, 1866

Hawaiian Kingdom Minister of Finance
- In office November 5, 1863 – December 24, 1863
- Preceded by: Robert Crichton Wyllie
- Succeeded by: Charles de Varigny

Hawaiian Kingdom Minister of the Interior
- In office February 18, 1864 – April 26, 1865
- Preceded by: George Morison Robertson
- Succeeded by: Ferdinand William Hutchison

Personal details
- Born: 1822 United Kingdom
- Died: 1886 (aged 63–64) Toulon, France
- Relations: Gerard Manley Hopkins (nephew)
- Children: Charles Louis Kamohoalii Hopkins

Charles Gordon Hopkins (1822–1886) was a British-born politician and newspaper editor of the Hawaiian Kingdom. He served several posts in the Hawaiian government including Minister of Finance and Minister of the Interior. He became an intimate friend and advisor to three successive Hawaiian monarchs. From 1865 to 1866, he accompanied Queen Dowager Emma (widow of Kamehameha IV) on her trip to Europe and the United States.

== Early life ==
He was born in 1822 as the fourth of five children of Edward Martin Hopkins, a London broker, and Ann Manley Hopkins, from an old Devonshire family. His siblings were Ann Eleanor, Manley, Edward Martin and Thomas Marsland Hopkins. His eldest brother Manley supported the family after their father's early death in 1836 while his second older brother Edward Martin Hopkins, worked as a Hudson's Bay Company official and traveled as a private secretary with Governor George Simpson around the world in 1841–42. Hopkins was enticed by the tales of Edward's travels and encouraged to go to Hawaii. In December 1843, Simpson wrote to William Richards, an American advisor and envoy of King Kamehameha III, recommending Charles Hopkins as an official in the Hawaiian monarchy which had recently adopted a Western style constitution and government and was in need of foreign councillors.

== Career in Hawaii ==
Hopkins arrived in Honolulu in February 1845 on the Hudson's Bay Company packet ship Nepaul. He initially served minor posts as a government clerk and a police magistrate while he learned the Hawaiian language. He soon became a naturalized subject of the Hawaiian Kingdom.

He briefly served as editor pro tempore of The Polynesian, the official newspaper of the government, from December 23, 1848, to May 12, 1849. He later resumed as editor of the Polynesian and director of the government press from July 7, 1855, to October 6, 1860. An advocate of the Native Hawaiian people, he wrote an editorial in 1849 promoting the idea of building a free public hospital for the Hawaiians. This idea may have later influenced the foundation of The Queen's Hospital in 1859.

In 1851, Hopkins became a land agent and private secretary to Kamehameha III, who called him "Hopekini", a Hawaiian variant of his surname. During this period, he lived as a member of the royal household on the grounds of one of the royal residences near the Palace, and developed friendships with the king's nephews Alexander Liholiho (Kamehameha IV) and Lot Kapuāiwa (Kamehameha V). He was especially close to the future Kamehameha IV and explored Mauna Kea together with him on a vacation in the summer of 1849. They continued their friendship into his reign and Kamehameha IV's marriage to Emma Rooke. The king took counsel with Hopkins in 1859 when he shot and killed his secretary Henry A. Neilson over a rumour that Neilson was having an affair with Queen Emma.

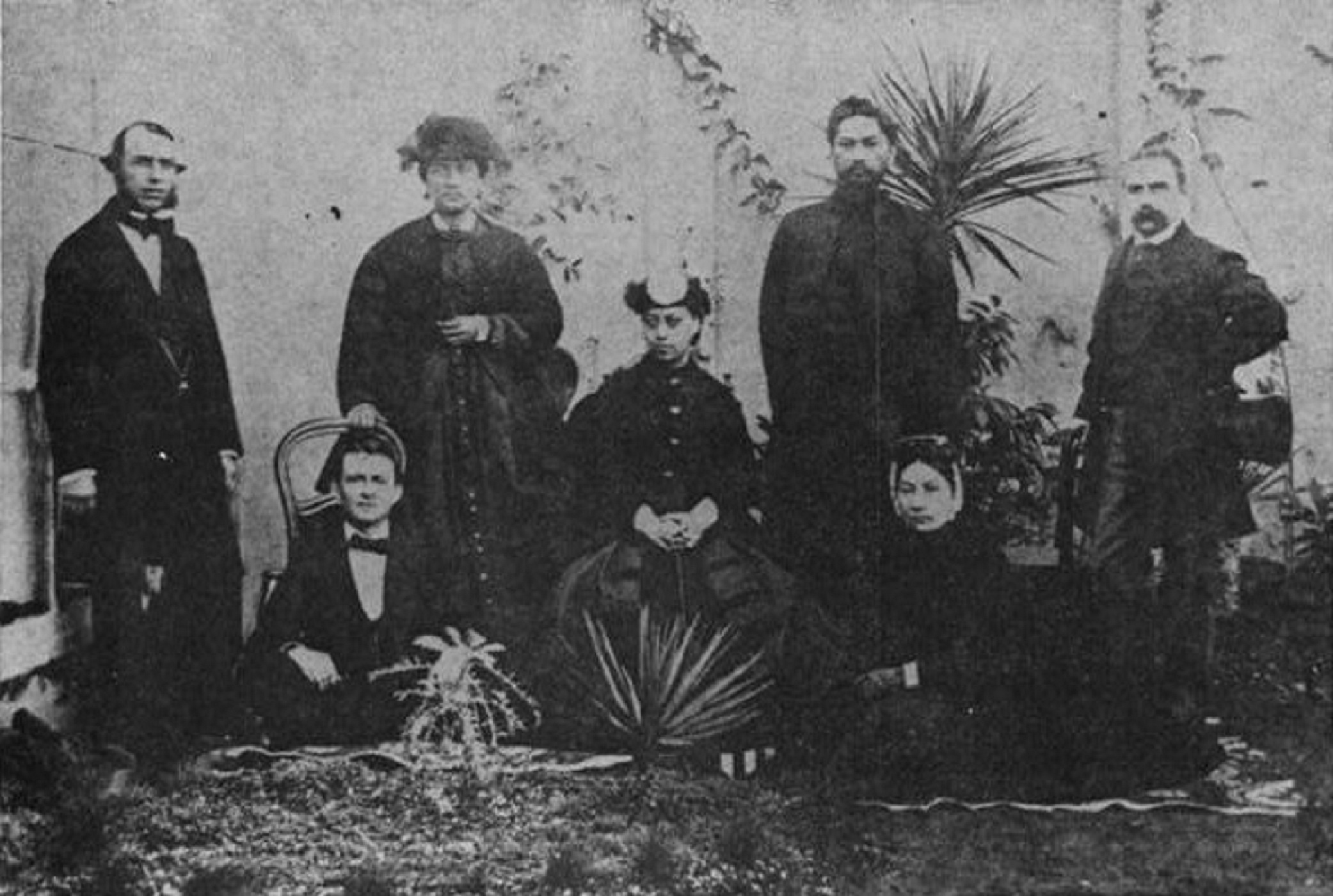
Queen Emma (center), Hopkins (far right) and travel party in France, 1866

Queen Emma's travel to Europe and the United States (1865–1866)

From 1865 to 1866, Hopkins traveled with Queen Dowager Emma (widow of Kamehameha IV who died in 1863) on her trip to Europe and the United States to fundraise for the Anglican mission in Hawaii. He served officially as her aide-de-camp and private secretary and was often referred to as Major Hopkins during their travels. In England, Queen Emma met with Queen Victoria at Windsor Castle. The group also traveled through France and Italy and in Paris, Queen Emma had a private audience with French Emperor Napoleon III at Tuileries Palace. On their return to Hawaii, they visited the United States and was honored by an official reception by President Andrew Johnson at the White House.

During his two decades in Hawaii, Hopkins served in a number of important government posts including member of the Privy Council of State (1845–1864), member of the House of Nobles, the upper house of the legislature of the kingdom (1859–1867) and member of the bureau of public instruction in 1865. He was appointed a colonel in King Kamehameha V's staff on May 6, 1865. Prior to the death of Kamehameha IV, he was briefly appointed Minister of Finance and served from November 5, 1863, to December 24, 1863, until he was replaced by Charles de Varigny by Kamehameha V and instead appointed the king's chamberlain and secretary. He later served a short term as Minister of the Interior from February 18, 1864, to April 26, 1865, until he was succeeded by Ferdinand William Hutchison.

== Personal life ==
In 1856, Hopkins helped his eldest brother Manley Hopkins acquire an appointment by Kamehameha IV as the Hawaiian Consul-General in London, a post he held until his death in 1897. One of Manley's sons was the poet Gerard Manley Hopkins.

In his capacity as a royal favorite and agent of the king, Hopkins acquired lands for ranching at Kahuku on the windward side of the island of Oahu from the royal crown lands. The Euro-American community, especially the American Protestant missionaries, disapproved of Hopkins close association with the Hawaiians and his private life. Hopkins had a son Charles Louis Kamohoalii Hopkins (1853–1918) out of wedlock with a Hawaiian woman. The woman and her husband were working as servants and living with Hopkins at the time.

== Later life and death ==
On November 17, 1867, Hopkins left Hawaii on a steamer for New York. He returned to England by 1868 and spent his latter life in Toulon, in southern France where he died in 1886. All of his private correspondence with his family was lost or destroyed.

His son would serve as deputy-marshal and later marshal of the Hawaiian Kingdom during the reign of King Kalākaua, and in his capacity as marshal, proclaimed the accession of Queen Liliuokalani in 1891. He was elected as a member of the House of Nobles in 1892–93 succeeding Edward C. MacFarlane. He served one terms as police justice of Oahu and was later Hawaiian interpreter for the legislature and circuit courts of the Territory of Hawaii.

== Bibliography ==
- Cracroft, Sophia; Franklin, Jane; Queen Emma (1958). Korn, Alfons L. (ed.). The Victorian Visitors: An Account of the Hawaiian Kingdom, 1861–1866, Including the Journal Letters of Sophia Cracroft: Extracts from the Journals of Lady Franklin, and Diaries and Letters of Queen Emma of Hawaii (PDF). Honolulu: University of Hawaii Press. hdl:10125/39981. ISBN 978-0-87022-421-8. OCLC 8989368.
- Hopkins, Gerard Manley (2015). Gerard Manley Hopkins: Diaries, Journals, and Notebooks. Oxford: Oxford University Press. ISBN 978-0-19-953400-5. OCLC 1014792241.
- Kanahele, George S. (1999). Emma: Hawaii's Remarkable Queen. Honolulu: University of Hawaii Press. ISBN 978-0-8248-2240-8. OCLC 40890919.
- Kuykendall, Ralph Simpson (1953). The Hawaiian Kingdom, 1854–1874, Twenty Critical Years. Vol. 2. Honolulu: University of Hawaii Press. ISBN 978-0-87022-432-4.
- Kuykendall, Ralph Simpson (1967). The Hawaiian Kingdom 1874–1893, The Kalakaua Dynasty. Vol. 3. Honolulu: University of Hawaii Press. ISBN 978-0-87022-433-1. OCLC 500374815. Archived from the original on January 20, 2015.
- Korn, Alfons L. (1957). "Queen Emma in France, 1865–1866" (PDF). Sixty-Fifth Annual Report of the Hawaiian Historical Society for the Year 1956. 61. Honolulu: Hawaiian Historical Society: 7–24. hdl:10524/62. OCLC 722778378.
- Mariani, Paul L. (2008). Gerard Manley Hopkins: A Life. New York: Viking. ISBN 978-0-670-02031-7. OCLC 213308771.
