= Abraham Fornander =

American journalist, judge, ethnologist (1812–1887)

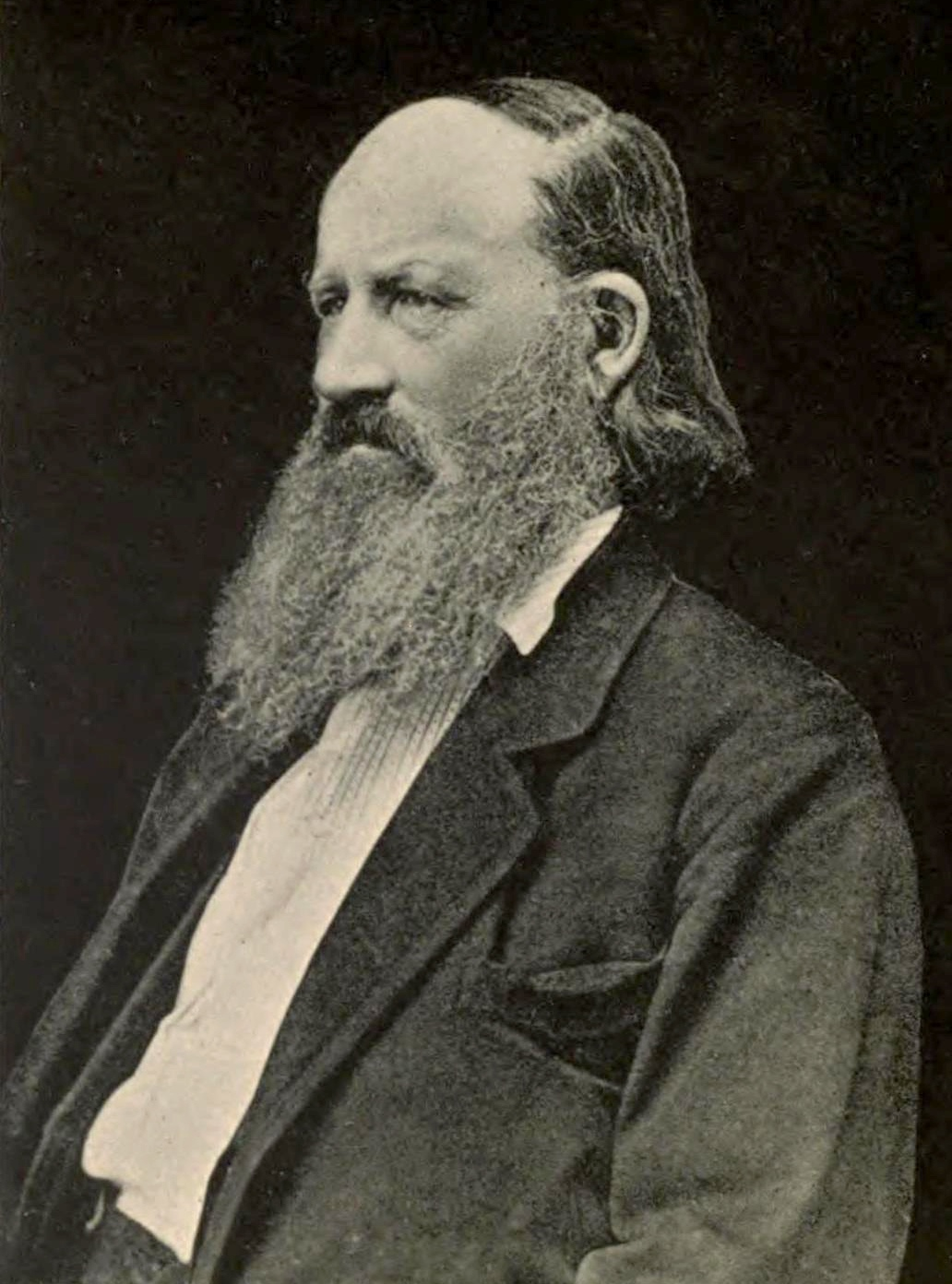
Abraham Fornander, about 1878

Abraham Fornander (November 4, 1812 – November 1, 1887) was a Swedish-born emigrant who became an important journalist, judge, and ethnologist in Hawaii.

== Early life and education ==
Fornander was born in Öland, Sweden on November 4, 1812, to Anders (1778–1828) and Karin Fornander (1788–1872). His education was under his father, a local clergyman, except for the years 1822–1823 when he studied Latin, Greek, and Hebrew at gymnasium in Kalmar. His mother's surname was spelled Foenander, so his surname is sometimes spelled that way.

In 1828, he began studying theology at the University of Uppsala, transferring in 1830 to the University of Lund. In 1831, he left university to attend to his family, which had fallen under hard times. While providing for his family, he fell in love with his mother's youngest sister, who was four years his senior. After a short affair, Fornander left Öland, traveling to Malmö and then Copenhagen, from where he traveled to America.

== Hawaii ==
=== Move to Hawaii ===
The next years are poorly documented, but Fornander wrote that circumstances in America forced him to go to sea and become a whaler. After first arriving at the Hawaiian islands in 1838, he joined a whaling cruise which returned in 1842. Following his stint at sea, English physician Thomas Charles Byde Rooke hired Fornander as a coffee planter in Nuʻuanu Pali, Oahu. In 1847, Rooke hired Fornander as his land surveyor.

On January 19, 1847, Fornander became a citizen of the Kingdom of Hawaii after taking an oath of allegiance to Kamehameha III. In the same year, he married Pinao Alanakapu, a Hawaiian chiefess of Molokai, in Honolulu. Per his obituary, the couple had three daughters and one son, of whom only Mrs. J. H. Brown (Catherine) survived to adulthood (b. 1849, d. 1905). His wife died on 20 January 1857 of puerperal fever, four days after giving birth to their son Charles.

=== Journalism ===
Beginning in 1849, as Hawaii began to consider further constitutional change, Fornander began writing for an upstart paper, the Argus, which he eventually took over. He used his paper to advocate responsible government, improvements to public education, and reform. When the paper failed in 1855, Fornander began a new venture called the Sandwich Islands Monthly, which was to cover both items of local interest and discussion of the great scientific, literary, and theological questions of the day. Although the magazine survived less than a year, a recurring theme in Fornander's writing was a concern for the status and condition of native Hawaiians. Fornander then went to work for The Polynesian, a rival publication that he now edited until its demise in 1864.

=== Life as a public official ===
In late 1863, the new Hawaiian king Kamehameha V recognized Fornander's talents and appointed him to the nation's privy council, which were thirty of the most distinguished men in the islands. In May 1864, the King made Fornander a judge, a position that he held for less than a year before he was made superintendent of the Honolulu school district, and then in March 1865, Inspector General of Schools for the entire kingdom.

Fornander had long been an advocate of public education, and his administration had three main goals: to put the system on a non-sectarian basis, improve opportunities for girls, and improve the teaching of English. The first of these goals won him the increasing animosity of American Protestant missionaries, who saw his attempt at even-handedness as disguised prejudice. By July 1870, their opposition had become great enough to replace Fornander as Inspector General.

The king, however, re-appointed him in May 1871 to the circuit court, a position that he would hold for the next twelve years together with a variety of other governmental boards and commissions. These positions required Fornander to travel a good deal, which allowed him to learn more about Hawaiian mythology and the Hawaiian language.

=== Account of the Polynesian Race ===
While undertaking these duties, Fornander had long been developing theories of Hawaiian origins and collecting material for a work setting out his thoughts. In 1877, he finished the first volume of his monumental An Account of the Polynesian Race, its Origin and Migrations, and the Ancient History of the Hawaiian People to the Times of Kamehameha I, which was published in London in the following year. This volume dealt with the now-discredited hypothesis that the Polynesians were Aryans, both racially and linguistically, who had over the ages migrated through India and the Malay Archipelago into the Pacific islands.

Basing his theory on the comparison of Polynesian languages, genealogies, and mythology, Fornander estimated that the Polynesians first entered the Pacific in Fiji in the 1st or 2nd centuries AD. When expelled by Melanesians, the inhabitants made their way to Samoa and Tonga, and by AD 400 or 500, to Hawaii, where they lived in isolation until the 11th century, when new groups began to arrive.

Fornander paid special attention to legends and genealogies that he thought preserved the history of the Hawaiian islands after their settlement—their external and internal wars, dynastic quarrels, and eventually their contact by Captain James Cook and George Vancouver. He later published more volumes in the series, ending with the final victory of Kamehameha I and the consolidation of his rule over all the islands.

The work brought Fornander attention from abroad. He was invited to become a corresponding member of the California Academy of Sciences in 1878, and in the following year the Hawaiian King made him a Knight Companion of the Royal Order of Kalākaua. In 1880, he was invited to become a correspondent of the Swedish Society for Anthropology and Geography (Svenska sällskapet för antropologi och geografi).

=== Later life ===
Fornander thrived on the international praise that his work had won him, but continued in his various official duties, including serving as acting governor of Maui. In 1886, he began to complain of pain in his mouth, and it soon became clear that he had a malignancy. Although he continued to travel as a circuit judge, the Hawaiian assembly voted him a pension of $1200 per month once he ceased to draw a government salary, together with a $2500 one-time grant to cover expenses incurred in the publication of his research which was described as "the most learned work ever written here [and] a credit to the author, to his adopted country, and to the Hawaiian people".

In November 1886, Fornander was made a Knight Commander of the Royal Order of Kamehameha I, the last man ever awarded that honour, and in December, he was made a Knight of the North Star (Nordstjärneorden) by Oscar II of Sweden, King of Sweden and Norway.

On December 27, 1886, Fornander was appointed an associate justice of the supreme court and he was installed in the position early in the new year. His illness now was too far advanced for him to actually serve. His final months were spent in the home of his only daughter. He died November 1, 1887, from a prolonged battle with cancer.

== Impact and influence ==
The obituaries marking Fornander's death praised his contribution to Hawaii as both a jurist and a scholar. The Hawaiian royal family participated in his funeral, and a memorial in his honour was erected in Honolulu, where it still stands today (near Pensacola Street).

His estate left his papers and library to his daughter, who sold them to Charles Reed Bishop. This included over 300 books, in addition to scores of journals, bulletins, and scientific yearbooks. In time the collection passed into the control of the Hawaiian Historical Society, where they still reside.

Bishop had also acquired Fornander's own papers and voluminous notes, which he gave to the Bernice P. Bishop Museum, founded in memory of his wife. These papers, recording many chants, folktales, myths, and genealogies, were finally published as the Fornander Collection. These have Fornander's transcriptions in Hawaiian, together with a later English translation edited by Thomas George Thrum on facing pages, and were published from the years 1916 to 1920.
