= James Jackson Jarves =

American journalist and art critic

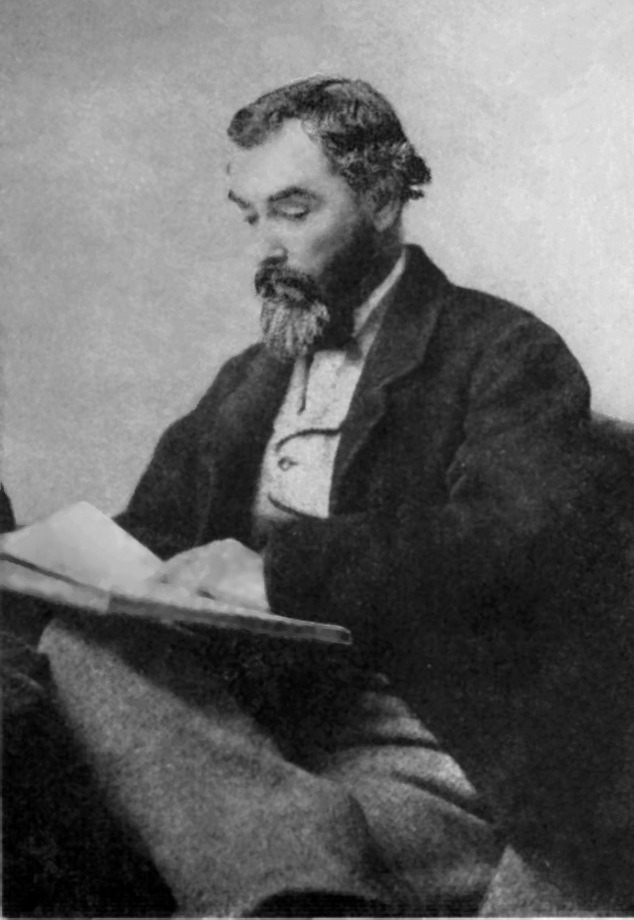
James Jackson Jarves reading

James Jackson Jarves (1818–1888) was an American newspaper editor and art critic who is remembered above all as the first American art collector to buy Italian primitives and Old Masters.

== Life and career ==
Jarves was the editor of an early weekly newspaper in the Hawaiian Islands, The Polynesian (1840–48). During the 1850s, Jarves relocated to Florence, Italy where he served as the U.S. vice-consul and collected art. After other American museums refused to buy Jarves' collection, Yale University granted him a loan with the collection as collateral. When Jarves defaulted in 1871, the Yale University Art Gallery purchased 119 Italian paintings, spanning the centuries from the tenth to the seventeenth, for a price of $22,000 or $30,000. The "Master of the Jarves Cassone", later discovered to be Apollonio di Giovanni di Tomaso, was named after him.

An honorary Hawaiian citizen, Jarves was awarded the order of Kamehameha I for his diplomatic services to Hawaii while empires fought to control it. The king of Italy appointed him Cavaliere della Corona d'Italia for his contribution to Italian art.'

Jarves married Elizabeth Russell Swain in 1838. One year after his first wife's death, Jarves in 1862 married Isabella Kast Heyden who died in 1887. In 1888 Jarves died of jaundice; he is buried on the English Cemetery in Rome.

Jarves and his second wife are, through their daughter Annabel, the great-great grandparents of Lady Elizabeth Marian Frances Kerr. Lady Elizabeth is the wife of Richard Scott, 10th Duke of Buccleuch and mother of the ducal heir. They are also the great-great-great grandparents of Henry Oliver Charles FitzRoy, 12th Duke of Grafton, whose mother is Lady Clare Amabel Margaret Kerr, widow of James FitzRoy, Earl of Euston and the sister of Lady Elizabeth Marian Frances Kerr.

Edith Wharton drew upon Jarves' well-known misfortunes in her novella False Dawn (The Forties).

== Books ==
Some of his works:

- History of the Hawaiian or Sandwich Islands: Embracing Their Antiquities, Mythology, Legends, Discovery by Europeans in the Sixteenth Century, Re-Discovery by Cook, with Their Civil, Religious and Political History, from the Earliest Traditionary Period to the Present Time (1843)
- Scenes and Scenery in the Sandwich Islands, and a trip through Central America: being observations from my notebooks during the years 1837-1842 (1843)
- Parisian Sights and French Principles, Seen Through American Spectacles (1852)
- Parisian Sights and French Principles, Seen Through American Spectacles, Second Series (1855)
- Art-Hints, Architecture, Sculpture and Painting (1855)
- Italian Sights and Papal Principles, Seen Through American Spectacles (1856)
- Kiana: A Tradition of Hawaii (1857)
- Why and What Am I? The Confessions of an Inquirer, In Three Parts. Part I. Heart-Experience; or, The Education of the Emotions (1857)
- Art Studies: The "Old Masters" of Italy; Painting (1861)
- The Art-Idea: Part Second of Confessions of an Inquirer (1864)
- Art Thoughts, The Experiences and Observations of an American Amateur in Europe (1870)
- A Glimpse at the Art of Japan (1876)
- Italian Rambles, Studies of Life and Manners in New and Old Italy (1883)
- Pepero, the Boy-Artist. A Brief Memoir of James Jackson Jarves, Jr. (1891)

== Articles ==
This list is incomplete.

- Jarves, J. Jackson, Genius of Doré. The Atlantic Monthly, vol. 24, issue 143 (September 1869).
- Jarves, J. Jackson, Asceticism, or the Sanctuary of St. Francis. The Galaxy, vol. 8, issue 4 (Oct 1869).
- Jarves, J. Jackson, [The Believer and the Unbeliever in English Art] "The Art Journal", 1 August 1869.
- Jarves, J. Jackson, Museums of Art. The Galaxy, vol. 10, issue 1 (July 1870).
- Jarves, J. Jackson, A new Phase of Druidism. The Galaxy, vol. 10, issue 6 (December 1870).
- Jarves, James Jackson, Pescaglia, the Home of a Mad Artist. The Atlantic Monthly, vol. 34, issue 203 (September 1874).
- Jarves, J. Jackson, Ethics of Taste. The Duty of Being Beautiful "The Art Journal", New Series Vol. 1 (1875)
- Jarves, James Jackson, American Museums of Art. Scribner's Monthly, vol. 18, issue 3 (July 1879).
- Jarves, James Jackson, The New School of Italian Painting and Sculpture. Harper's New Monthly Magazine, vol. 60, issue 358 (March 1880).
- Jarves, James Jackson, Ancient and Modern Venetian Glass of Murano. Harper's New Monthly Magazine, vol. 64, issue 380 (January 1882).
- Jarves, James Jackson, The Gates of Paradise. Harper's New Monthly Magazine, vol. 65, issue 385 (June 1882).

== See also ==
- Coins of Hawaii
- Deming Jarves, his father
