= Hawaiian dollar =

Currency of Hawaii from 1847 to 1898

Dala (Hawaiian)
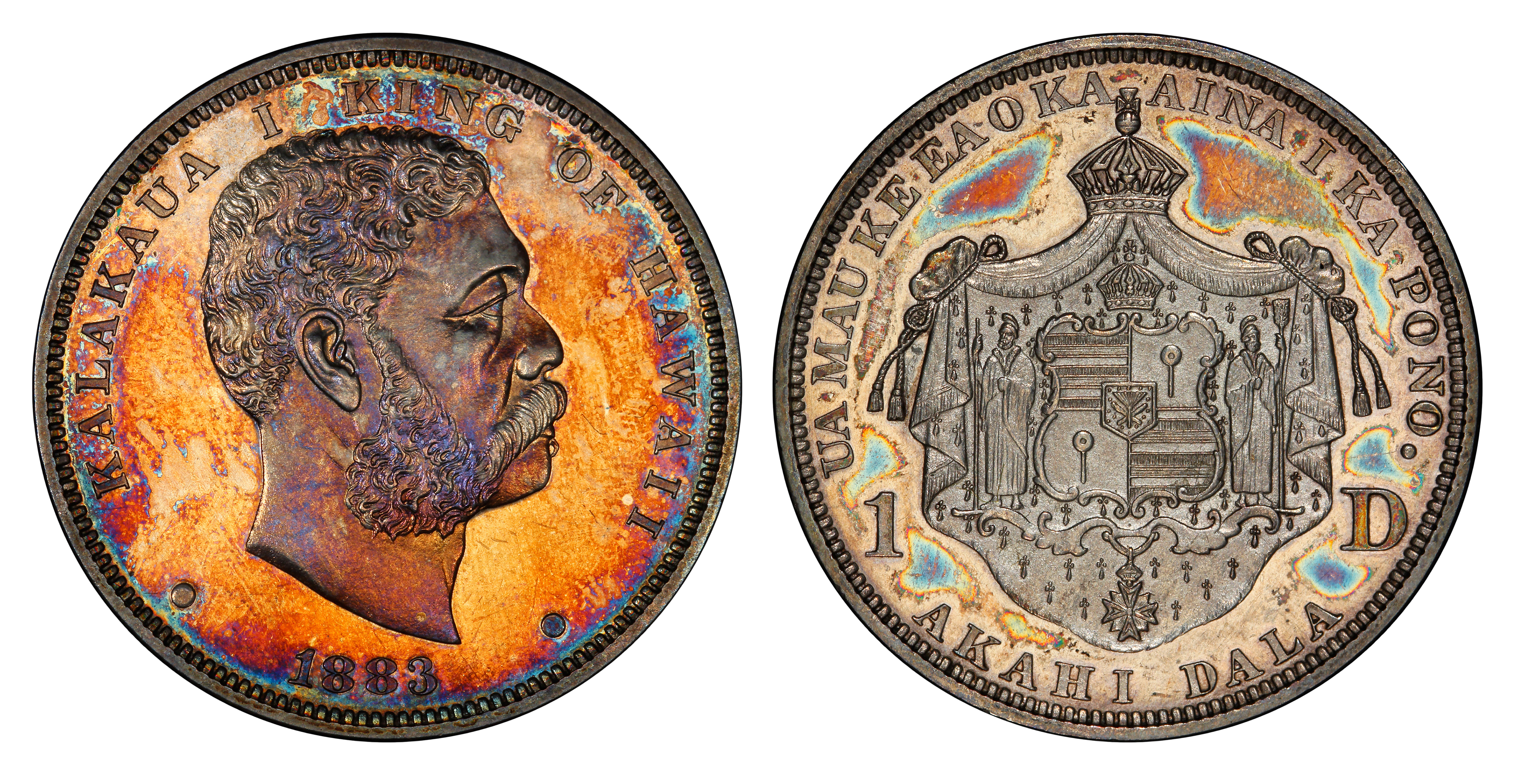
- Kingdom of Hawaii 1883 dollar

Units of account
- Plural: dollars (dalas)
- Symbol: $
- Subunit
- 1/100: cent (keneta)
- Plural
- cent (keneta): cents (keneta)

Denominations
- Banknotes: $10, $20, $50 and $100 (silver coin deposit certificates)
- Coins: one dime (umi keneta), quarter dollar (hapaha), half dollar (hapalua) and one dollar (akahi dala)

Demographics
- User(s): Hawaiian Kingdom

Issuance
- Monetary authority: Department of Finance
- Mint: San Francisco Mint (struck coins for circulation) and Philadelphia Mint (struck presentation proofs)

Valuation
- Pegged with: United States dollar at par
- This infobox shows the latest status before this currency was rendered obsolete.

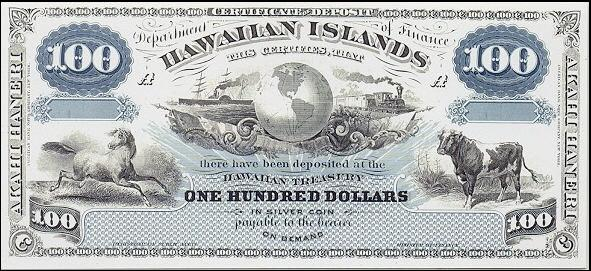
One Hundred Hawaiian Dollars

The dollar or dala (Note: Dala was the spelling used at the time, though during the preparations for minting Edward Preston asked Claus Spreckels whether to spell it dala or kala. The modern spelling would be kālā.) was the currency of Hawaii between 1847 and 1898. It was equal to the United States dollar and was also divided into 100 cents or keneta. Only sporadic issues were ever minted and printed, which circulated alongside United States dollar.

== Coins ==
The first official coinage issued by the Kingdom of Hawai'i was in 1847. This coin was a copper cent bearing the portrait of King Kamehameha III on its obverse. The King Kamehameha III copper cent proved to be unpopular due to the King's portrait being of poor quality. Although it is claimed the denomination was misspelled (hapa haneri instead of hapa haneli), the spelling "Hapa Haneri" was correct until the end the 19th century. The spelling "Haneri" (Hawaiian for "Hundred") appears on all $100 and $500 Hawaiian bank notes in circulation between 1879 and 1900.

In 1883, Kingdom of Hawai'i official silver coinage were issued in the denominations of one dime (ʻumi keneta (Note: spelt umi sans ʻokina at the time) in Hawaiian), quarter dollar (hapahā) (Note: spelt hapaha sans kahakō at the time), half dollar (hapalua) and one dollar (ʻakahi dala) (Note: spelt akahi sans ʻokina). 26 proof sets were struck by the Philadelphia Mint and contained the umi keneta, hapaha, hapalua, and akahi dala. 20 proof specimens in the denomination of an eighth dollar (hapawalu) were also struck. The Kingdom of Hawai'i desired to conform to the United States silver coinage denominations and selected the umi keneta over the hapawalu. The silver coins issued for circulation in the Kingdom was struck by the San Francisco Mint.

Hawaiian coins continued to circulate for several years after the 1898 annexation to the United States. In 1903, an act of Congress demonetized Hawaiian coins effective January 1, 1904, and most were withdrawn and melted, with a sizable percentage of surviving examples made into jewelry. Following melting, the maximum number of each circulating coin that could possibly exist is as follows:

- Umi Keneta - 1 Dime (10 cents): 249,921
- Hapaha - 1/4 Dollar (25 cent): 242,600
- Hapalua - 1/2 Dollar (50 cents): 87,700
- Akahi Dala - 1 Dollar: 46,300

== Banknotes ==
In 1879, the Department of Finance issued Hawaiʻi's first paper money, silver coin deposit certificates for $10, $20, $50 and $100. However, these notes were issued only in small numbers and US notes made up the bulk of circulating paper money. From 1884, only US gold coins were legal tender for amounts over $10.

In 1897, the Republic of Hawaii issued silver coin deposit certificates for $5, $10, $20, $50 and $100. In 1899, banknotes backed by gold deposits were issued in the same denominations. All Hawaiian notes, especially the gold certificates, are extremely rare today.

== See also ==
- Coins of the Hawaiian dollar
- Hawaii overprint note
