= Leprosy in India =

Leprosy currently affects approximately a quarter of a million people throughout the world, with the majority of these cases being reported from India.

India is a signatory of the United Nations Convention on the Rights of Persons with Disabilities (UNCRPD). India is currently running one of the largest leprosy eradication program in the world, the National Leprosy Eradication Program (NLEP). Despite this, 120,000 to 130,000 new cases of leprosy are reported every year in India. This is 58.8% of the global total of new cases.

== Transmission, treatment and disability ==
Leprosy is one of the least infectious diseases as nearly everyone has some measure of natural resistance against it. Nevertheless, it continues to spread, partially due to its extremely long incubation period, which may last as long as 30 years, as well as widespread ignorance and misinformation about the symptoms and effects of the disease. Stigma against the disease due to its disfigurement causes its victims to be isolated and shunned. They may also isolate themselves out of fear of discrimination. Patients may be impacted in every area of their life, including interpersonal relationships, economic security, and mental health and wellbeing. Leprosy is also the leading cause of permanent disability in the world and is primarily a disease of the poor.

The disease is now readily treatable with multi-drug therapy, which combines three drugs to kill the pathogen and cure the victim. Disability and disfigurement can be avoided if the disease is treated early, while conversely delay in treatment is linked to greater disability. Unfortunately, individuals with leprosy are still shunned, isolated, and stigmatised, leading to the fear of leprosy being worse than the disease itself. Additionally, the initial symptoms are not obvious and may easily be mistaken for other conditions, such as insect bites or allergic reactions. Patients may consider the disease too minor to warrant a visit to a doctor and fear losing their wages.

People suffering from severe leprosy-related disabilities face extensive discrimination. Often, the only way they can make money is by begging. Under these conditions, they may mutilate themselves to garner more sympathy and therefore more money. Sufferers may also hide their symptoms or diagnosis from their family or colleagues, have difficulty maintaining a job, or avoid physical contact with their family.

Leprosy colonies exist throughout India. These are typically made up of patients that have moved to the colony from a significant distance away, and their children and grandchildren. These colonies have a very strong community bond, formed in reaction to outside discrimination and stigma.

== History ==
India is considered the point of origin of leprosy with skeletal evidence of the disease dating to 2000 B.C. The disease is thought to have spread through trade and war to other parts of Asia, the Middle East, North Africa, and later Europe and the Americas. In ancient Indian society, individuals suffering from leprosy were alienated because the disease was chronic, contagious, resulted in disfigurement, had no cure at the time, and was associated with sin. In colonial India, the government enacted the Lepers Act, 1898, which institutionalised leprosy victims and separated them based on gender to prevent reproduction. These laws mainly affected the poor because those who were self-sufficient were not obligated to be isolated or seek medical treatment.

In 1991, India contained 75% of the world's leprosy cases. In Mumbai, the only dedicated centre for leprosy has been the Acworth Leprosy Hospital which opened in 1980. Leprosy treatment was handled by the National Leprosy Elimination Programme, which was completely separated from other healthcare services. In 2005, this was incorporated into the broader healthcare system, and shortly afterwards, India announced that it had eliminated leprosy as a public health problem. However, this only means that there is less than 1 person in 10,000 infected with the disease. There is a lower percentage of affected individuals, but this number is still enormous in absolute terms, and India still makes up 58.8% of the world's leprosy cases. Since this announcement, funding for leprosy prevention and education programs has been drastically reduced. The prevalence and rate of infection have remained steady from 2005 to 2015, and there are still significant delays in treatment, both from the patients and the healthcare system itself, due to a lack of knowledge about the disease. Current programs include house-to-house examinations designed to identify hidden cases of leprosy.

== Legal discrimination ==
The historical legacy and societal stigma toward leprosy are evidenced by various laws containing discriminatory clauses against leprosy victims. Laws in the states of Chhattisgarh, Rajasthan, Madhya Pradesh, Andhra Pradesh, and Odisha prohibit leprosy patients from running in local elections. Other laws include the Motor Vehicle Act of 1939, which restricts leprosy patients from obtaining a driving license, and the Indian Rail Act of 1990, which prohibits leprosy patients from travelling by train.

Over 100 discriminatory laws were challenged in a plea by the Vidhi Centre for Legal Policy on December 4, 2017. The Supreme Court recommended the matter to the attention of the government, following up on a previous Law Commission report. The specific laws and regulations named included Section 13 of the Hindu Marriage Act, which permits leprosy as a justification for divorce; Section 70(3)(b) of the Odisha Municipal Corporation Act, which prevents leprosy patients from running for the office of Corporator, and other similar laws. A bill seeking to remove leprosy as a ground for divorce was passed by the Lok Sabha on 7th of Jan 2019.

Many of these laws were written before the development of multi-drug therapy (MDT), a treatment that can make leprosy patients non-contagious and prevent further deterioration, and they have not been updated since. For example, almost all of the marriage and divorce laws of India consider leprosy as grounds for divorce, with the Special Marriage Act of 1954 declaring leprosy "incurable". These laws do not reflect the current understanding of leprosy.

== See also ==
- Baba Amte
- Gerhard Fischer (diplomat)
- Disability in India
