= Whole blood clotting test =

Type of blood test

- Purpose: to check coagulation mechanism in the blood following a snake bite

The whole blood clotting test is a blood test used to check the coagulation mechanism in the blood following a snake bite. If the test is positive after a bite in South East Asia it indicates the snake was a viper rather than an elapid. It can also be used to assess the effectiveness of antivenin therapy.

== Method ==
This test indirectly measures the severity of defibrinogenation in envenomed samples. The test is done by collecting 2 ml of venous blood in a dry and clean glass tube. The clot and stability of the formed clot is checked after 20 minutes.
