= Deming Jarves =

American glass manufacturer

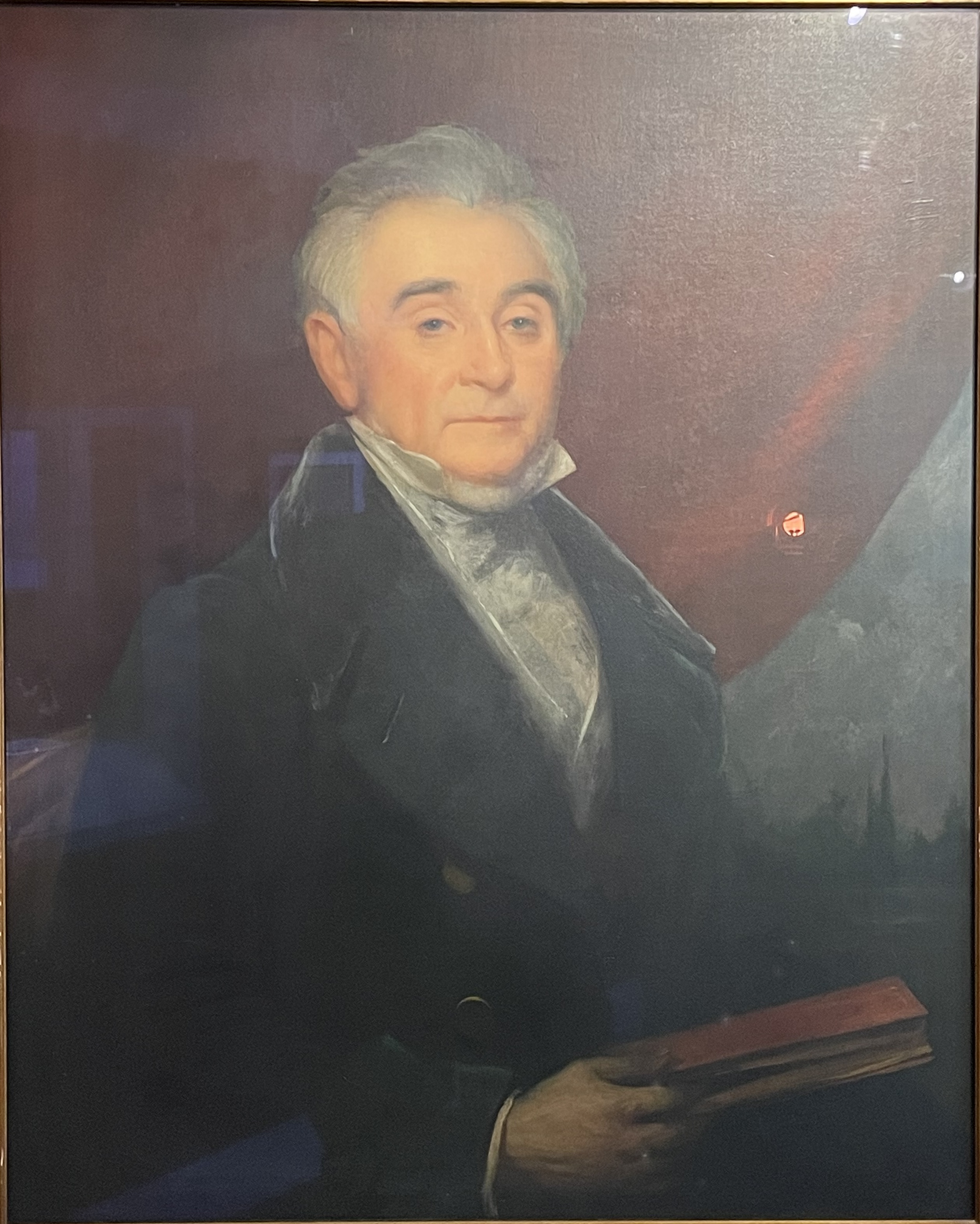
- Born: 21 November 1790
- Died: 15 April 1869 (aged 78)
- Occupation: Glassmaker
- Children: James Jackson Jarves
- Parent(s): John Jarves; Hannah Seabury

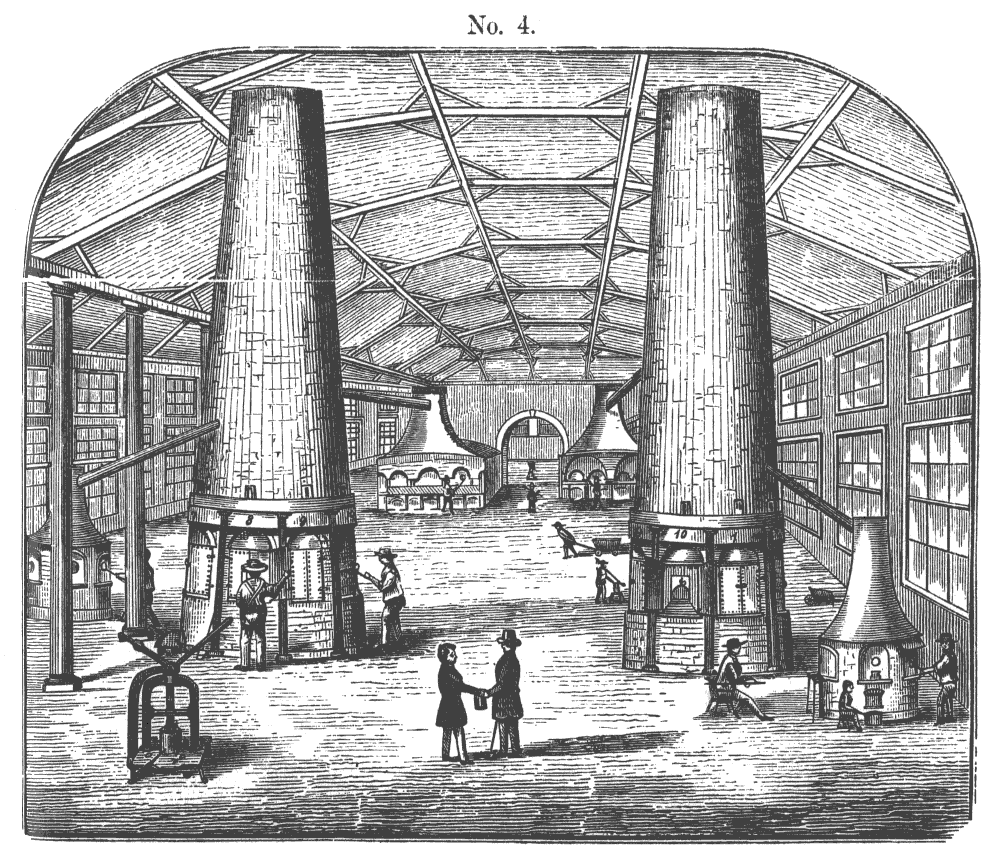
Illustration from Jarves's 1854 publication Reminiscences of Glass-Making

Deming Jarves (21 November 1790 – 15 April 1869) was an American glass manufacturer in Massachusetts. He has been called the "father of the American glass industry".

Jarves was born in 1790 in Boston, Massachusetts to a "prosperous cabinetmaker."

Jarves entered the glass industry in 1809 when he, with a group of investors, gained control of the window glass company Boston Crown Glass. During the War of 1812, American glass manufacturers lost access to high–quality sand and red lead, which was an essential ingredient for high–quality glass. After the war, British manufacturers began dumping low–priced glass in the United States. This caused many American glass manufacturers, including Boston Crown Glass, to go out of business.

Around 1814, he partnered with Joseph B. Henshaw to form the Boston china and glass firm Henshaw and Jarves, which imported crockery from England. The firm ceased operations in 1818.

In 1818, Jarves and a group of investors founded the New England Glass Company, where Jarves researched ways to produce red lead using domestic sources. He worked for the company between 1818 and 1825. He conducted business from offices in Boston, and the company's factory was located in East Cambridge. By 1819 he was producing red lead, which enabled the production of better quality glass.

In 1825, Jarves began what would become the Boston and Sandwich Glass Company the following year with a factory in Sandwich, Massachusetts, specializing in blown glassware, mold-blown glass, and machine-pressed glass. He worked with molds and was an early user of pressed glass machines. The company became famous for its pressed glass. He built what one writer calls "the most important manufacturer of pressed glass in 19th-century America".

Jarves also founded the Mt. Washington Glass Works in South Boston in 1837 under the management of Captain Luther Russell.

He left in 1858 after a dispute with the board of directors and started the rival Cape Cod Glass Works in the same town, with his son John running it. However, when John Jarves died in 1863 at the age of 28, his father halfheartedly took over his duties. The company was not a success, and shareholders recommended it be sold. Jarves did so on 15 April 1869 and died the same day.

Jarves smuggled glassmaking talent from Europe to Boston, and kept a book of various glass recipes. This ended the threat of glassmakers leaving with their secret methods and crippling their former employer. He also worked to improve technology such as improving the efficiency of his furnaces that used wood as a fuel source.

His children included John (c. 1835–1863); James (1818–1888), a newspaper editor and art critic; and Deming Jarves.
