= Leper colony stigma =

Social stigma around people with leprosy

There has, historically, been fear around leprosy and people with the disease have suffered stigma, isolation and social exclusion. Expulsion of individuals infected with leprosy to quarantined areas or special institutions has been the general protocol since ancient times and was the recommended course of action by the Leprosy Conference of Berlin 1897. As a result, the exclusion and quarantining of people infected with leprosy became law, hence leper colony were formed. The inhabitants of these colonies had very little legal recourse in preventing their exclusion and, even after they were treated and cured, many had trouble reintegrating into society. Even by the 1960s, when leprosy was highly treatable and curable, it still resulted in repulsion, and the exclusion of sufferers, by the general populace. As leprosy became curable, the focus of study shifted towards investigating the social aspects of the disease. This is relevant as the disease is resurging and demonstrating resistance to previous remedies.

== Hawaii ==
Kalaupapa, a small village on Molokai island, Hawaii was a legally mandated place of banishment for citizens with leprosy. “It became so after 1865, when the Kingdom of Hawaii passed “An Act to Prevent the Spread of Leprosy” and effectively defined people diagnosed with leprosy as criminals. The State of Hawaii did not repeal the law until 1969.” The historian Carolyn Strange argues that the history of this island with its forced segregation, stigma and death contrasted with its present state as a tourist destination and as a sacred place for Christian pilgrimages which makes this island a symbol for human rights struggles and integration. By recognizing the issues and the rights of those who were cast as criminals for simply being ill with an infectious disease and segregated against their will, it can aid present society with the future handling of people with infectious diseases; a main theme when discussing the stigmas attached to leprosy colonies.

== The Philippines ==
In 1904 a leper colony was founded in the Philippines on a remote island called Culion, also known as the Island of Living Dead. Most of these people lived in isolation and engaged in crude agriculture and fishing and most lived in great poverty. As time went on and medical advancements were made towards the curing of leprosy, the island welcomed people with non-leprosy as settlers, many of whom were the relatives and friends of the pre-existing patients. As the disease became less of a threat and cures and treatments became available, the stigma behind the disease began to lessen and the quality of life for those on the island improved. “Biomedical research facilities have been built there which provide no-fee medical consultation, diagnostic and treatment services to patients with leprosy and other skin diseases.” As the fear aspect of the disease lessened the community became more accepting in the Philippines and the same efforts to distort history as in Hawaii are not existent as the Cullion Leper Colony still exists today and helps house and treat the current population with skin disorders.

== China ==
In China, various causes contributed to the long-term existence and spread of leprosy. In the past, people frequently lived in poverty under poor health conditions with overcrowding and poor nutrition. As in other countries with a history of a leprosy endemic, these factors are consistent in China as they are with other nations. Most leprosy colonies were located in isolated places with poor transportation routes and with housing that was on the verge of collapse. The leprosy colonies had a shortage of medical materials and the health of these people was greatly neglected. This was a result of the stigma that those infected received from the general public and holds true to form of other similar colonies throughout the world. Chinese experts now recommend that the small and isolated leprosy colonies should be closed and that newer more modern centres should be established that are more integrated within society. The newly established centres should act as place for reference, training and research on the disease. As in other countries once the disease became treatable much of the stigma was removed from the sufferers of the disease and an effort to increase of the lifespan and end the isolation of these people became a mandate.

== Brazil ==
In Brazil the isolation of people with leprosy was compulsory by law from the years 1920-1962 but in reality operated in this fashion until the 1980s. This, was largely based on the stigmas associated with the disease. Data were collected and were further analyzed, utilizing the Stigma reference. The results indicated that after entry in the institution, these patients got their broken family bonds, the citizens lost their rights, regarding the situation, they took upon a new life, in the new environment. These patients had difficulty receiving proper care due to the nature of their disease during the time periods these colonies operated. “Leprosy, fraught with prejudice and stigma in the early 20s was treated for decades with stringent policies of compulsory isolation of patients in hospitals colonies. Because of prejudice, there was difficulty in hiring staff to maintain these establishments.” The misinformation and the inability to treat the disease was the cause of this stigma towards those infected. “It was found that leprosy causes a great impact on the everyday lives of these people through the stigma and prejudice related to lack of knowledge about the transmission, control and cure of the disease and the ancient history it carries.”

== Leprosy today ==
Leprosy has existed in the world since ancient times and continues to exist in the world today, despite being largely curable and treatable. The stigmas associated with the disease have impacted on those suffering from leprosy in a highly negative way that up until recently was socially accepted. “The influence of the Christian Church was such that the ritualised banning of lepers became incorporated into the treatment of elephantiasis -- against the advice of physicians like Caelius Aurelianus (4th/5th century AD)". Gradually the name lepra (leprosy) replaced elephantiasis, which ensured the stigmatisation of leprosy as an "unclean disease" with divine punishment for previous sins—a tragic misconception which persisted up to modern times. The disease was seen as unclean, highly contagious and left people horrifically scarred from its effects, this allowed for the sufferers to become easily stigmatized against. From researching various leper colonies from around the world the disease has been most prevalent in those who live in poor areas, with poor sanitation and drinking water. The disease also became connected to being poor, which goes hand in hand with the idea that it was a result of being unclean. This stigmatizing of people due to misconceptions of how the disease is transmitted and prejudices against the people who more commonly contract the disease can be seen in other diseases today such as AIDS and SARS with homophobia and racism as stigmas attached to these diseases. In a comparative study between AIDS and leprosy there was determined to still be stigmas attached to each, with AIDS receiving a more constant form of stigmatization but with leprosy receiving the more harsh form due to the visual aspects of the disease and the isolation and seclusion associated with those who have it. The study of social stigma attached to disease is still a relevant topic and as the authors referenced in this article have concluded that as time passes and understanding of the disease scientifically is gained and cures and treatments become available, the stigma associated with the disease lessens. When people understand something they cease to fear it and become more accepting. That is not to say, however, that there are not still those who hold prejudice and discriminate against those who do have contagious diseases and use it as a forum of class warfare and racism.
