= Leper colony =

Place to isolate people with leprosy

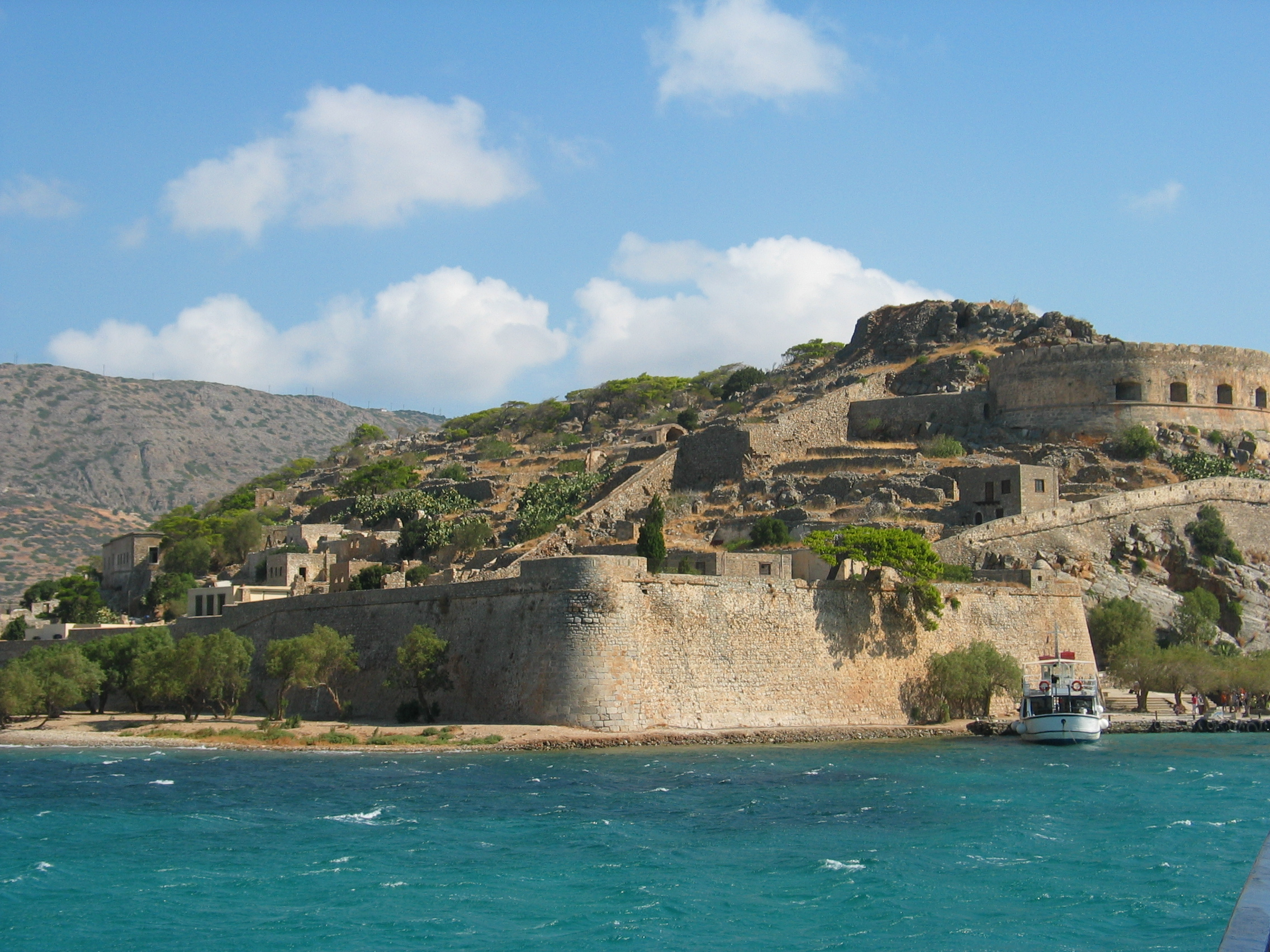
Spinalonga on Crete, Greece, one of the last leprosy colonies in Europe, closed in 1957

A leper colony, also known by many other names, is an isolated community for the quarantining and treatment of lepers, people suffering from leprosy.

M. leprae, the bacterium responsible for leprosy, is believed to have spread from East Africa through the Near East, Europe, and Asia by the 5th century before reaching the rest of the world during the Columbian Exchange. Historically, leprosy was believed to be extremely contagious and divinely ordained, leading to enormous stigma against its sufferers. Other severe skin diseases were frequently conflated with leprosy and all such sufferers were kept away from the general public, although some religious orders provided medical care and treatment. Recent research has shown M. leprae has maintained a similarly virulent genome over at least the last thousand years, leaving it unclear which precise factors led to leprosy's near elimination in Europe by 1700. A growing number of cases following the first wave of European colonization, however, led to increased attention towards leprosy during the New Imperialism of the late 19th century. Following G. A. Hansen's discovery of the role of M. leprae in the disease, the First International Leprosy Conference held in Berlin in 1897 renewed interest and investment in the isolation of people with leprosy throughout the European colonial empires.

The development of modern treatments eliminated the need to isolate people with leprosy as early as the 1940s; scientific arguments against the practice were made in the 1980s. Although Western countries now generally treat cases of leprosy individually on an outpatient basis, traditional isolated colonies continue to exist in India, China, Japan and some other countries.

== Names ==
In medieval Latin, a place for the isolation and care of people with leprosy was known as a leprosaria, leprosarium, or leprosorium, names which are sometimes used in English as well. The Latin domus leprosaria was calqued in English as leper house, with leper colony becoming by far the most common English term in the 1880s as the growing number of leprosy cases were discussed within the context of European colonialism. Less common synonyms include leper asylum, leper lodge, and leper hospital. Other names derive from the figure of Lazarus in one of Jesus's parables, treated by the Catholic Church during the Middle Ages as a historical figure and as the patron saint of both people with leprosy and the Crusader Order of Saint Lazarus, who administered the leper colony in Jerusalem before spreading to other locations. This caused leper colonies to also be known as lazar houses and, after the leper colony and quarantine center Lazzaretto Vecchio on the Republic of Venice's tiny island of Sta. Maria di Nazaret in the Venetian Lagoon, as lazarets, lazarettes, lazarettos, and lazarettas. The name leper or leprosy village is sometimes used for colonies in China, a calque of the Mandarin name máfēngcūn (t 麻風村, s 麻风村).

== History ==
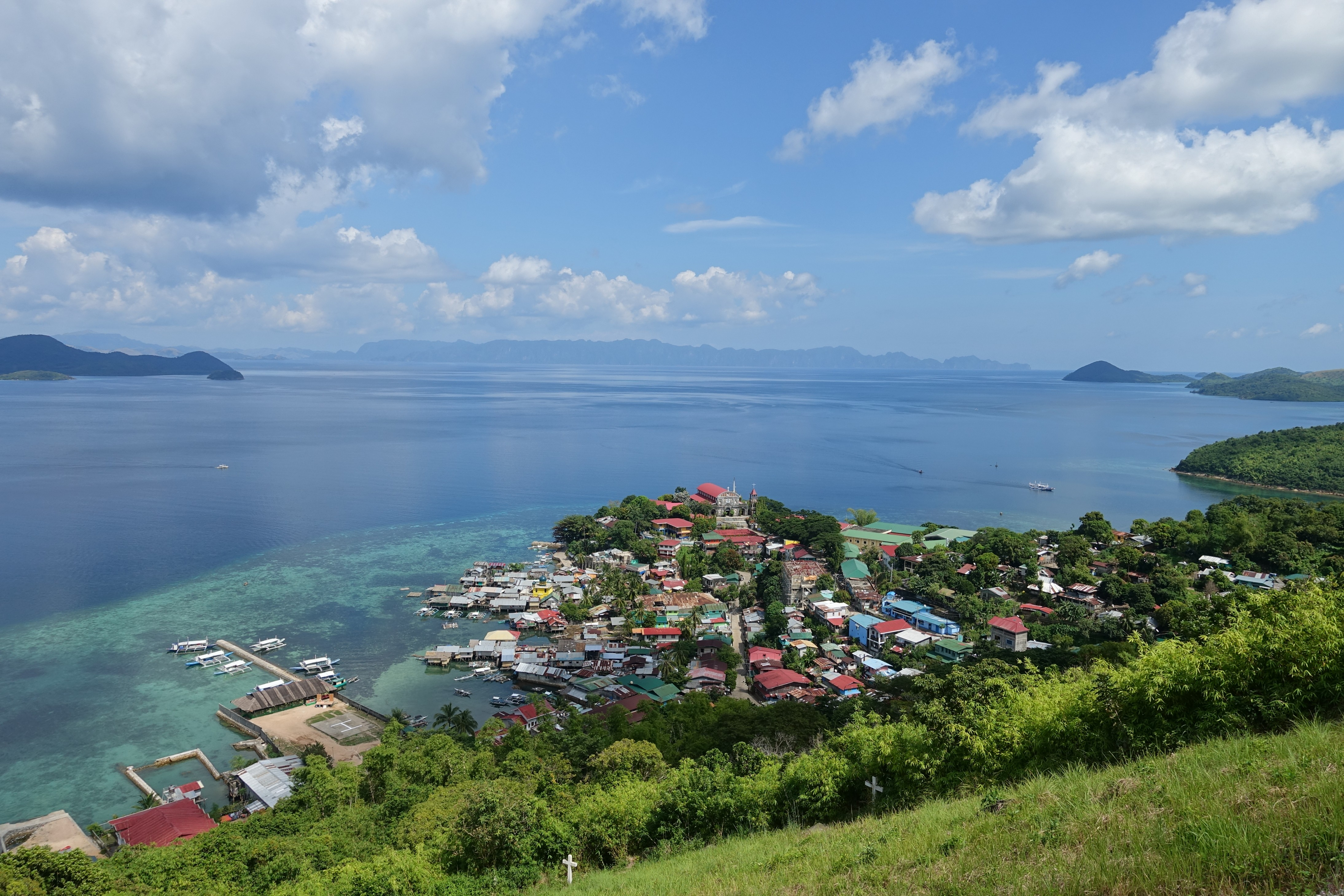
Culion leper colony in Culion old town in Palawan, Philippines used to shelter one of the largest populations of people with leprosy in Asia, numbering between 3,500–4,000.

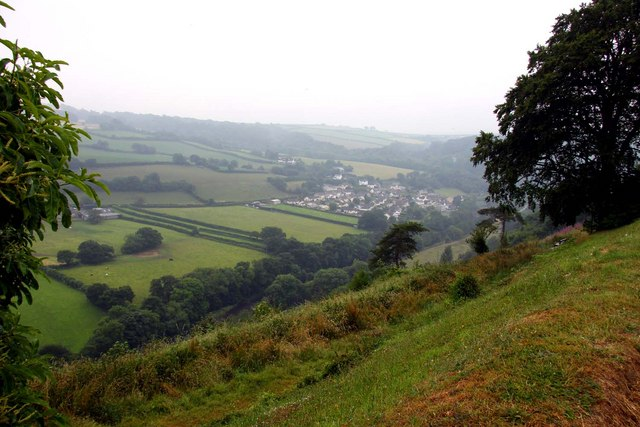
Taddiport in North Devon, England, formerly a medieval leper colony

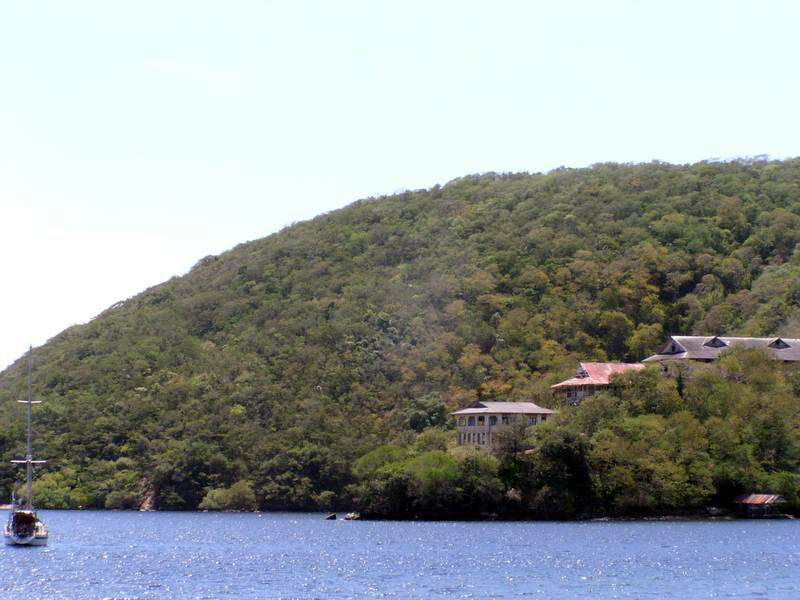
Abandoned nun's quarters at the leper colony on Chacachacare Island in Trinidad and Tobago

Although not all of the skin diseases (kushtha) discussed in the Indian Vedas and the Manusmriti were leprosy, some of them seem to have been, with the disease appearing in the subcontinent by at least 2000 BCE. The Indian religious texts and laws did not organize formal leper colonies but treated those afflicted with the disease as untouchable outcastes, forbidding and punishing any marriage with them while they suffered from the disease, which was considered both contagious and a divine retribution for sins of the sufferer's current or former life. In legend, even kings were removed from power and left to wander in the forests while suffering from leprosy, although their position could be restored in the event of their recovery, whether through divine intervention or Ayurvedic herbal remedies such as chaulmoogra oil.

Similarly, the Persians and Israelites considered certain skin diseases to render people unclean and unfit for society, without organizing any special locations for their care; it seems likely, however, that the references to leprosy in the Hebrew Bible and New Testament are the result of a misunderstanding produced by the Septuagint's Koine Greek translation and subsequent Latin translations like the Vulgate and originally referred to a variety of conditions such as psoriasis before becoming associated with leprosy centuries later. This confusion of terms—and the related divine opprobrium—was then translated into medicine in the medieval Islamic world in the 9th century. The introduction of leprosy to Southern Europe was blamed on the armies of Alexander the Great and Pompey the Great; ancient Greek and Roman physicians did not blame divine punishment and advocated various treatments but still usually advised that people with leprosy be kept out of cities. Some early Christians sought to emulate Jesus's example by personally ministering to people with leprosy or communities of lepers, activity recorded in hagiographies like Gregory of Nyssa's life of Basil of Caesarea.

Leprosy seems to have reached the rest of Europe during late antiquity and the early Middle Ages, with the Imperial Roman Christian Church reducing formal restrictions on people with leprosy while setting aside funds for leprosaria where clerics would treat the afflicted. Such leper houses are documented in the Kingdom of the Burgundians at Saint-Oyen, Savoie in 460 and in Francia in Chalon-sur-Saône in 570 and Verdun in 634 (all now in France); their management was often provided by Christian monastic orders. The area of modern Belgium alone may have had as many as 700 or 800 prior to the Crusades.

The Order of Saint Lazarus was established to care for people with leprosy in the crusader state of the Kingdom of Jerusalem and subsequently operated other leprosaria around Europe. Some colonies were located on mountains or in remote areas to ensure isolation, while others were situated on main roads, where donations would be made for their upkeep. Others were essentially hospitals within major cities. In 1623, the Congregation of the Mission of the Catholic Church, a society of apostolic life founded by Vincent de Paul, was given possession of the Priory of St. Lazarus, a former leper house in Paris, due to which the entire Congregation gained the name of "Lazarites" or "Lazarists" although most of its members had nothing to do with caring for people with leprosy.

Debate exists over the conditions found within historical colonies; while they are currently thought to have been grim and neglected places, there are some indications that life within a leper colony or house was no worse than the life of other, non-isolated individuals. There is even doubt that the current definition of leprosy can be retrospectively applied to the medieval condition. What was classified as leprosy then covers a wide range of skin conditions that would be classified as distinct afflictions today. Some leper colonies issued their own money or tokens, in the belief that allowing people affected by leprosy to handle regular money could spread the disease. Today, leper hospitals exist throughout the world to treat those afflicted with leprosy, especially in Africa, Brazil, China and India.

== Political aspects ==
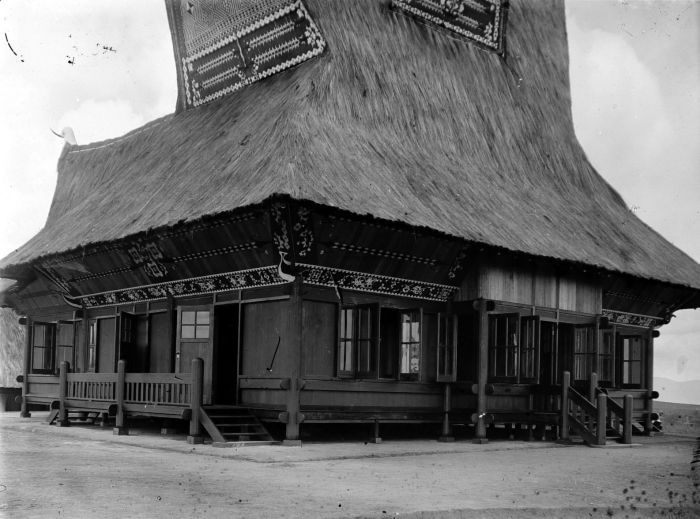
Laoe Si Momo (Spring Water) leper colony was founded on 25 August 1906, in the Batak region of Sumatra, 10 kilometers from Kaban Jahe. Within five months it was home to 72 people affected with leprosy and by April 1921 the colony included 280. The patients lived in small houses.

In 2001, government-run leper colonies in Japan came under judicial scrutiny, leading to the determination that the Japanese government had mistreated the patients, and the district court ordered Japan to pay compensation to former patients. In 2002, a formal inquiry into these colonies was set up, and in March 2005, the policy was strongly denounced. "Japan's policy of absolute quarantine... did not have any scientific grounds." The inquiry denounced not only the government and the doctors who were involved with the policy, but also the court that repeatedly ruled in favor of the government when the policy was challenged, as well as the media, which failed to report the plight of the victims.

== See also ==
- Kalawao, Hawaii
- Losheng Sanatorium
- Social distancing
