= National Leprosy Eradication Program =

Indian disease control program

National Leprosy Eradication Program is a health scheme of the Ministry of Health and Family Welfare, Government of India to eradicate leprosy in India. It was launched in 1983 as a continuation of the National Leprosy Control Program of 1955.

== History ==
The National Leprosy Control Programme (NLCP) was launched in 1955 in order to control the number of leprosy infections. In 1983, the strategies for leprosy control were changed and National Leprosy Eradication Program was launched. In the same year, multidrug therapy was also launched. In 1991, the World Health Assembly resolved to eliminate leprosy at a global level by the year 2000. In order to strengthen the process of elimination in the country, the first World Bank supported project was introduced in India in 1993 and completed in 2000. The second World Bank supported project happened between 2001 and 2002. In 2005, due to the declining number of leprosy cases, the goal of NLEP was declared as elimination of leprosy at the national level. In 2009, a special action plan for 209 high endemic districts in 16 states/union territories were made.

== Strategy ==
The strategy of NLEP are establishing a decentralized, integrated leprosy service which ensures early detection and complete treatment of leprosy. Carrying out surveys for detection of multibacillary leprosy and leprosy in children, and early diagnosis with prompt multi-drug therapy are also goals of NLEP. Involvement of ASHAs, strengthening disability prevention services and conducting health education classes are also a part of the program.
