= Simpich =

Simpich may refer to:

- Alice Louise Judd Simpich (1918–2006), American sculptor
- Frederick Simpich (1878–1950), American writer
- Simpich Character Dolls, an American doll-making company
