= Alice Louise Judd Simpich =

American sculptor

- Judd, from a 1941 newspaper
- Born: March 1, 1918; Honolulu, Hawaii, U.S.
- Died: January 21, 2006 (aged 87); Kula, Hawaii, U.S.
- Other names: Alice Banfield, Awee Simpich
- Occupation: Sculptor
- Relatives: Albert Francis Judd (grandfather); Gerrit P. Judd (great-grandfather); Laura Fish Judd (great-grandmother); Frederick Simpich (father-in-law); Francis Judd Cooke (first cousin)

Alice Louise Judd Simpich (March 1, 1918 – January 21, 2006), also known as Awee Simpich and Alice J. Banfield, was an American sculptor and clubwoman based in Hawaii, known for her portrait busts.

== Early life and education ==
Judd was born in Honolulu on March 1, 1918, the daughter of James Robert Judd and Alice Louise Marshall Judd. Her father was a surgeon, and the grandson of missionaries Gerrit P. Judd and Laura Fish Judd. Her grandfather Albert Francis Judd was chief justice of the Supreme Court of Hawaii. She attended the Punahou School and the Bennett School, and graduated from Sarah Lawrence College in 1940, with some additional studies in sculpture at Columbia University.

== Career ==
Simpich is best known for her sensitive portrait busts. She held an exhibit in 1941 at a gallery in Honolulu. In 1957 her Sleeping Faun was one of four sculptures featured in the annual exhibition of the Hawaiian Painters and Sculptors League. In addition to being a sculptor, she was president of Hui Manu ("Honolulu's bird society"), and an active member and supporter of the Maui Humane Society and the Honolulu Academy of Arts. She also played the cello. Polish-born artist Frederic Taubes painted her portrait.

== Personal life and legacy ==
Judd married Nathan Fiske Banfield III in 1942, at Kawaiaha'o Church; they had three children. Their son Nathan died from an accidental gunshot wound in 1955, and their son Michael died in 1999. Her second husband was writer and businessman Frederick Simpich Jr., the son of journalist Frederick Simpich. They married in 1955, and he died in 1975. She died at age 87 on January 21, 2006, in Kula, survived by her daughter, Louli. Her carved stone portrait bust Head of a Young Woman is installed in the John Dominis and Patches Damon Holt Gallery of the Honolulu Museum of Art.
