= Charles Hastings Judd =

Hawaiian businessman and politician (1835–1890)

The Honourable Charles Hastings Judd
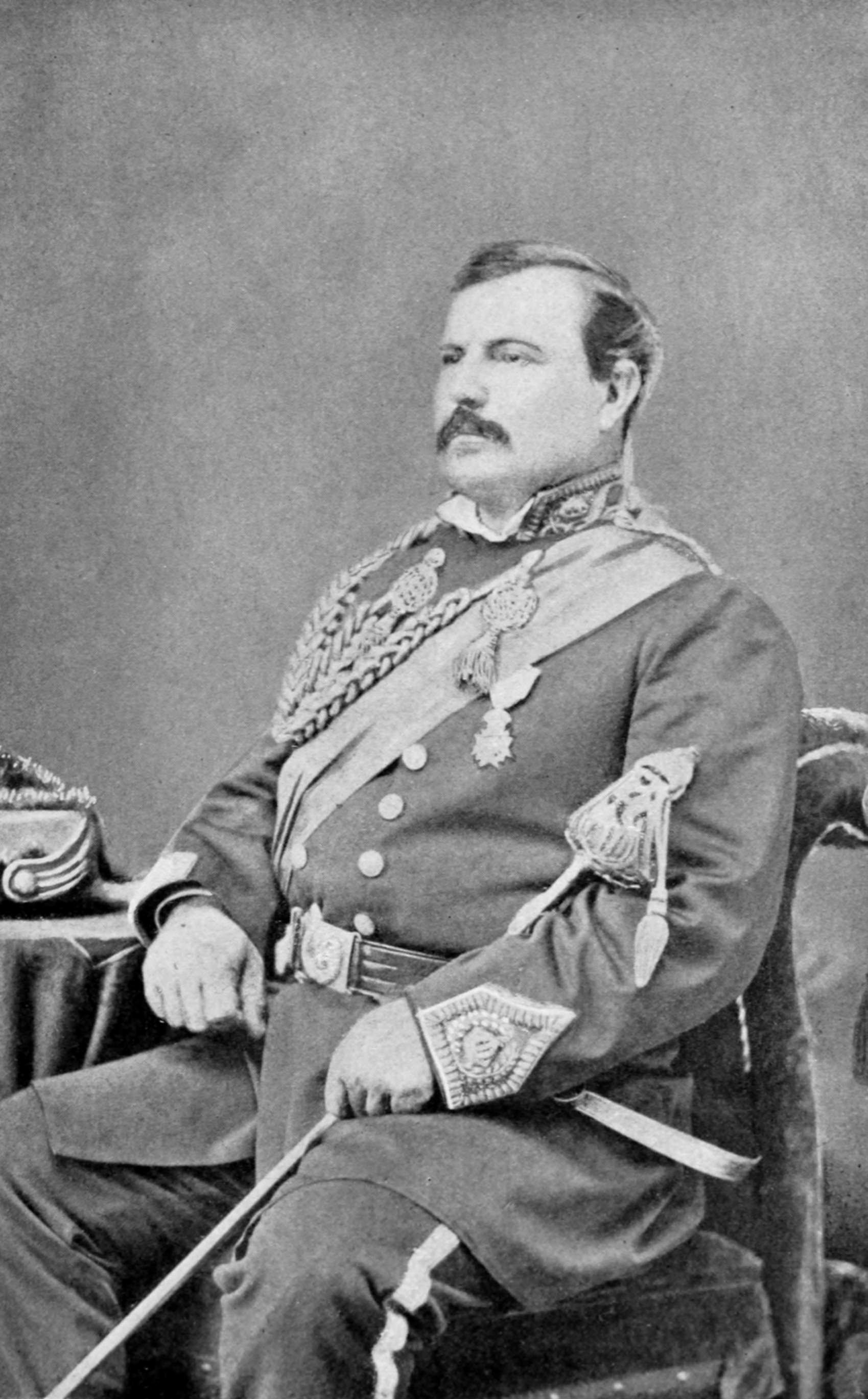

Chamberlain to the Royal Household
- In office July 6, 1878 – August 1886
- Monarch: Kalākaua

Personal details
- Born: September 8, 1835 Honolulu, Oahu, Kingdom of Hawaii
- Died: April 18, 1890 (aged 54) Kualoa Ranch, Oahu, Kingdom of Hawaii
- Resting place: Oahu Cemetery
- Spouse: Emily Catherine Cutts (m. 1859)
- Relations: Albert Francis Judd (brother)
- Children: 4
- Parents: Gerrit P. Judd; Laura Fish Judd
- Education: Punahou School; Royal School
- Occupation: Politician, businessman, rancher

Military service
- Allegiance: Kingdom of Hawaii
- Branch/service: Honolulu Cavalry; Royal Household Guards; King's Staff
- Years of service: 1863–1886
- Rank: Colonel; Adjutant general; Major; Captain

Colonel Charles Hastings Judd (September 8, 1835 – April 18, 1890) was a Hawaiian businessman, rancher, courtier and politician who was born, lived, worked and died in the Kingdom of Hawaii. He served as chamberlain and colonel of the military staff of King Kalākaua and traveled with the monarch on his 1881 world tour.

== Early life ==
Charles Hastings Judd was born September 8, 1835, at the Old Mission Home across the street from the modern Hawaiian Mission Houses Historic Site in Honolulu. He was the fourth child and second son of American missionaries Gerrit P. Judd and Laura Fish Judd. Charles' younger twin sister was also named Laura Fish Judd (1835–1888) and his father, who had worked as a missionary physician, resigned his post to work as a political advisor and cabinet minister to King Kamehameha III. Charles' younger brother Albert Francis Judd served as Chief Justice of the Hawaii Supreme Court.

Judd was educated at Punahou School from 1842 to 1849 before attending the Royal School when the children of cabinet ministers were admitted to the institution. His classmates included fellow missionary descendant William Nevins Armstrong and the future King Kalākaua, both of whom developed a lifelong friendship with Judd during their childhood. From 1854 to 1856, Judd returned to Punahou and traveled with his mother and two sisters to the United States via the Isthmus of Panama to visit his relatives in 1855.

== Business career ==
From 1859, Charles Judd engaged in guano mining for the American Guano Company on Jarvis Island and Baker Island, which were made American possession by the Guano Islands Act of 1858. On November 1, 1859, he married Emily Catherine Cutts of Portsmouth, New Hampshire, in Honolulu. Cutts was in Hawaii to visit her aunt Catherine Whitney, wife of Henry Martyn Whitney. The Judds lived on Baker Island from 1860 to 1861 and served as an agent for the American Guano Company.

After returning to Oahu, Judd and his brother-in-law Samuel Gardner Wilder engaged in agriculture and purchased plantations on the island's eastern coast, including Kualoa, which was previously owned by Judd's father, and Kaalua, where they grew tobacco, cotton, rice, and sugarcane. This venture ended in 1871. Judd also partnered in ranching with John Adams Cummins at Waimānalo. In 1866, Judd purchased Rosebank, the Honolulu residence of Robert Crichton Wyllie, and resettled in the city with his family.

== Political and military career ==
Charles Judd served in many political and court posts during the monarchy. He worked a number of governmental jobs as commissioner of private ways and water rights, marriage license agent, commissioner of fences in Oahu, and tax collector for Koolaupoko. In 1868, Judd was elected to the House of Representatives in the Legislature of the Kingdom of Hawaii and served during the sessions from 1868 to 1873. He also held many honorary military ranks in the Hawaiian military; he was appointed Captain of the Honolulu Cavalry in 1863 and elevated to the rank of Major in 1866 during the reign of Kamehameha V. After his election to the House of Representatives, Lunalilo appointed Judd a colonel on his military staff and Judd served as adjutant general of the Household Guards. On September 7, 1873, the Royal Guards mutinied at ʻIolani Barracks due to their resentment of Judd and the Hungarian drillmaster Captain Joseph Jajczay. Unable to control their subordinates, Judd and Jajczay were beaten and attacked by the angry troops and a demand for their removal was sent to the king. Lunalilo responded by disbanding the military unit, leaving Hawaii without a standing army for the remainder of his reign.

After Lunalilo's death and the monarchical election of 1874 that followed, Judd openly supported Queen Dowager Emma's candidacy for the throne against Kalākaua but switched sides after Kalākaua's victory over Emma in the legislative vote, which gained him the distrust of the king's sister Liliuokalani. During the reign of Kalākaua, in 1874, Judd was reappointed to the King's Staff as a colonel. Kalākaua also appointed Judd to serve on his Privy Council of State, the monarch's advisory council. On September 8, 1879, he was appointed a member of the House of Nobles, the upper house of the legislature, and served in this legislative post during the session from 1880 to 1886. He also served as Commissioner of Crown Lands from 1878 and member of the Board of Health from 1880. On July 6, 1878, he was appointed the King's Chamberlain and served as his private secretary. Edward William Purvis served as his vice-chamberlain.

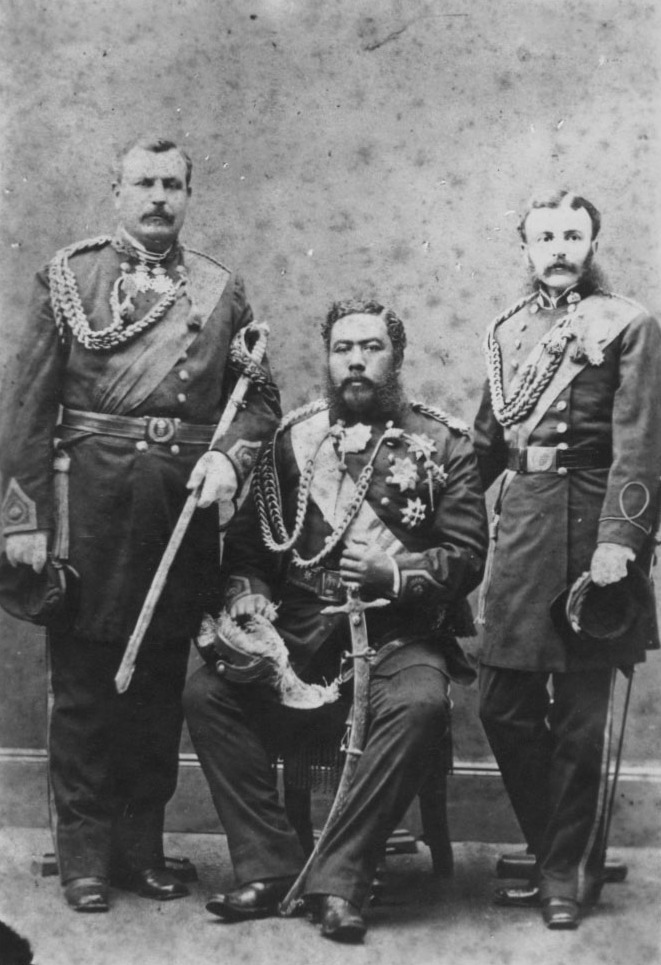
Colonel Judd (left) with King Kalākaua (center) and Colonel George W. Macfarlane (right)

In this capacity, Judd traveled with Kalākaua on his 1881 world tour along with their childhood classmate Armstrong and Colonel George W. Macfarlane, the king's aide-de-camp. Judd's dark complexion and physical resemblance to Kalākaua led a few people, including Qing politician Li Hongzhang to mistake him for a Native Hawaiian, and the 5th Earl Spencer mistook him for the king. According to the Evening Star, a Washington, D. C. newspaper, "Col. Judd looks very much like Kalakaua, except that he wears a moustache simply. He was born in the islands, of New York parentage, but is burned as brown as a nut."

During this trip, Judd received many decorations from foreign governments. Along with Kalākaua, he was made an honorary member of the Pacific Yacht Club in Sausalito, California. In Japan, he was bestowed with the Order of the Rising Sun. Judd was voted into the Freemasonry brotherhood at Perseverance Lodge No 1165 in Hong Kong and was bestowed with the masonry third degree at the Lodge Zetland in the East, No. 548, in Singapore. In Siam, he received the Knight Grand Cross of the Crown of Siam, Third Class. At the 1883 coronation of Kalākaua and Kapiolani, Judd served as Lord High Chamberlain while his wife served as lady-in-waiting to the queen.

After a disagreement about the king's increased expenditure, Judd was removed from the office of Chamberlain in August 1886. This was stated as a resignation in public announcements but Judd had been removed by the administration of Prime Minister Walter M. Gibson for disagreeing with Gibson's cabinet. Curtis P. Iaukea was appointed to succeed Judd as Chamberlain to the Royal Household. Judd regarded his removal from office as a "defection of the king, a lifelong friend, [which] preyed upon his mind with devastating effect and his health".

Judd resigned from politics, and devoted his time to business and managing property. He moved his family from Honolulu to the Leilehua Ranch house, which he co-owned with the king, and in 1889 to the Kualoa Ranch, where he died on April 18, 1890. He was buried at Oahu Cemetery in Honolulu.

== Family and descendants ==
Charles Judd married Emily Catherine Cutts (March 19, 1840 – May 2, 1921) on November 1, 1859, and they had four children:

1. Julie Judd (November 26, 1860 – September 2, 1941), who married Francis Mills Swanzy, managing director of Theo H. Davies & Co. on November 9, 1887, at Honolulu. They had three children.
2. Helen "Haunani" Judd (May 5, 1862 – January 7, 1935), who married Arthur Christopher Farley on March 9, 1882, at Boston. They lived in New England had four children.
3. Emily Pauahi Judd (January 13, 1864 – February 13, 1948), who remained unmarried.
4. Charles Hastings Judd II (September 3, 1868 – January 25, 1942) married (1) Mary Makalehua Roberts on June 22, 1890, at Kualoa; (2) Louisa Hart on December 24, 1903, at Waimea; (3) Florence Bush Lincoln on November 6, 1915, at Honolulu. He had three children from his first marriage and seven children from his second marriage.

== Bibliography ==
- Allen, Helena G. (1982). The Betrayal of Liliuokalani: Last Queen of Hawaii, 1838–1917. Glendale, CA: A. H. Clark Company. ISBN 978-0-87062-144-4. OCLC 9576325.
- Armstrong, William N. (1904). Around the World with a King. New York: F. A. Stokes Company. OCLC 489773.
- Carter, George Robert; Hopkins, Mary H. (1922). A Record of the Descendants of Dr. Gerrit P. Judd of Hawaii, March 8, 1829, to April 16, 1922. Genealogical Series, no. 3. Honolulu: Hawaiian Historical Society. OCLC 13190207.
- Hawaii (1918). Lydecker, Robert Colfax (ed.). Roster Legislatures of Hawaii, 1841–1918. Honolulu: Hawaiian Gazette Company. OCLC 60737418.
- Kalakaua (1971). "Royal Tourist – Kalakaua's Letters Home from Tokio to London". Hawaiian Journal of History. Hawaiian Historical Society. hdl:10524/186.
- Kuykendall, Ralph Simpson (1953). The Hawaiian Kingdom 1854–1874, Twenty Critical Years. Vol. 2. Honolulu: University of Hawaii Press. ISBN 978-0-87022-432-4. OCLC 47010821.
- Kuykendall, Ralph Simpson (1967). The Hawaiian Kingdom 1874–1893, The Kalakaua Dynasty. Vol. 3. Honolulu: University of Hawaii Press. ISBN 978-0-87022-433-1. OCLC 500374815.
- Liliuokalani (1898). Hawaii's Story by Hawaii's Queen, Liliuokalani. Boston: Lee and Shepard. ISBN 978-0-548-22265-2. OCLC 2387226.
- Marumoto, Masaji (1976). "Vignette of Early Hawaii-Japan Relations: Highlights of King Kalākaua's Sojourn in Japan on His Trip around the World as Recorded in His Personal Diary" (PDF). The Hawaiian Journal of History. 10. Hawaiian Historical Society: 52–63. hdl:10524/291. Archived from the original (PDF) on June 26, 2020.
- Pogány, András H. (1963). "Joseph Jajczay, Captain of the Hawaiian King's Bodyguard". The Hungarian Quarterly. 4 (1–2). Budapest: 53–61. OCLC 18822542.
