= Charles Coffin Harris =

American judge (1822–1881)

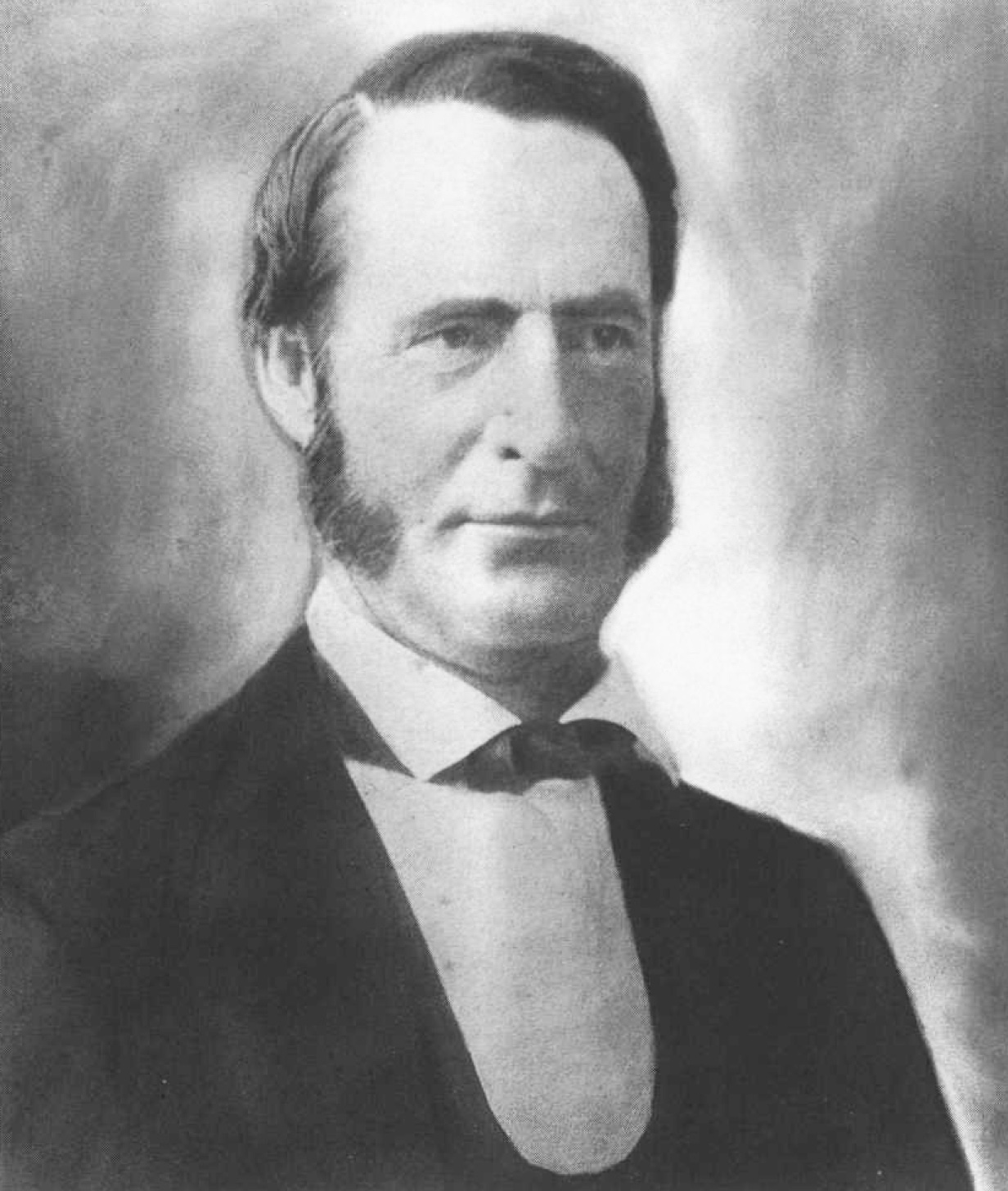

Attorney General of The Kingdom of Hawaiʻi
- In office August 26, 1862 – December 21, 1865
- Monarch: Kamehameha IV
- Succeeded by: Stephen Henry Phillips

Minister of Finance of The Kingdom of Hawaiʻi
- In office December 21, 1865 – December 21, 1869
- Preceded by: Charles de Varigny
- Succeeded by: John Mott-Smith

Minister of Foreign Affairs of The Kingdom of Hawaiʻi
- In office December 21, 1869 – August 25, 1872
- Preceded by: Charles de Varigny
- Succeeded by: Ferdinand W. Hutchison

Chief Justice of the Supreme Court of The Kingdom of Hawaiʻi
- In office February 1, 1877 – July 2, 1881
- Monarch: Kalākaua
- Preceded by: Elisha Hunt Allen
- Succeeded by: Albert Francis Judd

Personal details
- Born: June 9, 1822 Newington, New Hampshire, United States
- Died: July 2, 1881 (aged 59) Honolulu, Oahu
- Resting place: Oahu Cemetery
- Children: 2
- Education: Harvard
- Occupation: Lawyer, Diplomat

Charles Coffin Harris (1822–1881) was a New England lawyer who became a politician and judge in the Kingdom of Hawaii who firmly supported the monarchy as an independent nation. After serving in a number of cabinet posts, he became chief justice of the supreme court.

== Early life ==
Charles Coffin Harris was born June 9, 1822, in Newington, New Hampshire. His father was educator William Coffin Harris (1788–1853) and mother was Mary Johnson. After studying in his father's school in Portsmouth, New Hampshire, he enrolled at Harvard in 1837 and graduated in 1841 when only 19 years old. He taught school for a few years in Portsmouth.

On January 31, 1844, Harris married cousin Harriet Miller Harris, and in 1847 moved to Boston to teach at the Chauncey Hall School while studying law. In 1849 he and two brothers Thomas and Abel sailed to join the California Gold Rush. On a trip to the Hawaiian Islands to obtain produce to sell in California, he stayed behind for what he thought would be a short visit. Younger brother Thomas Aston Harris (born 1824) went on to a career in the steamship business, and served in the American Civil War. Another younger brother Robert Harris (1830–1894) became president of the Chicago Burlington Railroad and then the Northern Pacific Railway.

== Lawyer in Hawaii ==
In September 1850 when the Hawaiian Princes Alexander and Lot returned from their trip the United States and Europe, they encouraged Harris to become a lawyer in their kingdom. Harris decided to settle in Honolulu, and on September 23, 1850, became a naturalized citizen of the Kingdom of Hawaii. He sent for his wife and young son who arrived in early 1852. Besides his private law practice, he became a police magistrate for minor offenses in 1852. In 1853, King Kamehameha III was seriously considering annexation by the US, since the islands had been invaded several times by European powers during his reign. Harris instead advocated a free trade treaty while keeping Hawaii a sovereign state. The young princes were less attracted to American influence, because they were subject to racial discrimination in the US, while treated like royalty in Europe.

In 1861 Harris bought Kahuku Ranch, on Hawaiʻi Island. It included vast tracts of land of about 300,000 acres (1,200 km^{2}) on the southern slopes of Mauna Loa. For a few years the family shipping business produced furniture stuffing called pulu from a soft fern that grew in Kahuku. Some time in the 1860s Harris tried to develop an early sugarcane plantation that is now Kaneohe Ranch on the east coast of Oahu with Queen Dowager Kalama. The venture was not a success, but he was able to get title to the Kaneohe land as well.

== In the government ==
In 1854 Harris was elected to the house of representatives of the legislature of the Hawaiian Kingdom, and was re-elected until 1862. On August 26, 1862, King Kamehameha IV (former Prince Alexander) appointed him as Attorney General of Hawaii, a post effectively vacant since John Ricord had left in 1847. On November 30, 1862, Harris officially became a member of the Church of Hawaii branch of Anglican Church by new Bishop Thomas Nettleship Staley, two days after the king and queen. This further irritated the conservative Americans who were descended from the early missionaries identified with the Congregational Church.

Harris also was appointed a member of the Privy Council on December 7, 1863, by King Kamehameha V, the former Prince Lot. In 1864 he was appointed to the upper House of Nobles in the legislature. Kamehameha V insisted on a new 1864 Constitution of the Kingdom of Hawaii, restoring some of the power to the monarchy that had been lost through the years. Harris issued his legal opinion that the king had such a right, and produced an early draft. A constitutional convention failed to reach agreement, so Harris got the cabinet to negotiate directly with Kamehameha V who accepted the result which lasted 23 years. On December 21, 1865, he was appointed instead as minister of finance for the next four years. Although he resigned as attorney general, he acted in that capacity until a new one (fellow New Englander Stephen Henry Phillips) was appointed in September 1866.

Mark Twain visited the islands in 1866, and published several widely read letters to The Sacramento Union newspaper. Harris was one of Twain's favorite targets of ridicule, describing Harris:

His oratory is all show and pretense; he makes considerable noise and a great to do, and impresses his profoundest incoherencies with an impressive solemnity and ponderous windmill gesticulations with his flails.

On March 30, 1867, Harris was made an envoy to the US to help negotiate the treaty he had long advocated. He met former Civil War General Edward M. McCook who was the United States Minister to Hawaii, in San Francisco. They drew up and signed a treaty on May 21, 1867. The ratification of this treaty by the Hawaii legislature was delayed because the presence of the American warship USS Lackawanna was seen as a show of force. Harris in the meanwhile proceeded to Washington, D.C., where he found the United States Senate did not have the two-thirds vote needed to ratify the treaty. Harris returned to Honolulu when congress recessed on in July, 1868. On December 21, 1869, he was shuffled from minister of finance to minister of foreign affairs as Charles de Varigny returned to France.

With the king's influence, he was an investor with fellow American politician John Mott-Smith in the first Hawaiian Hotel in 1872. The government issued bonds to finance its construction after Harris bought the land for the site. It was converted to a YMCA in 1917. In 1926 the building was finally torn down, and it is now the site of the Hawaii State Art Museum. On August 25, 1872, Harris was replaced as foreign minister.

On the death of Kamehameha V at the end of 1872 without naming an heir, the constitution specified an election of a new ruler by the legislature. Harris backed David Kalākaua, who lost the election. The new liberal King Lunalilo had no use for Harris in his cabinet, but died just a year later. On February 18, 1874, King Kalākaua won the next election and appointed Harris to the supreme court of the Kingdom. In 1875, he was awarded the Royal Order of Kamehameha I and the Royal Order of Kalākaua decorations. On February 1, 1877, he became chief justice of the supreme court when Elisha Hunt Allen resigned as he was sent back to work out details of the Reciprocity Treaty of 1875. Harris kept this office until his death.

== Death and legacy ==
His first wife died in March 1870; they had a son Frank Hervey Harris (1845–1875) and a daughter Nannie Roberta Harris, who married John Dominis Brewer (1845–1879) in 1872 and after his death, David Rice of Boston. Her first husband was a son of the namesake company C. Brewer & Co. Frank worked as tax collector and notary public on Oahu, until he purchased the sugarcane plantation at ʻŌʻōkala (later called the Kaiwiki Sugar Company) in 1869.

On May 1, 1879, he married Ella Fessenden Tiffany, daughter of his predecessor Elisha Hunt Allen. He died in Honolulu on July 2, 1881, leaving a large estate. Although his health had been declining, he worked until the day before his death. After an official state funeral in Saint Andrew's Cathedral on July 5, he was buried in Oahu Cemetery.

Although often remembered outside of Hawaii by Twain's satiric attacks, at his death Harris was honored even by former political opponents such as William Richards Castle, Alfred S. Hartwell, and Albert Francis Judd. Some historians speculate that Harris was a model for the character from New England who becomes active in a medieval kingdom in Twain's novel A Connecticut Yankee in King Arthur's Court. However, in Harris' case, he fought to preserve the monarchy, not overthrow it.

Judd, who followed him as chief justice, said:

Much of what had been distrusted during the trying days of the Constitutional Convention of 1864, time has proved were plans laid more wisely than the actors knew, for the strengthening and centralizing of the authority of this Government, so essential to the security of life, liberty, and prosperity of this land.

Kahuku Ranch was bought by Alfred Wellington Carter as part of Parker Ranch after the unsustainable harvest of pulu quickly collapsed. In the 1950s part of it became the enormous subdivision called Hawaiian Ocean View Estates. After becoming part of the Samuel Mills Damon estate, another large section was sold to expand Hawaii Volcanoes National Park in 2003, and some remains as a tourist accommodation.

== See also ==
- Relations between the Kingdom of Hawaii and the United States
- List of bilateral treaties signed by the Kingdom of Hawaii

Government offices
Preceded by Vacant	Kingdom of Hawaii Attorney General; 1862–1865 (acting 1866)	Succeeded by Stephen Henry Phillips
Preceded by Charles de Varigny	Kingdom of Hawaii Minister of Finance; 1865–1869	Succeeded by John Mott-Smith
Preceded by Charles de Varigny	Kingdom of Hawaii Minister of Foreign Affairs; 1869–1872	Succeeded by Ferdinand W. Hutchison
Preceded by Elisha Hunt Allen	Kingdom of Hawaii Chief Justice; 1877–1881	Succeeded by Albert Francis Judd
Diplomatic posts
Preceded by Elisha Hunt Allen	Envoy Extraordinary to U.S. 1867–1869	Succeeded by Elisha Hunt Allen
