= Stephen Henry Phillips =

American politician

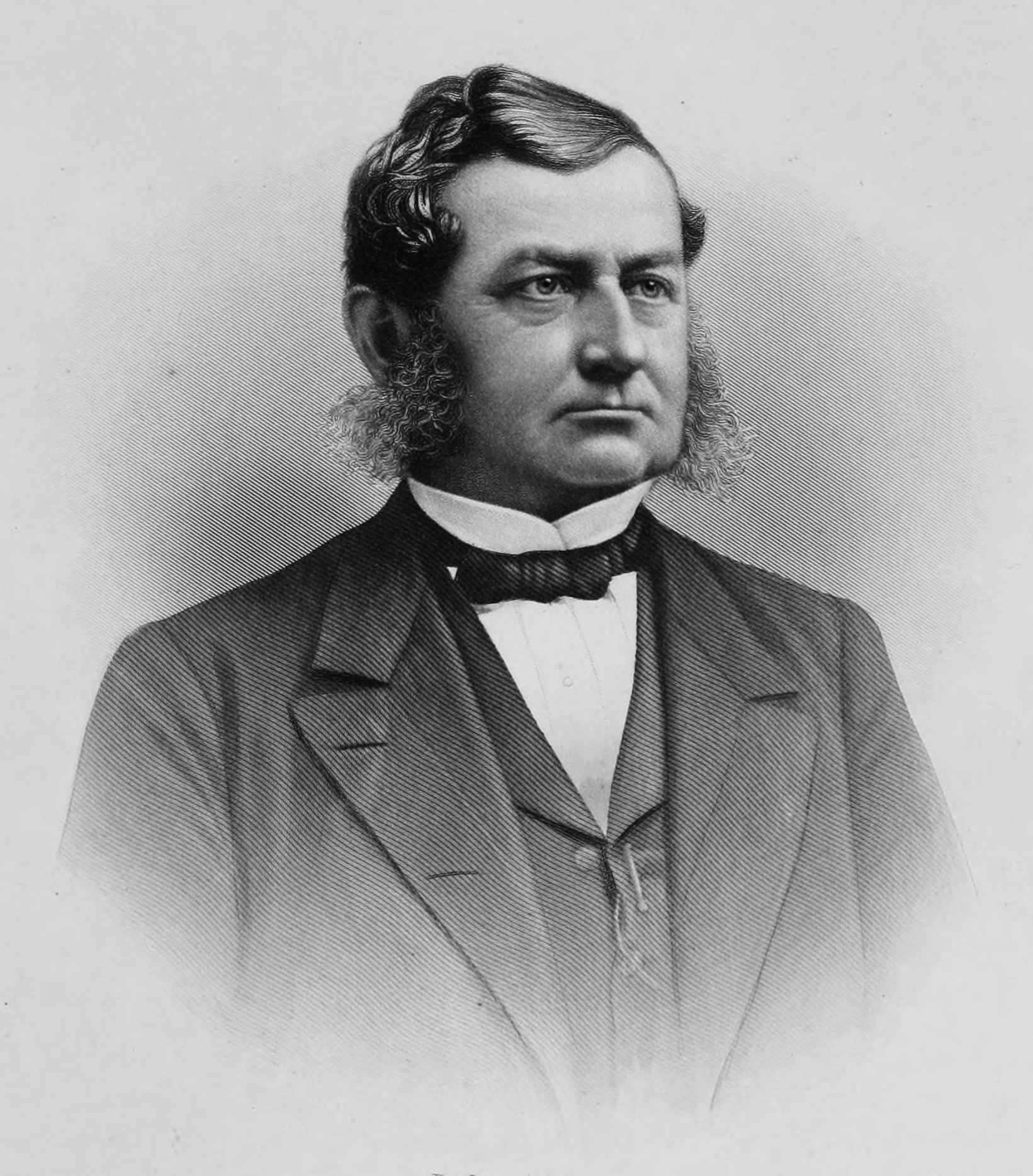
- Stephen Henry Phillips, engraving by Alexander Hay Ritchie, 1887

12th Massachusetts Attorney General
- In office 1858–1861
- Governor: Nathaniel Prentice Banks
- Preceded by: John H. Clifford
- Succeeded by: Dwight Foster

Attorney General of The Kingdom of Hawai'i
- In office September 12, 1866 – January 10, 1873
- Succeeded by: Albert Francis Judd

Minister of Foreign Affairs of The Kingdom of Hawaii
- In office July 18, 1868 – December 31, 1869
- Preceded by: Charles de Varigny
- Succeeded by: Charles Coffin Harris

Personal details
- Born: August 16, 1823 Salem, Massachusetts, U.S.
- Died: April 8, 1897 (aged 73) Salem, Massachusetts, U.S.
- Party: Republican

Stephen Henry Phillips (August 16, 1823 – April 9, 1897) was an American lawyer who served as the Attorney General of Massachusetts and the Kingdom of Hawaii and as the Minister of Foreign Affairs and on King Kamehameha V's Privy Council.

== Early life ==
Phillips was born August 16, 1823, in Salem, Massachusetts. He was the eldest son of Jane Appleton (Peele) Phillips and politician Stephen C. Phillips (1801–1857). Phillips was a descendant of Rev. George Phillips of Watertown, the progenitor of the New England Phillips family in America.

Phillips studied at various private schools in Salem, New York, and Washington, D.C. He entered Harvard University in 1838 when only 15 years old, graduating in 1842, as a member of Alpha Delta Phi and Phi Beta Kappa. Phillips then studied law at the Harvard Law School. One of his teachers there was Joseph Story, who was on the Supreme Court of the United States at the time.

== Massachusetts politics ==
From 1851 to 1853, Phillips was the district attorneys of Essex County, Massachusetts. He was a delegate to the 1856 Republican National Convention, its first, which was held in Philadelphia. He was Attorney-General of the state of Massachusetts from 1858 to 1861. Phillips was also a delegate to the 1864 Republican National Convention which re-nominated Abraham Lincoln for president.

== Hawaiian Islands ==
A fellow student at Harvard was William Little Lee (1821–1857) who had helped draft the 1852 Constitution of the Kingdom of Hawaii and served as chief justice of the supreme court until his early death. In 1866 Phillips was invited by King Kamehameha V to come to Honolulu, where he became an officer of the government of the Kingdom of Hawaii. He was appointed as Hawaii's attorney general and as a member of the king's Privy Council . He was appointed to the House of Nobles in the legislature of the Hawaiian Kingdom in 1867, and attended sessions in 1868, 1870, and 1872.

Phillips temporarily acted as minister of foreign affairs in the cabinet from July 18, 1868, to December 31, 1869, while Charles de Varigny was in France trying to negotiate a treaty. On December 31, 1869, Charles Coffin Harris became minister of foreign affairs. Phillips returned to marry Margaret Duncan on October 3, 1871, in Haverhill, Massachusetts. She was daughter of another politician, James H. Duncan (1793–1869).

== Back to the mainland ==
After the death of Kamehameha V, the new king Lunalilo chose a new council and cabinet, and in January 1873 Phillips resigned his posts and moved to San Francisco. He was replaced by Albert Francis Judd as attorney general. In San Francisco he practiced law for the Equitable Life Insurance company and the California state board of railroad commissioners. In 1881 he moved back to his home state in Danvers, Massachusetts. He died on April 8, 1897.

Legal offices
| Preceded by John H. Clifford | Attorney General of Massachusetts; 1858–1861 | Succeeded by Dwight Foster |
| Preceded by Asahel Huntington | District attorney of Essex County, Massachusetts; 1851–1853 | Succeeded by Alfred A. Albert |
