= Senator Judd =

Senator Judd may refer to:

- Albert Francis Judd Jr. (1874–1939), Hawaiian territorial Senate
- Norman B. Judd (1815–1878), Illinois State Senate
- Stoddard Judd (1797–1873), Wisconsin State Senate
