= Bernice Judd =

American Hawaiian librarian (1903–1971)

- Born: October 18, 1903; Honolulu, Territory of Hawaii (now Hawaii, United States)
- Died: March 12, 1971 (aged 67); Honolulu, Hawaii, U.S.
- Burial place: Oʻahu Cemetery, Honolulu, Hawaii, U.S.
- Father: Albert Francis Judd Jr.
- Relatives: Albert Francis Judd (paternal grandfather); Alfred S. Hartwell (maternal grandfather); Gerrit P. Judd (great-grandfather); Lawrence M. Judd (uncle)

Bernice Judd (October 18, 1903 – March 12, 1971) was an American and Hawaiian librarian. She was a historian and scholar of Hawaiiana, and worked as a librarian at the Hawaiian Mission Children's Society from 1929 until 1962.

== Life and career ==
Bernice Judd was born on October 18, 1903, in Honolulu, Territory of Hawaii. Her parents were Madeline Perry (née Hartwell) and Albert Francis Judd Jr., a lawyer. Her maternal grandfather was judge Alfred S. Hartwell. Her paternal grandfather was judge Albert Francis Judd, and her great-grandfather was missionary medical doctor Gerrit P. Judd.

She worked as a librarian from 1929 until 1962 at the Hawaiian Mission Children's Society, a historical and memorial society of descendants of Protestant missionaries associated with the American Board of Commissioners for Foreign Missions (ABCFM) to the Hawaiian Kingdom. Judd wrote multiple articles and books, and was a scholar of the history and culture of Hawaii. Her notable book was Voyages to Hawaii Before 1860; A Study Based On Historical Narratives In The Library Of The Hawaiian Mission Children's Society (1929), which was expanded and updated in 1974.

Judd was profiled in the book, Notable Women of Hawaii (1984) by Barbara Bennett Peterson.

== Publications ==
=== Books ===
- Judd, Bernice (1929). Voyages to Hawaii Before 1860; A Study Based On Historical Narratives In The Library Of The Hawaiian Mission Children's Society (1st ed.). Honolulu, Hawaii: Hawaiian Mission Children's Society Library.
- Judd, Bernice (1938). Hawaiian Language Imprints, 1822–1899: A Bibliography.
- Judd, Bernice (1974). Lind, Helen Yonge (ed.). "Voyages to Hawaiʻi Before 1860: A Record Based on Historical Narratives in the Libraries of the Hawaiian Mission Children's Society & the Hawaiian Historical Society, Extended to March 1860" (2nd revised ed.). Honolulu, Hawaii: University Press of Hawaii for the Hawaiian Mission Children's Society. ISBN 0824803299.

=== Articles ===
- Judd, Bernice (November 1, 1952). "Review: The Magnificent Matriarch: Kaahumanu, Queen of Hawaii , by Kathleen Dickenson Mellen". Pacific Historical Review. 21 (4): 400–401. doi:10.2307/3635643. ISSN 0030-8684.
