= Alfred S. Hartwell =

American judge

Alfred Stedman Hartwell
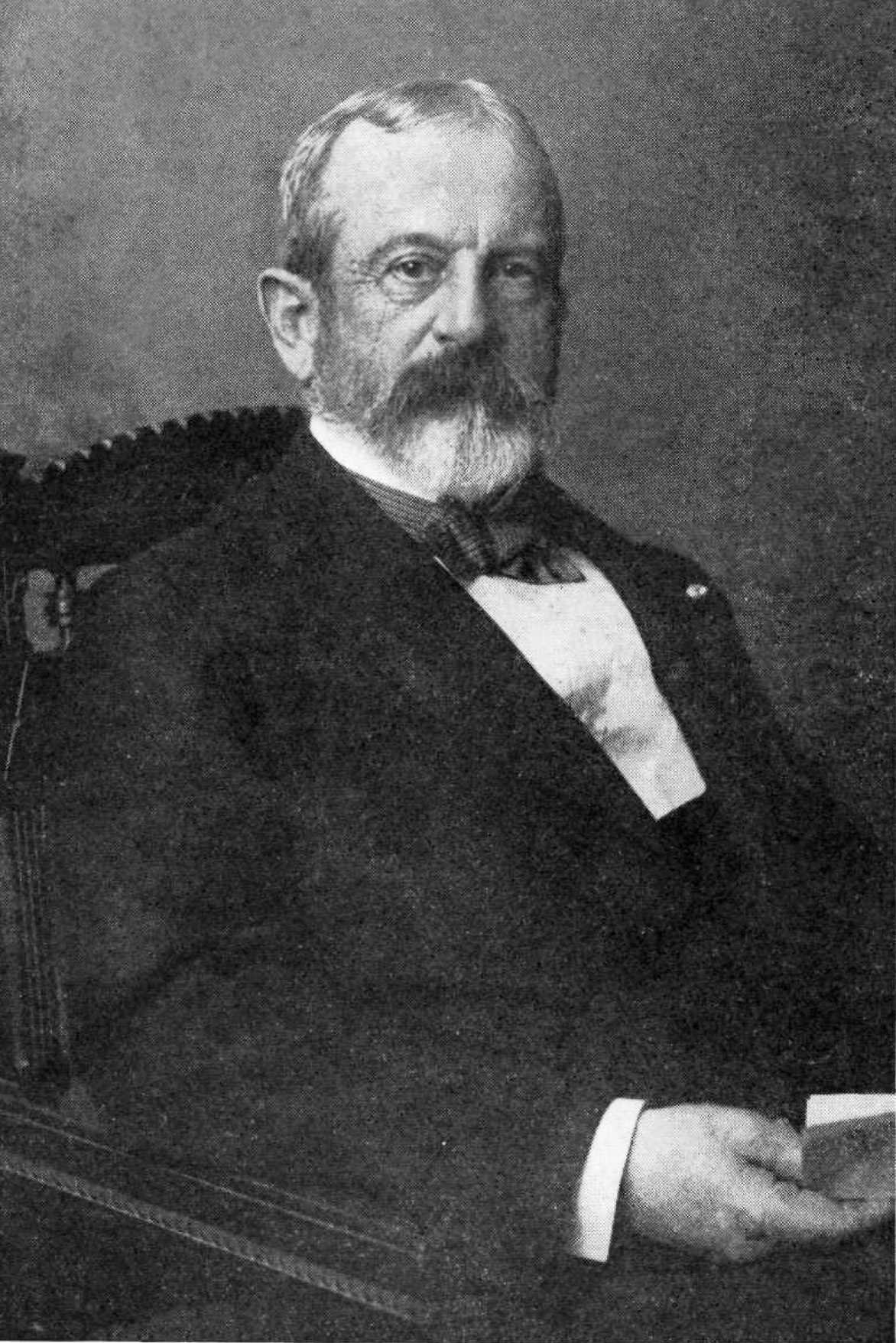
- Alfred S. Hartwell
- Born: June 11, 1836; Natick, Massachusetts
- Died: August 30, 1912 (aged 76); Honolulu
- Occupations: Soldier, judge, lawyer
- Spouse: Charlotte Elizabeth "Lottie" Smith
- Children: 8
- Relatives: Melicent Knapp Smith (mother-in-law), Albert Francis Judd (son-in-law), Bernice Judd (granddaughter)

Alfred Stedman Hartwell (June 11, 1836 – August 30, 1912) was a lawyer and American Civil War soldier, who then had another career as cabinet minister and judge in the Kingdom of Hawaii.

== Early life and education ==
Alfred Stedman Hartwell was born June 11, 1836, in Natick, Massachusetts. His father was Stedman Hartwell (1800–1872) and mother was Rebecca Dana Perry (1805–1872).

He graduated from Harvard University in 1858 where he was elected into Phi Beta Kappa society.

== Career ==
He moved to St. Louis, Missouri, and worked as an instructor at Washington University.

=== Civil War ===
In April 1861, at the outbreak of the American Civil War, he enlisted as Corporal in the Third Missouri Reserve regiment. Missouri was officially neutral but supporters of the Confederacy had captured Liberty Arsenal, and his company was called up to help recapture the weapons. This resulted in the Camp Jackson Affair.

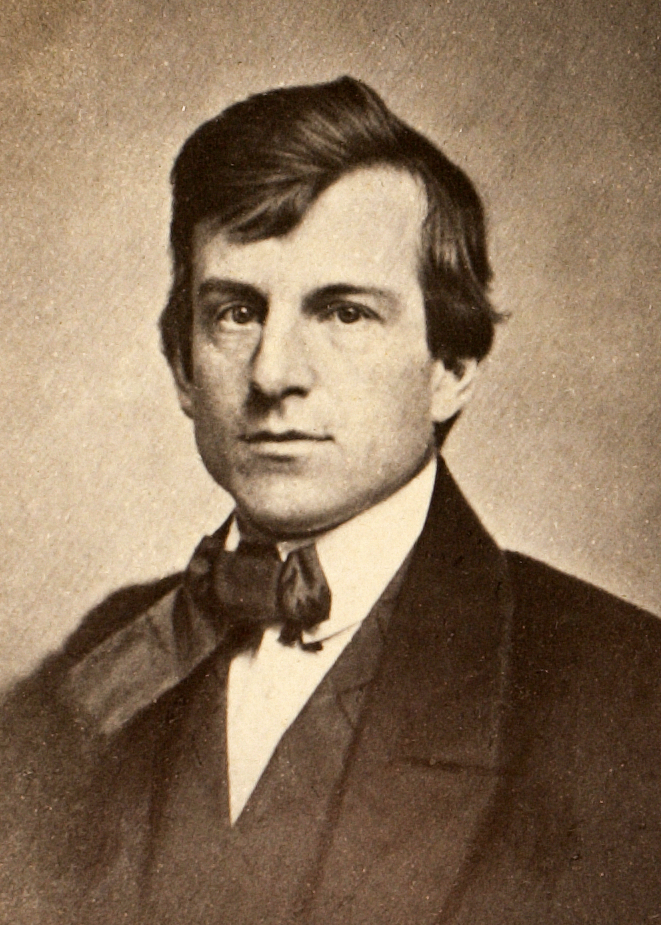
1858 Harvard graduation photo

In June he returned to Boston and enrolled in Harvard Law School, but by September 1862 became a first lieutenant in the 44th Massachusetts regiment. When the United States Colored Troops (USCT) were formed for African-American recruits, he was promoted to captain on March 31, 1863, of the 54th Massachusetts. However, the number of volunteers was higher than expected, so he was promoted to lieutenant colonel, and helped organize the 55th Regiment Massachusetts Volunteer Infantry under command of Norwood Penrose Hallowell. The 54th's role in the Second Battle of Fort Wagner was depicted in the film Glory. The 55th moved into their former barracks, and was ordered to embark in July 1863. They served building trenches on Folly Island supporting the siege of Charleston, South Carolina. When Hallowell had to resign for treatment of an old wound, Hartwell was promoted to command the regiment on November 3, 1863.

Morale became a problem when his troops discovered that despite being promised the same pay as their white counterparts, they had a major deduction for a "clothing allowance". Hartwell complained to his commanding officers, and suggested promoting African-American troops to officers. On May 24, 1864, he commissioned John Freeman Shorter to be a second lieutenant, but it was refused by General John Porter Hatch. He protested up to the Secretary of War and threatened to resign, until the pay issue was settled in August 1864.

In the Battle of Honey Hill on November 30, 1864, he commanded a brigade that included the 55th and 54th Massachusetts and the 102nd USCT. He was wounded and had his horse shot from under him leading three charges. Captain Thomas F. Ellsworth received the Congressional Medal of Honor because "Under a heavy fire [Ellsworth] carried his wounded commanding officer [Hartwell] from the field." The battle was generally a failure, but proved another example where the African-American troops could be used in battle. On January 23, 1865, President Abraham Lincoln nominated Hartwell for the award of the honorary grade of brevet brigadier general, to rank from December 30, 1864, for gallant services at the battle of Honey Hill. The U.S. Senate confirmed the award on February 14, 1865.

On January 30, 1865, he rejoined his brigade, and in February 1865 he commanded the brigade in an attack on James Island, South Carolina (see Battle of Grimball's Causeway). After a few skirmishes, both sides retreated. After the fall of Charleston, he marched his forces through the city, with the African-American troops at the head of his brigade. They occupied the city and dealt with the large number of refugees.

On April 5, 1865, he commanded another combined force that marched through Charleston again, although by now the Confederate army was generally dispersing. Their duties now were mostly peace-keeping and rebuilding bridges. On May 1 his units were based in Orangeburg, South Carolina, and finally in June his promotions of black officers were finally approved. In August the 55th was taken out of service. However, Hartwell was sent to investigate Milton S. Littlefield who was accused of fraud (known as the "Prince of carpetbaggers").

=== Boston ===
He was finally discharged on April 30, 1866. He returned to Boston, and was elected to the legislature of Massachusetts as a Republican. After the war he finished his last year of law school and graduated with an LLB degree from Harvard in 1867. He briefly started a law practice in Boston with classmate Samuel Craft Davis. On August 15, 1868, he left at the suggestion of fellow Massachusetts lawyer Elisha Hunt Allen, intending to spend a year or two on an adventure to the Hawaiian Islands.

=== Hawaii ===
He was appointed by King Kamehameha V to the supreme court of the Kingdom of Hawaii on the day he landed, September 30, 1868.

There were so few trained lawyers in Hawaii, one of the other supreme court justices, Hermann A. Widemann, had never been to law school. Elisha Hunt Allen was still acting as chief justice, despite living in the United States much of the time.

He rented a room at Washington Place from Mary Dominis. Also living there was John Owen Dominis who was Governor of Oahu, and his wife Lydia, the future Queen Liliʻuokalani. He quickly learned the Hawaiian language and by December 1868 was instructing juries as a circuit court judge without an interpreter. At the time, the supreme court was trial court for several kinds of cases, handled appeals, and its judges acted as circuit judges on other islands.

In 1873 he hosted a visit of some other former civil war generals, including John Schofield, Rufus Ingalls and Barton S. Alexander, when they investigated the use of Pearl Harbor as a naval base. As King Lunalilo was dying, Hartwell advised him to name a clear successor, assuming it would be Queen Emma of Hawaii. However, Lunalilo died before naming an heir to the throne, resulting in a political crisis when the popular Emma was not elected.

Hartwell was appointed Attorney General by King Kalākaua on February 18, 1874, replacing Albert Francis Judd (who moved onto the court), but was replaced on May 28. On December 5, 1876, he was appointed again, replacing William Richards Castle. This time he served until July 3, 1878, when he went into private practice. Hartwell suspected that Claus Spreckels had him removed because Hartwell was opposed to Spreckels' plans to license water rights for his sugarcane plantations. In 1883 he closed his practice and traveled back to Boston, but returned to Hawaii in 1885.

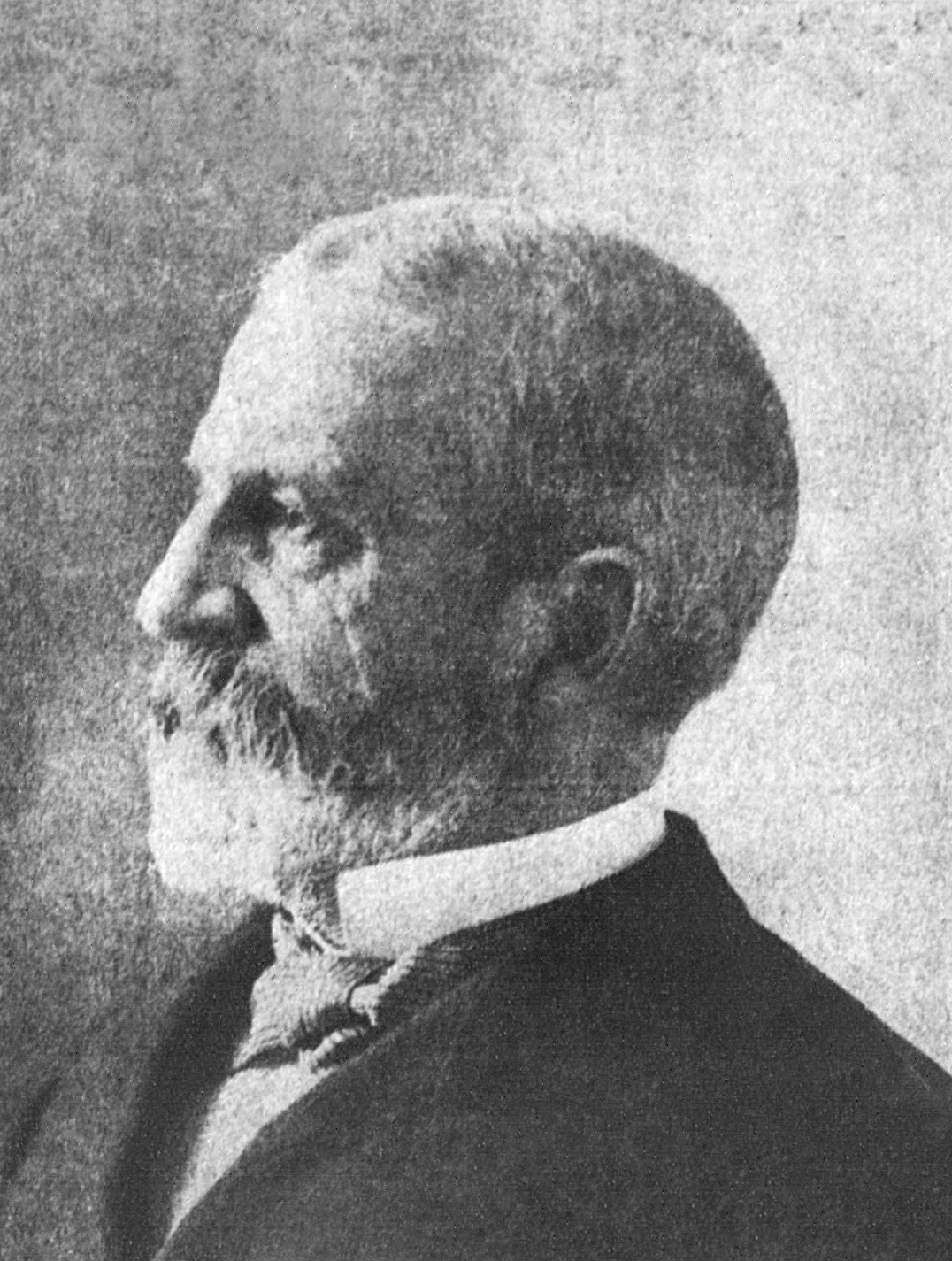
Alfred S. Hartwell in later life

In late 1890 he traveled to Washington, D.C., to negotiate on a cable connection between Hawaii and west coast of the United States. Although he did not support the overthrow of the Kingdom of Hawaii, he did lobby for its annexation to the US. In 1899 he traveled to Washington, D.C., as unofficial representative until Robert William Wilcox was elected. On the same trip he attended the International commercial congress in Philadelphia. In 1895 Hartwell wrote the document signed by Liliʻuokalani in which she agreed to abdicate, avoiding death sentences for those (including herself) convicted after the 1895 Counter-Revolution in Hawaii. Liliʻuokalani remained bitter about what she saw as a former friend working for her enemies.

He formed a law firm with Lorrin Andrews Thurston, one of the leaders of the overthrow, and then added his assistant William F. L. Stanley. In 1901 he was hired to challenge the income tax in the Hawaii territorial court. His daughter's brother-in-law George Robert Carter became Territorial Governor of Hawaiʻi in 1903. On June 15, 1904, he was appointed again to the Supreme Court of what was now the US Territory of Hawaii, and became chief justice August 15, 1907. He replaced Walter F. Frear who in turn replaced Carter as Governor.

On March 9, 1911, he resigned and left in June for a vacation in Europe, but became ill in London and returned to Hawaii.

== Personal ==
His younger brother, Charles Atherton Hartwell (1841–1876) served under Major General Nathaniel P. Banks. In 1865 Charles was brevetted Brigadier General US Volunteers for gallant services during the war. Charles died in Castroville, Texas in 1876. Hartwell named his only son in honor or his younger brother, Charles Atherton Hartwell.

He married Charlotte Elizabeth "Lottie" Smith (1845–1896) on January 10, 1872, in Kōloa on Kauaʻi island. Her parents were missionary physician James William Smith and teacher Melicent Knapp Smith, who arrived in 1842 to Hawaii. Her brother was lawyer William Owen Smith (1848–1929) who later joined him in law practice. They had eight children:

1. Daughter Mabel Rebecca Hartwell was born April 5, 1873, and married Alfred Townsend in 1897.
2. Daughter Edith Millicent Hartwell was born May 25, 1874, and married Alfred Wellington Carter (1867–1949) in 1895.
3. Daughter Madeline Perry Hartwell was born May 26, 1875, and married Albert Francis Judd, Jr. in 1899, son of Albert Francis Judd, and grandson of Gerrit P. Judd.
4. Daughter Charlotte Lee Hartwell was born October 22, 1876, and married Charles Henry Chater.
5. Daughter Juliette Hartwell was born July 27, 1879, and married Olaf L. Sorenson on May 18, 1912.
6. Son Charles Atherton Hartwell was born November 5, 1880, and married Cordelia Judd Carter (1876–1921), daughter of Henry A. P. Carter, cousin of A. W. Carter, and granddaughter of Gerrit.
7. Bernice Hartwell was born August 15, 1882.
8. Alice Dorothy Hartwell was born July 27, 1884, and married Ferdinand Frederick Hedemann in 1927.

For his honeymoon the couple traveled first to San Francisco in February 1872, where he found out his father had died on his wedding day. When they arrived in Natick, his mother was also ill, and they stayed until she died on June 11, 1872. They returned and rented a house in Honolulu in August 1872.

== Death ==
He died in Honolulu on August 30, 1912, and was buried in Oahu Cemetery.

== Ancestry ==
He is a direct descendant of James Atherton, one of the First Settlers of New England; who arrived in Dorchester, Massachusetts in 1630s. His paternal grandmother was Rachel Atherton.

== See also ==
- List of Massachusetts generals in the American Civil War
- Massachusetts in the American Civil War
- Alfred Stedman Hartwell papers (1862-2003) at the State Library of Massachusetts

Government offices
Preceded by Albert Francis Judd	Kingdom of Hawaii Attorney General; February–May 1874	Succeeded by Richard H. Stanley
Preceded by William Richards Castle	Kingdom of Hawaii Attorney General; December 1876 – July 1878	Succeeded by Edward Preston
Legal offices
Preceded by Walter F. Frear	Territory of Hawaii Supreme Court Chief Justice; August 1907 – March 1911	Succeeded by Alexander G. M. Robertson
