= Melicent Knapp Smith =

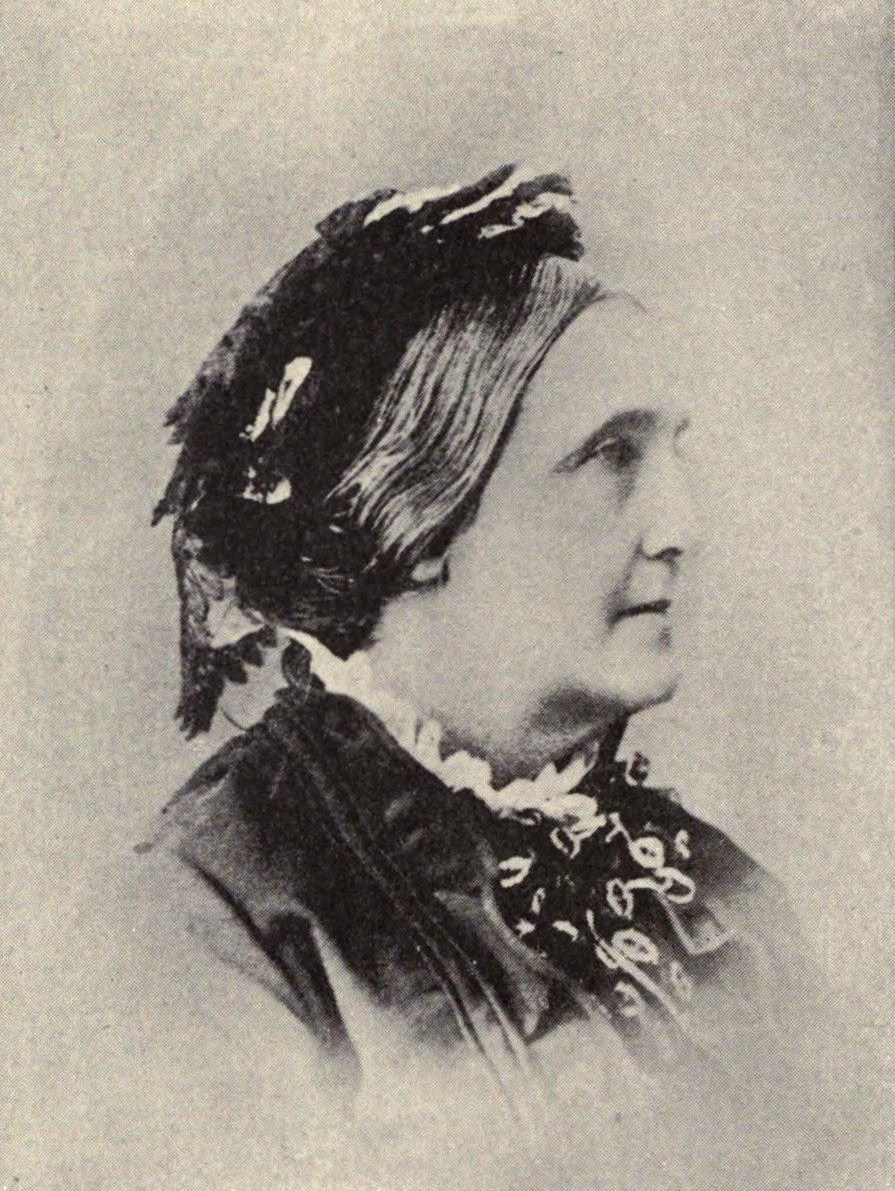
- Melicent Knapp Smith, 1880
- Born: Melicent Knapp; October 15, 1816; Greenwich, Connecticut
- Died: September 24, 1891 (aged 74); Koloa, Hawaii
- Occupation(s): Educator, Missionary
- Spouse: James William Smith (m. 1841)

Melicent Knapp Smith (October 15, 1816 – September 24, 1891) was an American educator and Christian missionary in the Hawaiian Islands. She was a member of the Tenth Company sent to the islands by the American Board of Commissioners for Foreign Missions in 1841.

== Early life ==
Melicent Knapp was born in Greenwich, Connecticut, the daughter of Jared Knapp and Mary Owen Knapp. Her brother Horton Owen Knapp (1813–1845) was also a missionary in Hawaii, preceding her by five years.

== In Hawaii ==
Melicent Knapp arrived in Hawaii with her new husband, a medical missionary, in 1842, as a member of the Tenth Company sent by the American Board of Commissioners for Foreign Missions (ABCFM). They were stationed at Koloa, Hawaii on the island of Kauai. She looked after their congregation and household, and provided hospitality for the wives and children of visiting sea captains, while her husband treated patients all over the island. She started and operated the Koloa Boarding School for Girls, teaching with two of her daughters, Emma and Lottie, from 1861 until 1871. She also taught Bible study and sewing classes for Hawaiian women.

== Personal life ==
Melicent Knapp married physician James William Smith in 1841. They had nine children born between 1843 and 1857, including William Owen Smith (1848–1929), Jared Knapp Smith (1849–1897), and Melicent Philena Smith Waterhouse (1854–1943). Two daughters, both named Mary, died in infancy. Melicent Knapp Smith was widowed in 1887 and died in 1891 in Koloa, aged 74 years. Her gravesite is in the churchyard at Koloa Union Church. The Smith Family papers are archived at the Kauai Historical Society.

Alfred S. Hartwell was one of Melicent Knapp Smith's sons-in-law. Her descendants included grandson Alfred Herbert Waterhouse (1877–1948). The Koloa Scholarship Fund was established in memory of James William Smith, Melicent Knapp Smith, Jared Knapp Smith, Alfred Waterhouse, and Mabel Plamer Waterhouse.
