= Albert Francis Judd Jr. =

American politician

Albert Francis Judd Jr
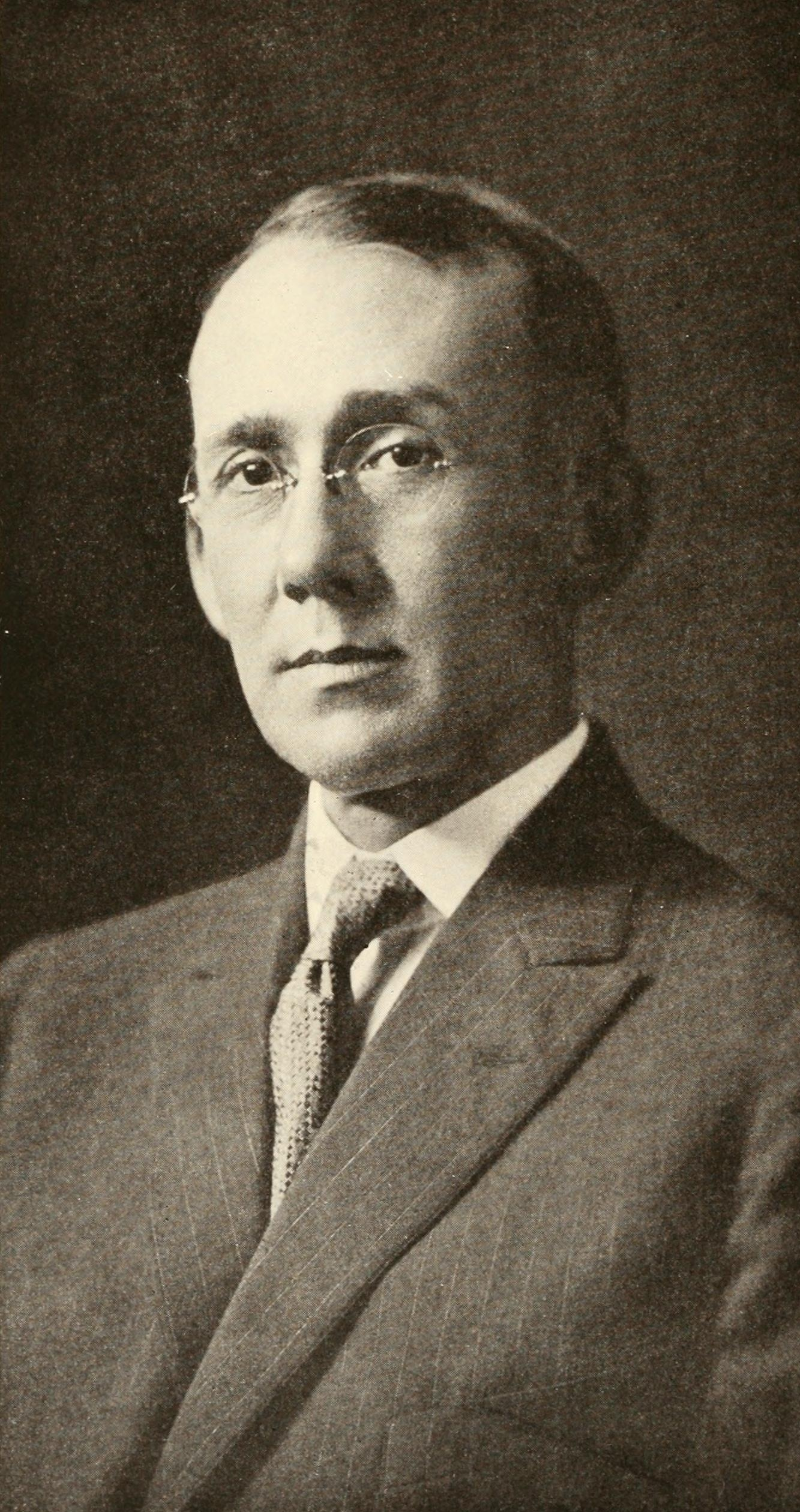

Personal details
- Born: December 20, 1874 Honolulu, Territory of Hawaii, United States
- Died: December 18, 1939 (aged 64)
- Spouse: Madeline Perry Hartwell
- Children: 4, including Bernice Judd
- Occupation: Lawyer, Trustee

Albert Francis Judd Jr. (1874–1939) was an American lawyer and trust officer in the Territory of Hawaii.

== Personal life ==
Judd was born December 20, 1874, in Honolulu. His father was Albert Francis Judd (1838–1900) and mother Agnes Hall (Boyd) Judd. His grandfather was Gerrit P. Judd (1803–1873).

Judd attended Oahu College (now known as Punahou School) in Honolulu in 1892. He later attended Yale College, where he joined Alpha Delta Phi and received his bachelor's degree in 1897. He continued on to Yale Law School, receiving his Bachelor of Laws degree in 1900.

Judd married Madeline Perry Hartwell, daughter of judge Alfred S. Hartwell, in Honolulu on July 21, 1899. They had four children: a son who died young in 1901, Bernice Judd born October 18, 1903, Dorothy Judd born April 8, 1906, and Albert Francis Judd, 3rd Born March 15, 1909.

His brother Lawrence McCully Judd was born March 20, 1887, and became Governor of the Territory of Hawaii in 1929–1934.

== Professional life ==
Judd practiced law in Honolulu from 1899 through 1914. He was founding secretary of the Benevolent and Protective Order of Elks lodge in Honolulu, but resigned about a month after the first meeting.

He served as trustee for the endowment of the Kamehameha Schools, trustee of the Bernice P. Bishop Museum, and Charles R. Bishop Trust.

From 1903 to 1905, he served as member of the Commission compiling the laws of Hawaii. From 1904 to 1906 he served as local magistrate in Honolulu. In 1906, he went to Manila for the Hawaiian Sugar Planters' Association, where he lobbied the Philippine government to allow the first Ilocano laborers to work on sugar plantations in Hawaii. He was elected to the Hawaiian territorial Senate from the third district on Oʻahu, and chairman of the judiciary committee, during the legislative sessions of 1911 and 1913. In 1923 to 1926, and again from 1933 to 1935, he was again on the commission to compile and revise laws of the territory.

Yale awarded him an honorary Master of Arts degree in 1934.

Judd died December 18, 1939.
