= Henry Crosnier de Varigny =

French Physician

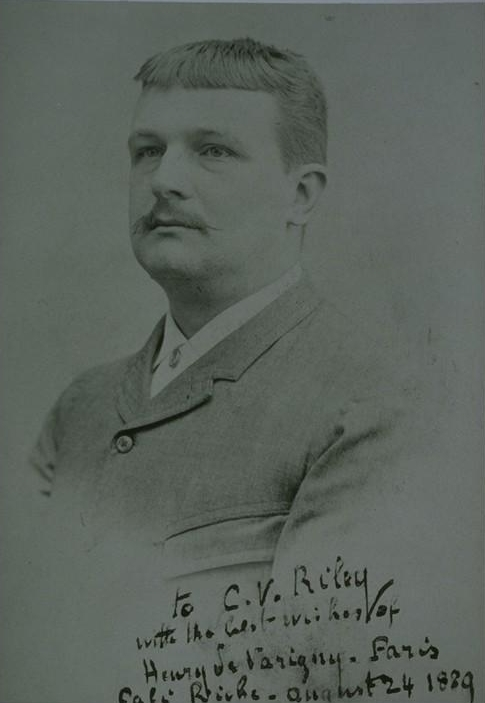
Carte-de-visite photograph, 1889, given to the entomologist C.V. Riley. From the US Department of Agriculture archives.

Henry Crosnier de Varigny (13 November 1855 – 27 September 1934) was a French physician, naturalist, journalist, and a writer of popular science books. He was a staunch evolutionist and wrote a biography of Darwin as well as a book on the evolution of life. He was very interested in psychology and was among the first to examine the phenomenon of synesthesia, having examined a patient who associated sounds with colours. Crosnier de Varigny was born in Honolulu, the son of French consul Charles Crosnier de Varigny. He grew up in Hawaii from 1855 to 1869 learning many languages. He studied the natural sciences in Paris. He completed his doctorate in medicine in 1886 studying under Charles Richet. He became known for his books popularizing science, including translations from other languages. During the Chicago World's Fair of 1893 he went to the United States and visited several American zoological parks and institutions including the Smithsonian and the entomology bureau of the Department of Agriculture. He had a keen interest in psychology and wrote on the use of dreams for medical diagnostics, and had an interest in the phenomenon of synesthesia. He had examined a case where a patient heard colours and took part in one of the first symposiums on synesthesia in 1889.

Around 1888 he worked in the comparative pathology laboratory of Auguste Chauveau (1837–1917). He wrote a biography of Charles Darwin in 1889 with an analysis of his letters. In 1891 he was sent to study public instruction in England and in 1894 he sought a position for popular education established by the Hôtel de Ville de Paris but this did not come through and he then took up scientific journalism and writing. He edited a scientific column in the newspapers Le Temps and Journal des débats.

Henry married Blanche Meyrueis in 1889.

== Honors and Awards ==
Officer of the Order of the Legion of Honour
