= Simpich Character Dolls =

Simpich Character Dolls, Ltd.
- Company type: Private company
- Industry: dollmaker
- Founded: 1952
- Founder: Bob and Jan Simpich
- Headquarters: Colorado Springs, Colorado

Simpich Character Dolls, Ltd. was a Colorado Springs, Colorado-based company that produced dolls. It was founded in 1952. For part of its existence, its owners, Jan and Bob Simpich, built their products in home workshops. Bob and Jan Simpich, announced their retirement for February 2007, and the closing of their studio in the Old Colorado City Historic Commercial District.

The Simpiches made their first dolls from found materials because they needed inexpensive Christmas gifts.

The dolls themselves range from historical figures, to literary characters like Huckleberry Finn and Alice in Wonderland to mythological ones, and the most consistently popular are the Christmas-themed dolls.

Simpich hanging angels were one of the early creations, begun in 1954. Butch and Suzie were the first two. Over 70 angels were created between 1952 and 2007. Some angels, like Pete and Taffy, were made for many years, while others were in production only a few years and then suspended to allow new angels to be made. Due to everything being handmade, the shop could only create so many at any one given time. Pete, a mischievous angel with a slingshot, was their most popular angel.
