= Laura Fish Judd =

American missionary and historian

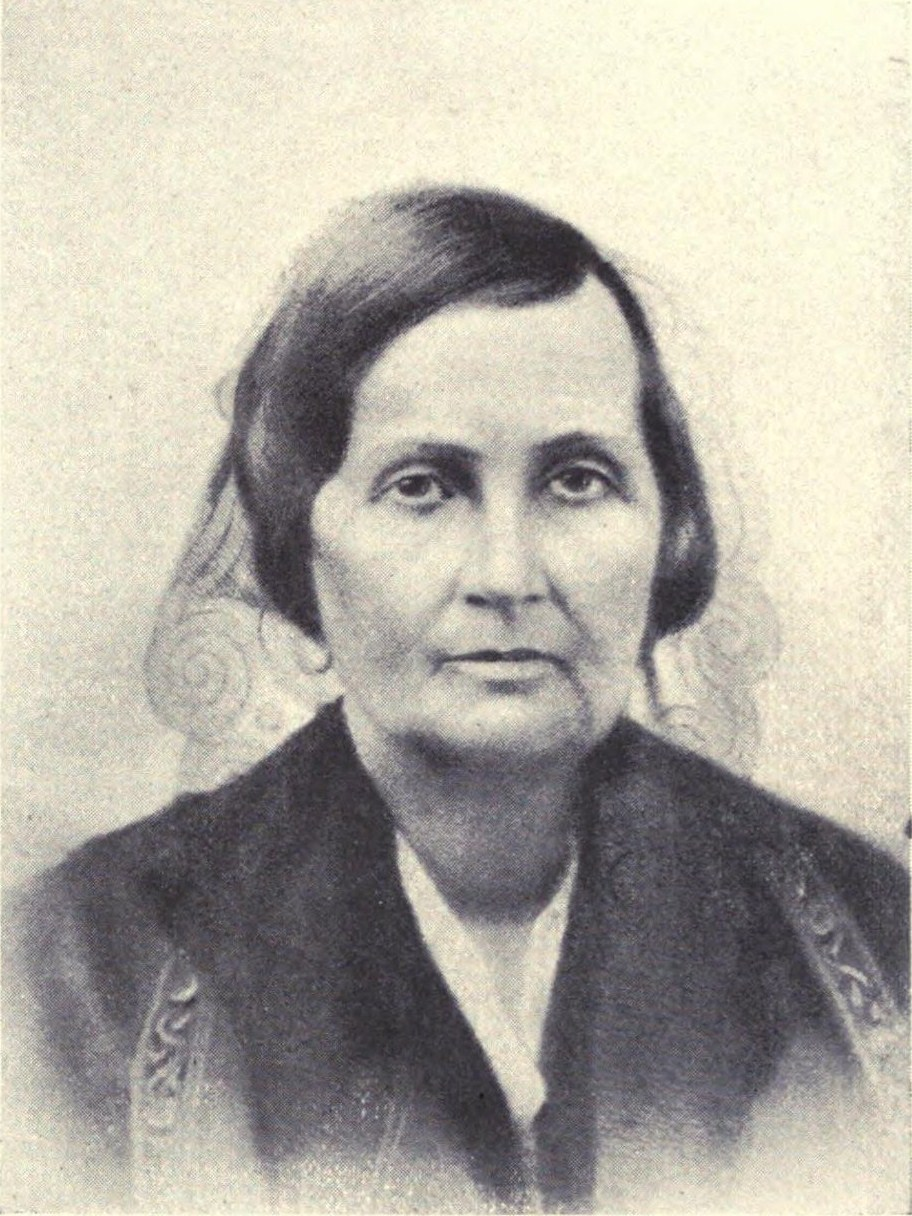
- Born: Laura Fish; April 2, 1804; Plainfield, New York, United States
- Died: October 2, 1872 (aged 68); Honolulu, Kingdom of Hawaii
- Occupations: Missionary, teacher
- Spouse: Gerrit P. Judd (m. 1827)
- Children: 9, including Charles Hastings and Albert Francis

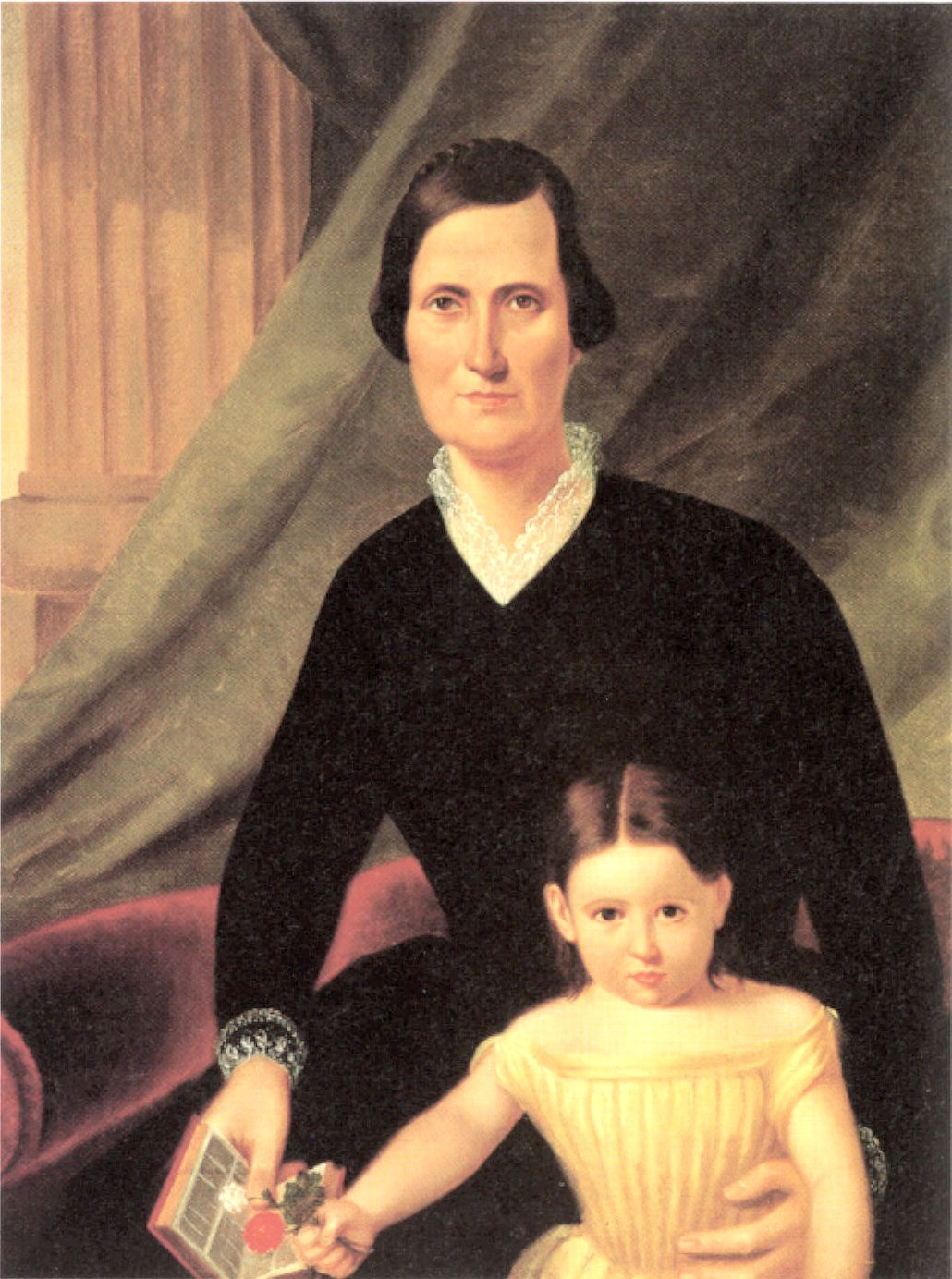
'Mrs Gerrit P. Judd and her Daughter Juliet Isabel', oil on canvas painting by James Gay Sawkins, 1850, Mission Houses Museum (Honolulu)

Laura Fish Judd (April 2, 1804 – October 2, 1872) was an American missionary, teacher and historian noted for her works on the Kingdom of Hawaii.

In 1827, she married Gerrit P. Judd, an American missionary who was appointed advisor and minister of finance to King Kamehameha III.

== Biography ==
Laura Fish was born to a family of seven to Elias Fish and Sybil Fish (née Williams) on April 2, 1804, in Plainfield, New York. She grew up in poverty after her mother's premature death. Her father also had an accident that left him disabled. Judd had to stay among relatives' households and village schools until she started teaching at the age of 16. She continued to work in this capacity to raise money to fund her education at Clinton Female Seminary in Oneida County, New York.

Judd became a Protestant missionary when she was nineteen and was involved in missionary work in Mexico, New York. Later, she enlisted in a foreign mission to the Sandwich Islands (Hawaii) in the North Pacific Ocean.

Judd married Gerrit P. Judd on September 20, 1827. The couple had nine children. She died on October 2, 1872, in Honolulu.

== Career ==
Weeks after their marriage, Judd and her husband and other missionaries sailed on the ship Parthian, departing from Boston on November 3, 1827, and landing on Oahu on March 30, 1828. They were part of the third company of missionaries sent by the American Board of Commissioners for Foreign Missions (ABCFM) to evangelize the Hawaiian Islands. An account stated that she learned the local language quickly and assisted her husband as he practiced medicine, preached as a missionary, and taught young students.

Judd developed a strong relationship with Queen Kaʻahumanu, the widow of King Kamehameha I, who asked Judd to live with her and teach her how to make western dresses. She wrote how "Kaahumanu treated us [the missionary wives] like pet children" and "could dandle any of us in her lap, as she would a little child, which she often takes the liberty of doing". In 1832, she and other missionary wives created the first school for Native Hawaiian children. Previously, only the adult population had been educated.

Judd started writing about Hawaii and her missionary work. When her husband retired as minister, for instance, she published his accomplishments in Honolulu... from 1828 to 1861 (1880). Judd also recorded an account of Queen Kalama and her marriage to King Kamehameha III in 1837. Her work also included observations on Hawaiian culture such as her descriptions of Hawaiian dining etiquette and cuisine.
