= Robert Crichton Wyllie =

Scottish-born Hawaiian politician

The Honourable Robert Crichton Wyllie
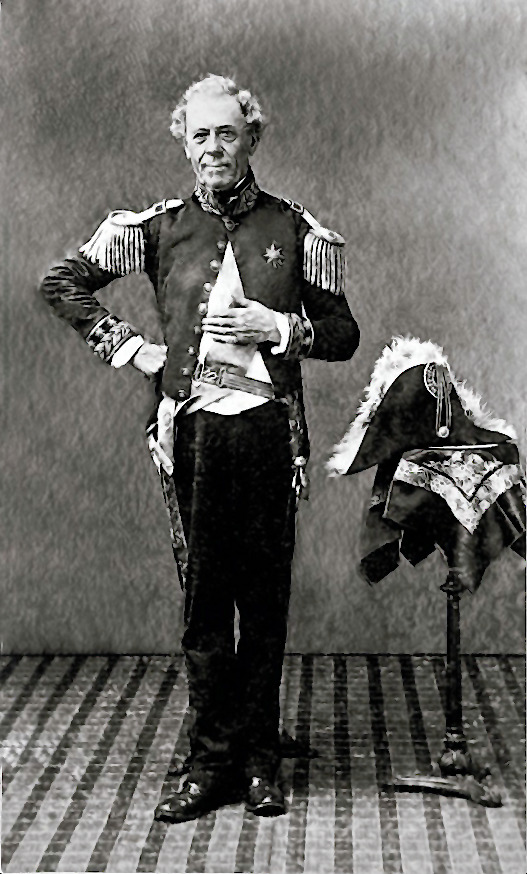

Minister of Foreign Affairs
- In office 26 March 1845 – 19 October 1865
- Monarchs: Kamehameha III; Kamehameha IV; Kamehameha V
- Preceded by: Gerrit P. Judd
- Succeeded by: Charles de Varigny

Personal details
- Born: 13 October 1798 Dunlop, Scotland, Kingdom of Great Britain
- Died: 19 October 1865 (aged 67) Honolulu, Oahu, Kingdom of Hawaii
- Resting place: Mauna ʻAla Royal Mausoleum
- Occupation: Physician, businessman, politician

Robert Crichton Wyllie (13 October 1798 – 19 October 1865) was a Scottish physician and businessman. He served for twenty years as Minister of Foreign Affairs in the Kingdom of Hawaii.

== Early life ==
Wyllie was born 13 October 1798, in an area called Hazelbank in Dunlop parish of East Ayrshire, Scotland. His father was Alexander Wyllie. His mother, Janet Crichton, traced her descent from James Crichton. He attended the University of Glasgow, earning a medical diploma by the time he was 20. He left as a ship surgeon, intending to practice in Russia. He got as far as Valparaíso in Chile in 1818, then set up in practice in nearby Coquimbo. After a few years he gave up medical practice and became a partner in a successful trading business. He took a small yacht, Daule, to Kolkata, India (then called Calcutta), from 1824 to 1826, stopping in the Hawaiian Islands en route. A friend William Edward Petty Hartnell had settled near Monterey, California since 1822, taking the name Don Guillermo and a Spanish wife.

Wyllie returned to England in 1830, and continued to grow his fortune in banking with a partner named Lyall. He joined the expensive Reform Club in London. In 1842 he left for Mexico to investigate some of his investments in a group called the Spanish American Bondholders. Mexico was in financial trouble from the Texas Revolution and had essentially mortgaged vast amounts of land. His friend Hartnell provided detailed reports encouraging British settlement of California. He was involved with Manuel Micheltorena, governor of Alta California, and Wyllie proposed a plan to buy land in Sacramento Valley and colonize California in 1843.

Writing about this episode, a historian says:

...no drama in the Pacific was complete without the fastidious, meticulous and verbose Scots busybody, Dr. Robert Chrichton Wyllie.

He stayed with British Consul to Mexico (and fellow Scot) Alexander Forbes, hoping to get help from his investors for the California scheme. The investors, however, were willing to wait to get their money back. Irish priest Eugene McNamara led what would be the closest attempt to assert British influence in California. By the time McNamara acted, however, events such as the "Bear Flag Revolt" gave the United States effective control over California.

== Hawaii ==
Wyllie ran into his friend William Miller while in Mazatlán. Miller, although born in England, served as a general in the Latin American wars of independence under Simón Bolívar. The two had met earlier in Valparaíso. Miller had just been appointed British Consul to the Kingdom of Hawaii and convinced Wyllie to come with him while he was waiting for a response from his investors. They arrived in Honolulu in January 1844 aboard HMS Hazard. Miller continued on his voyage to Tahiti, since he was assigned to oversee British relations to all Pacific Islands. Wyllie stayed in the Hawaiian islands for the rest of his life.

=== Politics and diplomacy ===
Wyllie first worked as acting British Consul until Miller returned 15 March 1845. During this time he compiled in-depth reports on the conditions in the islands. He was then appointed by King Kamehameha III as Minister of Foreign Affairs, Secretary of War, and to the legislature in the House of Nobles on 26 March 1845.

He was seen as a counter to the American influence of Gerrit P. Judd, who had been a missionary doctor before becoming the first Treasurer, effectively the most powerful position in the country. Judd had also been acting as Minister of Foreign Affairs up to the appointment of Wyllie. Judd served about a year as Minister of Interior, and then was given the title Minister of Finance 15 April 1846. One of his first assignments was to list the various complaints between the previous British Consul Richard Charlton and the American Commissioner George Brown. Brown had been fairly universally disliked, and was removed by request of the Hawaiian government.

In 1847 he started collecting documents to form the Archives of Hawaii.

=== Crises and treaties ===
On 12 August 1849, French admiral Louis Tromelin staged a French Invasion of Honolulu. Tromelin sacked the city before sailing off with the king's yacht and other plunder. Judd and two young princes were sent to Europe to negotiate treaties, stopping in the United States on the way. Judd advocated annexation by the United States to protect against further actions by British and French. Wyllie was more in favor of a simple treaty of Reciprocity. Former Hawaiian newspaper publisher James Jackson Jarves negotiated a treaty with John M. Clayton signed on 20 December 1849.

In the meanwhile, Judd had met Charles Eames, the new American Commissioner and negotiated his own treaty in October 1849. Eames had been appointed by President James Polk for this purpose, but got only as far as San Francisco when he got involved in the California Gold Rush. Eames was quickly replaced with Luther Severance as U.S. Commissioner. By 1850 he had treaties signed by the United States, Britain, France, and Denmark.

Wyllie had suggested dismantling the old Honolulu Fort, since its outdated armaments had proven to be useless in preventing attacks anyway. In 1850 he proposed developing land around the Honolulu Harbor including the old fort land. Distractions would prevent this from happening for several years.

A shipload of former gold prospectors led by Samuel Brannan arrived in 1851. These came to be known as the "filibusters". Brannan's men destroyed some mail on their ship, hoping to start a surprise rebellion, but Wyllie had already heard rumors and had them closely watched. After vacationing for the winter, they left without getting any popular support.

=== Mixing business ===
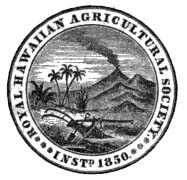
The Royal Hawaiian Agricultural Society was founded by American and British plantation owners

Wyllie built a house in Nuʻuanu Valley he called Rosebank. He entertained foreign visitors at the house, and the area today still has several consular buildings. In March 1853 he bought a plantation on Hanalei Bay on the north shore of the island of Kauaʻi. After an 1860 visit by Queen Emma of Hawaii and her son Prince Albert Kamehameha he named the plantation Princeville. He named another part of the plantation Emmaville, but that name never stuck. Originally the land was planted with Coffee which was not suited to the wet lowlands. It was then planted with sugarcane. He was a founding member of the Royal Hawaiian Agricultural Society in 1850, contributing many papers.

Another former Scottish physician, William Jardine (1784–1843) had become wealthy trading opium out of Hong Kong. Wyllie made Jardine's nephews consuls to make sure the lucrative China trade continued. When his sugar production was limited by a labor shortage, he proposed importing workers from Asia for plantation workers.

=== Annexation delayed ===
Wyllie would outlast many of his rivals and colleagues. Elisha Hunt Allen was American Consul 1850–1853. David L. Gregg became the US commissioner 1853–1858. A smallpox epidemic in 1853 forced Judd to resign from the cabinet 5 September 1853. By the end of 1853, foreign residents were pressuring the king to sign a treaty of annexation with the United States to protect them from more rumored insurrections. Kamehameha IV became king in January 1855, and kept Wyllie in the cabinet. The new king had seen American racism first-hand on his 1849 trip, so ended all negotiations for annexation. James W. Borden became the US commissioner in 1858, and Thomas J. Dryer in 1861. Kamehameha V then came to power when Kamehameha IV died 30 November 1863, and also kept Wyllie in the cabinet.

A letter once appeared in the Ayr Advertiser confusing Wyllie with English physician Thomas Charles Byde Rooke, who was adoptive father of Kamehameha IV's wife Queen Emma. It was titled "The Ayrshire Queen" and called Emma Wyllie's daughter.

=== "Holy war" ===
Wyllie kept Hawaii officially neutral during the American Civil War, but promoted continuing trade of sugar and other products to the expanding Californian market. Meanwhile, he quietly tried to lessen the influence of conservative American missionaries.

In 1859, Wyllie instructed the Hawaiian Consul in London, Manley Hopkins to send a priest from the Anglican church. He also contacted William Ingraham Kip of the American Episcopal Church in California who supported the idea, but the Civil War prevented any help from them. Thomas Nettleship Staley, an Englishman, was consecrated as Bishop and arrived October, 1862, to start the Church of Hawaii. This was a more liberal church with pomp and ceremony missing from the dour American sects. Wyllie would even have dancing at his social events (previously prohibited as sinful), and held the first "fancy dress ball", coming in Scottish Highland Dress. He even invited the Catholic Bishop who came in his full Pontifical vestments.

Wyllie encouraged Emma to write to Queen Victoria, and despite the contrast in their respective dominions, they became lifelong friends. They exchanged condolences when their sons and then husbands died. Victoria sent an elaborate silver cup and offered to be godmother (by proxy) of the young prince.

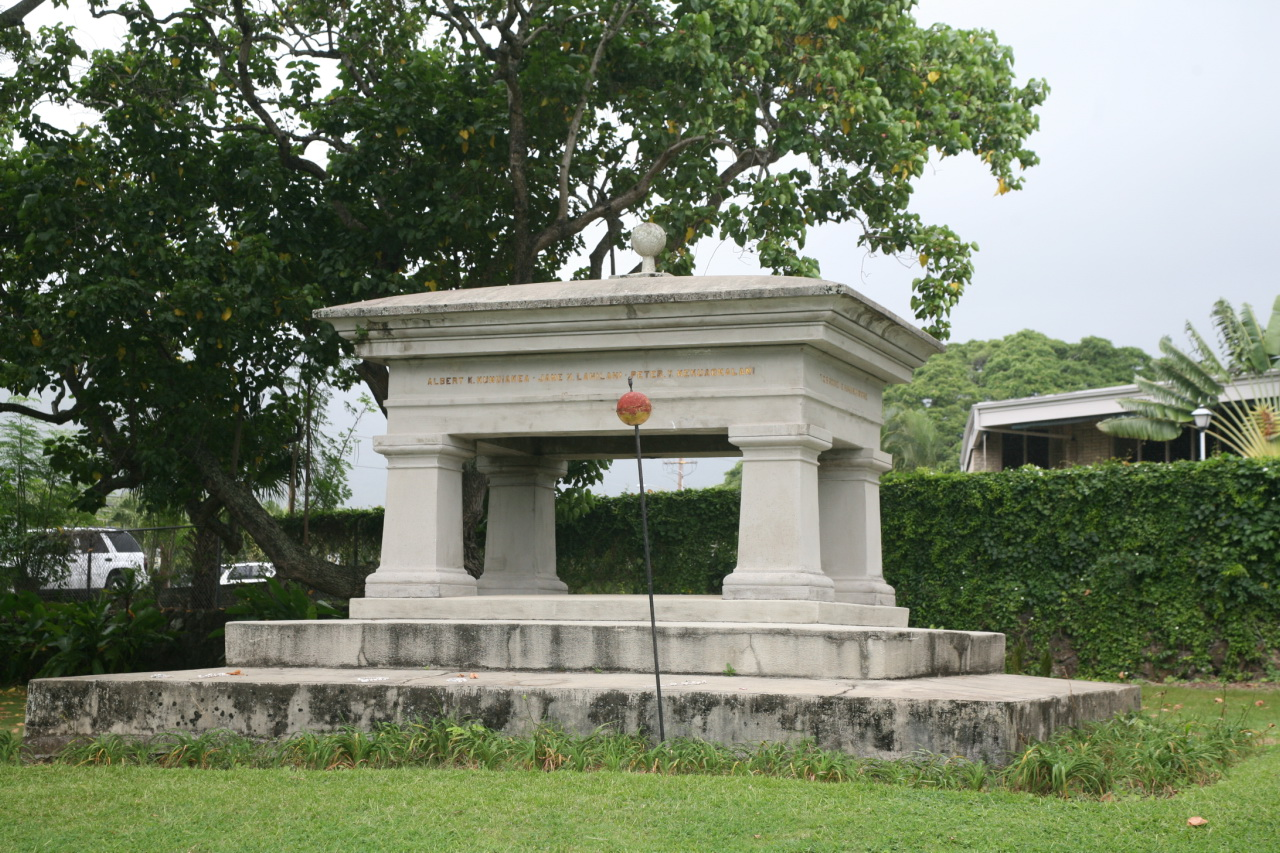
Wyllie tomb at the Royal Mausoleum of Hawaii.

In 1862 Lady Jane Franklin was entertained by Wyllie at his estates. He proposed awarding out peerage titles, with Lady Franklin as one of the first to be awarded by giving her the title of Baroness. The democratically minded Americans would not allow it, but he did introduce court etiquette rules and official titles for the royalty. He insisted on formal European-style military uniforms for both royalty and cabinet officers, and favored decorative medals such as the Royal Order of Kamehameha I.

== Legacy ==
Wyllie died on 19 October 1865. Charles de Varigny who was serving as Minister of Finance, was his successor as Foreign Minister. He was the third person buried in the Royal Mausoleum of Hawaii, which had just been completed. His nephew Robert Crichton Cockrane was named his heir, and changed his last name to Wyllie. Robert found out that the new sugar factory built on his Princeville plantation was deep in debt, and committed suicide in 1866. It was then bought by Elisha Hunt Allen at auction for a fraction of what Wyllie had spent on it. A tomb built in 1904 was named for him, and his remains were moved there, along with members of the family of Queen Emma.

Rosebank was bought at auction by Charles Judd, son of Gerrit. Walter M. Gibson wrote that the personal papers were thrown out of the house, but most have never been found. He then sold Rosebank to Frederick August Schaefer. However, his meticulous records of public government business became the basis of the Hawaii State Archives.

A street is named Wyllie Road in the Princeville resort at 22°13′8″N 159°28′16″W. As Nuʻuanu Valley was developed, a Wyllie Street was named for him, opposite the site of his Rosebank estate at 21°19′38″N 157°50′45″W.

== Works ==
- Robert Crichton Wyllie (1844). Mexico: Report on its finances under the Spanish government; since its independence and prospects of their improvement. A. H. Baily, London.
- Robert Crichton Wyllie (1846). Table of consular grievances, 1843–1846. A. H. Baily, London.
- Robert Crichton Wyllie (1848). Answers to questions proposed by His Excellency, R. C. Wyllie, His Majesty's Minister of Foreign Relations, and addressed to all the Missionaries in the Hawaiian Islands, May 1846. Hawaii Department of Foreign Affairs.
- Robert Crichton Wyllie (1851). Address to the House of representatives of the Hawaiian kingdom: on the inefficiency of high duties on spirits, in promoting temperance, morality and revenue, and the expediency of lowering the duties, in conformity with the strong recommentations of the chamber of commerce of Honolulu. Hawaii Department of Foreign Affairs.
- Robert Crichton Wyllie (1854). Motion in the Hawaiian Parliament to release John Ricord, Esquire, His Majesty's attorney general, from a debt standing against him in the books of the King's Treasury, since June, 1847. Hawaii Department of Foreign Affairs.

Government offices
Preceded by Gerrit P. Judd	Kingdom of Hawaii Minister of Foreign Affairs; 1845–1865	Succeeded by Charles de Varigny
