= Charles de Varigny =

French adventurer, diplomat, translator and writer

The Honourable Charles de Varigny
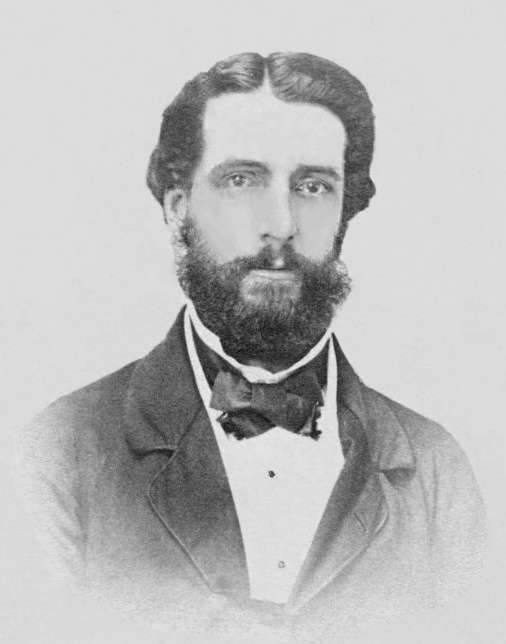

French Consul to Kingdom of Hawaii
- In office 1862–1863
- Monarch: Napoleon III
- Preceded by: Louis Emile Perrin
- Succeeded by: Germain Marie Maxime Desnoyers

Minister of Finance
- In office December 24, 1863 – December 21, 1865
- Monarch: Kamehameha V
- Preceded by: Charles Gordon Hopkins
- Succeeded by: Charles Coffin Harris

Minister of Foreign Affairs
- In office December 21, 1865 – November 1869
- Preceded by: Robert Crichton Wyllie
- Succeeded by: Charles Coffin Harris

Personal details
- Born: November 25, 1829 Versailles, France
- Died: November 9, 1899 (aged 69) Montmorency, Val-d'Oise
- Spouse: Louise Constantin
- Children: 3
- Occupation: Author, Diplomat, Politician

Charles Victor Crosnier de Varigny (November 25, 1829 – November 9, 1899) was a French adventurer, diplomat, translator and writer.

He was born November 25, 1829, in Versailles. He was educated at Lycée Bourbon. He came with his father to the California Gold Rush. He married Louise Constantin (1827–1894) August 14, 1852, in San Francisco, and worked for a French language newspaper, L'echo du Pacifique founded by Étienne Derbec.

He and his family arrived on the Restless from San Francisco February 18, 1855, in Honolulu. He accepted a position as translator to Louis Emile Perrin the Consul (diplomatic rank below that of ambassador) from France to the Kingdom of Hawaii. he became friends with Scot Robert Crichton Wyllie who spoke several languages due to his travel throughout South America and the Pacific. At that time France and Great Britain were allies in the Crimean War. In 1857 he traveled to the island of Hawaiʻi with German Hermann von Holt. They toured Kīlauea volcano, and visited the rancher John Palmer Parker. They hired the guide "Jack" Purdy who told the story of earlier adventurer Julius Brenchley. Purdy then led them in an ascent of Mauna Kea, the highest mountain in the Pacific.

When Perrin died in 1862 he became acting Consul from France. In July 1863 he visited the island of Kauaʻi, including a visit of the Princeville sugarcane plantation owned by Wyllie.

On December 7, 1863, he was appointed to the Privy Council for King Kamehameha V and on 14 to become the Minister of Finance. Immediately the new king caused a political crisis by refusing to take an oath to the constitution. After a constitutional convention did not agree with his proposal, Kamehameha V proclaimed his own 1864 Constitution of the Kingdom of Hawaii. Varigny generally supported the new constitution, which gave both the king and cabinet ministers more power, and limited voters with property requirements.

From 1864 through 1868 he served in the House of Nobles of the legislature. On January 21, 1865, he was appointed to the Bureau of Immigration and Bureau of Public Instruction.

After the death of Wyllie Varigny became Minister of Foreign Affairs on December 21, 1865. One of his first acts was to call off the efforts of John Bowring for negotiating a three-way treaty between France, Great Britain, and the United States. Varigny instead favored an individual reciprocity treaty with each country. Charles Coffin Harris had negotiated a tentative treaty with American Commissioner Edward Moody McCook. However, in the meantime the USS Lackawanna under Captain William Reynolds had arrived February 9, 1867, and refused to leave in response to rumors that France was going to take over the islands. Harris lodged a protest to Secretary of State William Henry Seward. Seward had just completed the Alaska Purchase. Rumors circulated that the U.S. was ready to invade, and some Americans on the islands indicated they would support such a move. On August 28, 1867, Reynolds claimed possession of Midway Atoll. The Captain's clerk leaked letters to the Hawaiian government alleging a conspiracy for starting a rebellion. Varigny forwarded the letters to the U.S. State Department, who then requested to have the clerk arrested.

In March 1868 an increase in volcanic activity resulted in the 1868 Hawaii earthquake and resulting tsunami that caused damage throughout the islands. Varigny helped organize bringing aid to the victims. On May 6, 1868, the Lackawanna sailed back to San Francisco and the clerk was court-martialed. He was found guilty, but quietly had his sentence suspended, probably to avoid any embarrassing publicity.

Later in 1868 he returned to France. He tried to negotiate treaties between Hawaii and European powers, but the conflicts leading up to the Franco-Prussian War prevented much progress. A short treaty with Russia was signed June 19, 1869. He also negotiated treaties with the North German Confederation and Denmark, but these were rejected by the Hawaiian government because they did not allow for any other reciprocity agreements. His leave of absence expired in November 1869. He asked to continue as envoy, but by the fall of 1870 as relieved of any connection with Hawaii. Harris took over the ministry of foreign affairs, while John Mott-Smith replaced Harris as minister of finance. He published a series of articles about his voyages starting in 1873. He then expanded these stories into a book about his 14 years in the islands, followed by others about his experiences in California and other parts of the Pacific.

He died November 9, 1899, in Montmorency, Val-d'Oise near Paris. His son Henry Crosnier de Varigny was born 1855 and became a biologist. Henry's writings included a biography of Charles Darwin and other works discussing evolution. Henry died in 1934. He also had two daughters.

== Works ==
- Charles Victor Crosnier de Varigny (1871). Quatorze Ans aux Iles Sandwich. Paris: Librairie Hachette et Cie. (French)
- Charles Victor Crosnier de Varigny (1878). Ella Wilson; Parley Pratt; Kiana. Paris: E. Plon et Cie. (French)
- Charles Victor Crosnier de Varigny (1885). Louis Riel et l'insurrection canadienne. Paris. (French)
- Charles Victor Crosnier de Varigny (1885). Emma, reine des îles Havai. Paris: Au Bureau. (French)
- Charles Victor Crosnier de Varigny (1888). L'Océan Pacifique: Les derniers cannibales; îles et terres océaniennes; la race polynésienne; San Francisco. Paris: Librairie Hachette et Cie. (French)
- Charles Victor Crosnier de Varigny (1889). Les grandes fortunes aux États-Unis et en Angleterre. Paris: Librairie Hachette et Cie. (French)
- Charles Victor Crosnier de Varigny (1893). La femme aux États-Unis. A. Colin et cie. (French)

Government offices
Preceded by Louis Emile Perrin	Consul from France to Kingdom of Hawaii; 1862–1863	Succeeded by Germain Marie Maxime Desnoyers
Preceded by Charles Gordon Hopkins	Kingdom of Hawaii Minister of Finance; 1863–1865	Succeeded by Charles Coffin Harris
Preceded by Robert Crichton Wyllie	Kingdom of Hawaii Minister of Foreign Affairs; 1865–1869	Succeeded by Charles Coffin Harris
