= Frederick Simpich =

American writer (1878–1950)

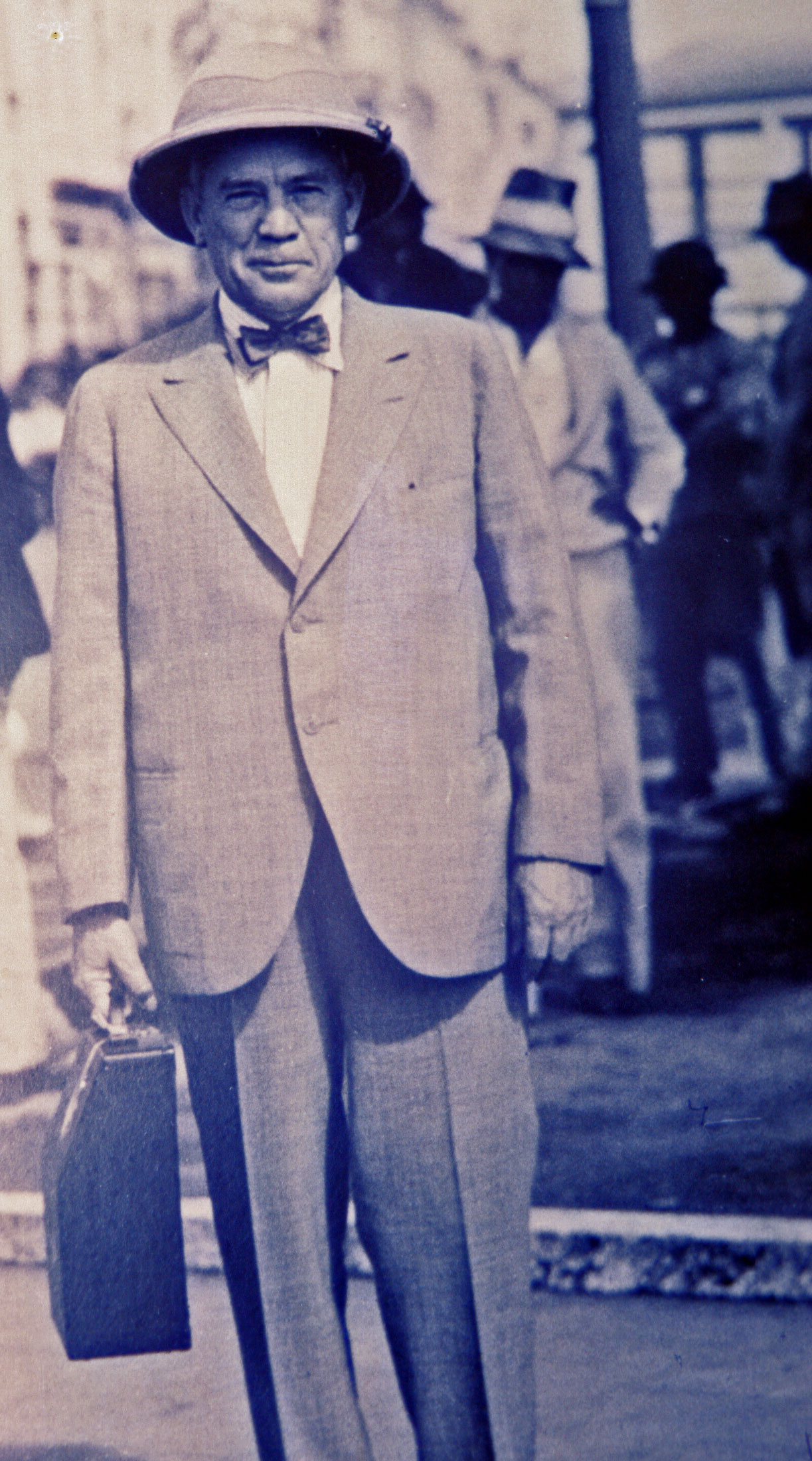
- Born: November 21, 1878 Urbana, Illinois, United States
- Died: 25 January 1950 (aged 71) Pomeroy, Washington
- Occupation: Assistant editor for the National Geographic Society
- Subject: United States geography and articles from around the world
- Spouse: Margaret Ellliot Edwards Simpich

Frederick Simpich (November 21, 1878 – 25 January 1950) was an American writer known for his work in diplomacy, newspaper work, literary work, and as Assistant Editor of the National Geographic Society from 1931 to 1949. During his time in the society, he wrote more articles for the magazine than anyone else before or after his time, over eighty articles from 1914 to 1949. He was known for traveling around the world whilst writing articles for papers and magazines, concluding with his 35-year stay in the Society, during which he wrote an award-winning article about Oklahoma, in 1941.

== Life and career ==
Frederick Simpich was born on November 21, 1878, in Urbana, Illinois, to Charles Frederick and Sarah Elizabeth Simpich. As a youngster, from 1878 to 1896, Simpich started his long career as a newspaper editor in large cities including Shanghai, Manila, and San Francisco, but later switched to magazines, including Saturday Evening Post, Nation's Business, and Argosy. In 1909 he temporarily forsook journalism to take a post with the United States Foreign Service. Literary work however, continued his principal avocation, and his first article, a piece on the Garden of Eden written from Baghdad, in the magazine was contributed in 1914, beginning a 35-year service with the Society. As a diplomat, he went to countries such as Germany, Turkey and Mexico, where he served as the U.S. Consul general, performing services to British, German and Chinese nationalists, during the Mexican Revolution of 1910. For his excellent services, he received official thanks from the governments.

His years in the Foreign Service, from 1909 to 1923, were interrupted briefly in 1918, when he served with the U.S. Army Intelligence. Returning diplomacy, he became consul general in Guatemala in 1920, where he became a trade adviser and a member of the country's Division of Western European Affairs. Returning to literature, he contributed majorly to many American magazines during an April 1923 visit to Latin America. His full service with the National Geographic Society began in 1927, when he was hired by Dr. Gilbert Hovey Grosvenor to join the magazine's staff, and this is where he remained for the rest of his life. He went to various locations around the world, including Europe, South America, the Middle East, and Asia. He gathered all material needed for his articles, and all the photography was done by him.

In 1930, Simpich took part in a 12,000 mile aerial survey by seaplane from Washington, D.C. to Santiago, Chile, with stops in Cuba, Haiti, Dominican Republic, Puerto Rico, Trinidad, Venezuela, Guyana, Suriname, French Guiana, Brazil, Uruguay, Argentina, and Chile.

Upon becoming Assistant Editor in 1931, he focused mainly on publishing "biographies" of as many of the 48 States as he could, writing down information about their natural resources, people, cities, and landmarks. Almost all articles about US States from 1931 to 1949 were written by him. By the late 1940s, though, his health was failing. He formally resigned as Assistant Editor on October 31, 1949, and was replaced by his son, Frederick Simpich Jr. He also allowed Leo A. Borah to take over as "biographer" of the 48 states. Nevertheless, he continued to write articles for the magazine right until his death. His final article, So Much Happens along the Ohio River was published days before his death.

On January 24, 1950, Simpich was preparing for a flight to Texas to work on an article about the state when he was diagnosed with a sudden and deadly yet unknown disease. He was rushed to the Garfield Hospital in Pomeroy, Washington, where he died the next day on January 25, 1950, at the age of seventy-one. A funeral was held on January 28.

== Legacy ==
Simpich was a prolific writer about U.S. states for the Society. As of 2015, he had written the most articles in the history of the Society. He was well known by his colleagues.
