= Albert Francis Judd =

American judge

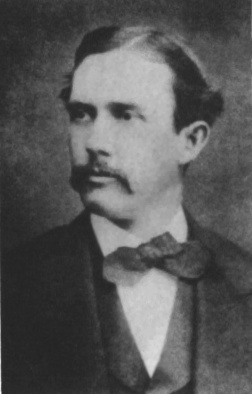

Attorney General of The Kingdom of Hawai'i
- In office January 13, 1873 – February 17, 1874
- Monarchs: Lunalilo; Kalākaua
- Preceded by: Stephen Henry Phillips
- Succeeded by: Alfred S. Hartwell

Chief Justice of the Hawaiʻi Supreme Court
- In office November 5, 1881 – May 20, 1900
- Monarchs: Kalākaua; Liliuokalani
- President: Sanford B. Dole
- Governor: Sanford B. Dole
- Preceded by: Charles Coffin Harris
- Succeeded by: Walter F. Frear

Personal details
- Born: January 7, 1838 Honolulu, Oahu, Kingdom of Hawaii
- Died: May 20, 1900 (aged 62) Honolulu, Territory of Hawaii, United States
- Spouse: Agnes Hall Boyd
- Relations: Bernice Judd (granddaughter)
- Children: 9, including Albert Francis Jr. and Lawrence McCully
- Occupation: Politician

Albert Francis Judd (January 7, 1838 – May 20, 1900) was a judge of the Kingdom of Hawaii who served as Chief Justice of the Supreme Court of Hawaii through its transition into part of the United States.

== Life ==
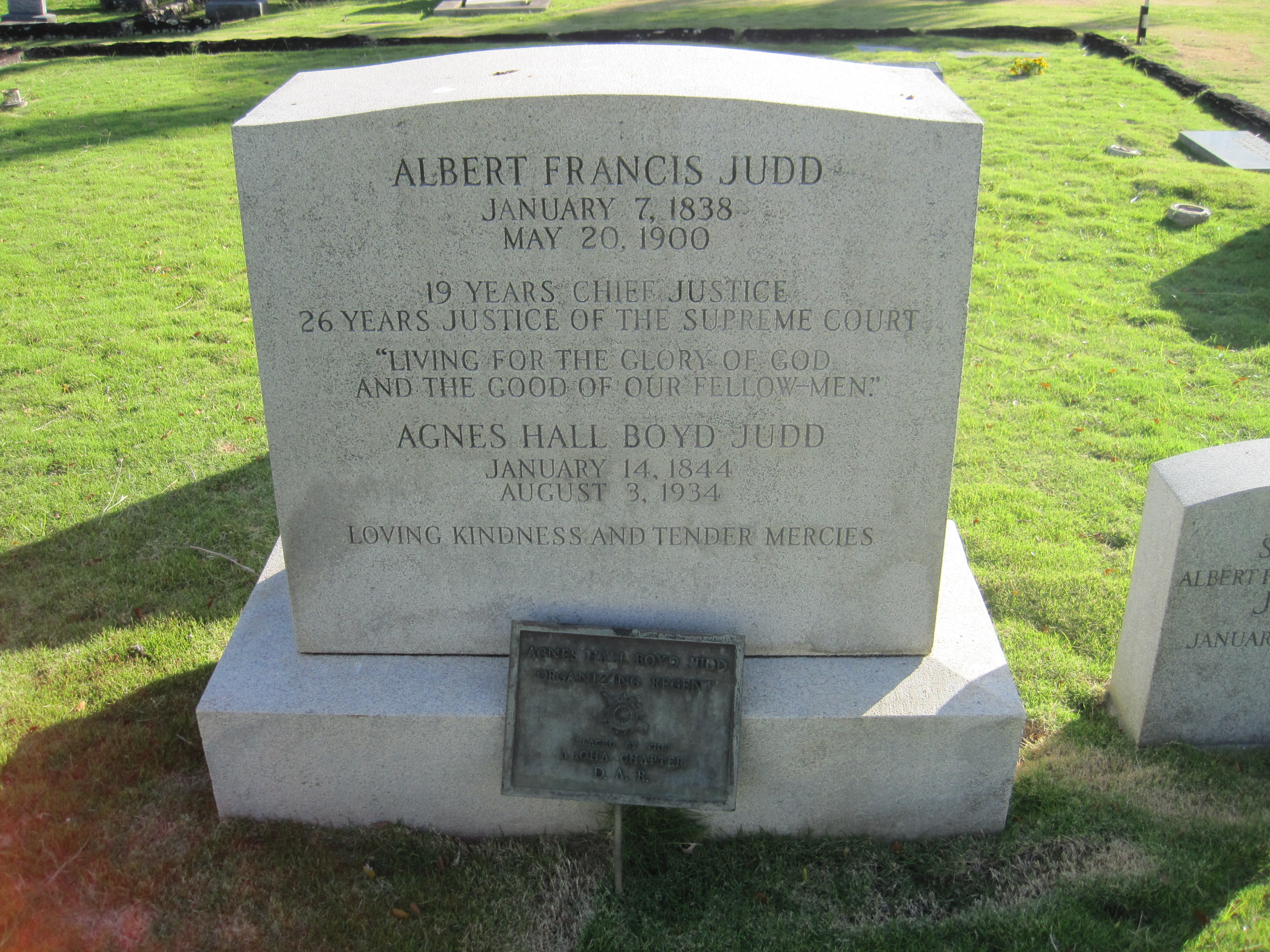
Tombstone of Albert Francis Judd in Oahu Cemetery

Judd was born January 7, 1838, at what was known as the "Old Mission Home" in Honolulu. His father was the physician and statesman Gerrit P. Judd (1803–1873) and mother was Laura Fish Judd (1804–1872).

On his father's side, he was a descendant of Thomas Hastings who came from the East Anglia region of England to the Massachusetts Bay Colony in 1634. Judd attended Punahou School (founded by his father), and two years of study under William DeWitt Alexander 1858–1860. After graduating from Yale in 1862, he received a law degree from Harvard Law School in 1864.

== Career ==
He served in the army of the Kingdom from 1866 to 1871 rising to the rank of captain. From 1868 through 1873 he served in the House of Representatives and from 1868 in the House of Nobles of the Legislature of the Hawaiian Kingdom. In 1873 he helped elect King Lunalilo, and served as attorney general from January 13, 1873, until February 17, 1874. He then helped elect King Kalākaua after Lunalilo's short reign.

He was appointed as Associate Justice of the Supreme Court in 1874, and promoted to Chief Justice November 5, 1881. He served as chief justice for 19 years until his death. Walter F. Frear then became chief justice. In 1881 he served on a commission to revise laws of the Kingdom. He was a stabilizing influence throughout the turbulent overthrow of the Kingdom of Hawaii in 1893, Provisional Government of Hawaii, Republic of Hawaii, and finally formation of the Territory of Hawaii in 1898.

== Marriage and children ==
On April 4, 1872, in Geneva, New York, he married Agnes Hall Boyd (1844–1934) and they had nine children:

1. Agnes Elizabeth Judd, (November 18, 1873 – November 23, 1953)
2. Albert Francis Judd Jr. (December 20, 1874 – December 18, 1939) married Madeline Perry Hartwell, daughter of judge Alfred S. Hartwell in 1899 and had four children.
3. James Robert Judd (May 20, 1876 – June 2, 1947) married Alice Louise Marshall in 1908.
4. Allan Wilkes Judd (February 27, 1879 – ?) married Elizabeth Anna McCarthy in 1907.
5. Henry Pratt Judd (March 15, 1880 – October 13, 1955) married Martha Stevens Case in 1909.
6. Charles Sheldon Judd (July 11, 1881 – June 29, 1939) married Louise Luqiens in 1910.
7. Sophie Boyd Judd (May 17, 1883 – January 28, 1966) married George Paul Cooke (1881–1960), was mother of Francis Judd Cooke. Their great-grandson was Steve Cooke. George Paul was son of businessman Charles Montague Cooke, grandson of Amos Starr Cooke.
8. Gerrit Parmele Judd, III., (February 15, 1885 – February 17, 1963) married Marguerite Foulke in 1910.
9. Lawrence McCully Judd (March 20, 1887 – October 4, 1968) and became Governor of the Territory of Hawaii in 1929–1934.

== Death ==
He died May 20, 1900, in Honolulu after an illness of several months.

Government offices
Preceded by Stephen Henry Phillips	Kingdom of Hawaii Attorney General; January 1873 – February 1874	Succeeded by Alfred S. Hartwell
Legal offices
Preceded by Charles Coffin Harris	Chief Justice of the Hawaiʻi Supreme Court; 1881–1900	Succeeded by Walter F. Frear
