= Gerrit P. Judd =

American physician and missionary

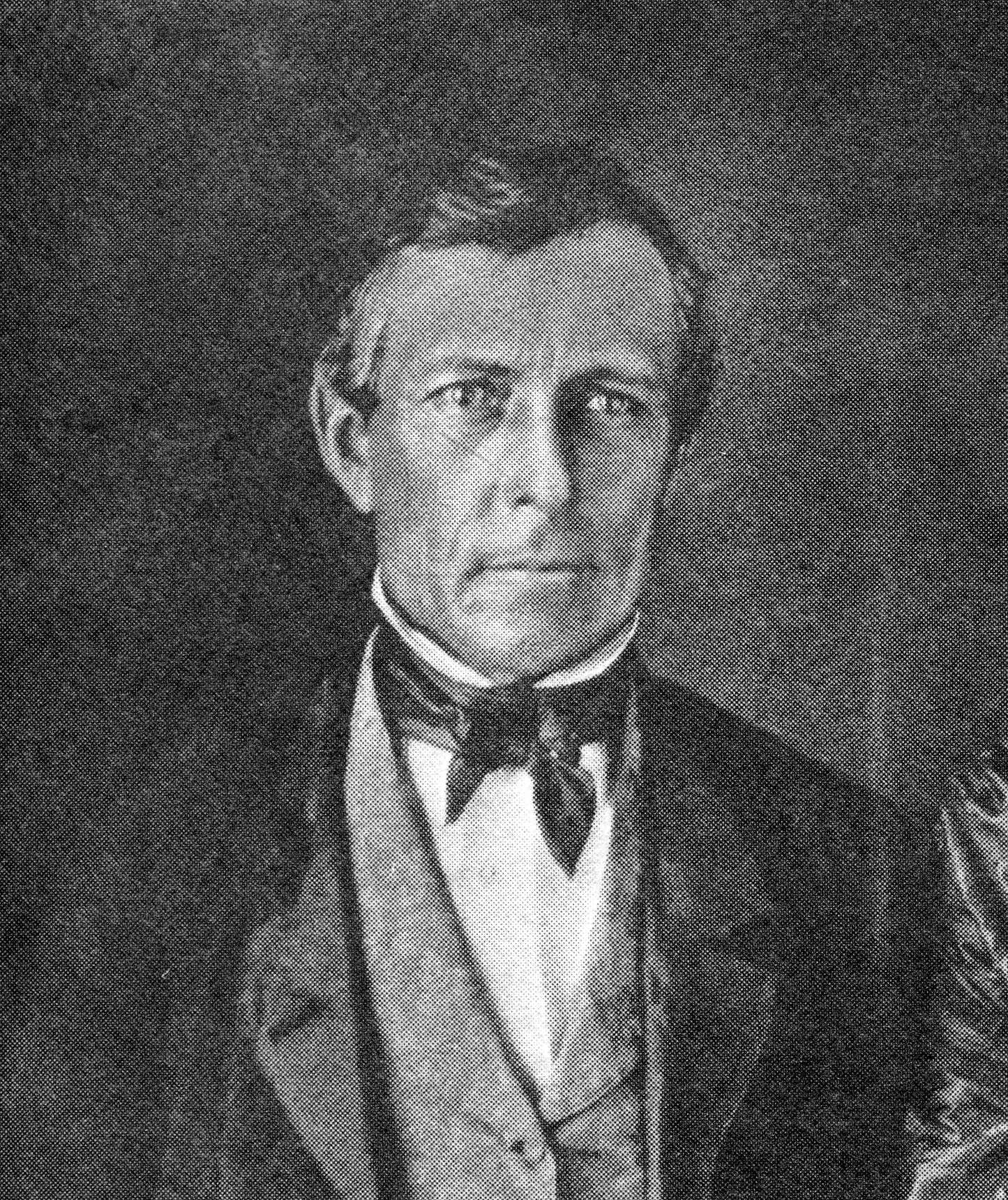
- Born: Gerrit Parmele Judd; April 23, 1803; Paris, New York, U.S.
- Died: July 12, 1873 (aged 70); Honolulu, Kingdom of Hawaii
- Resting place: Oahu Cemetery
- Occupations: Missionary, Physician, Politician
- Spouse: Laura Fish Judd (married 1827)
- Children: Gerrit Parmele II; Elizabeth Kinaʻu; Helen Seymour; Charles Hastings; Laura Fish; Albert Francis; Allan Wilkes; Sybil Augusta; Juliet Isabelle
- Parent(s): Elnathan Judd; Betsey Hastings

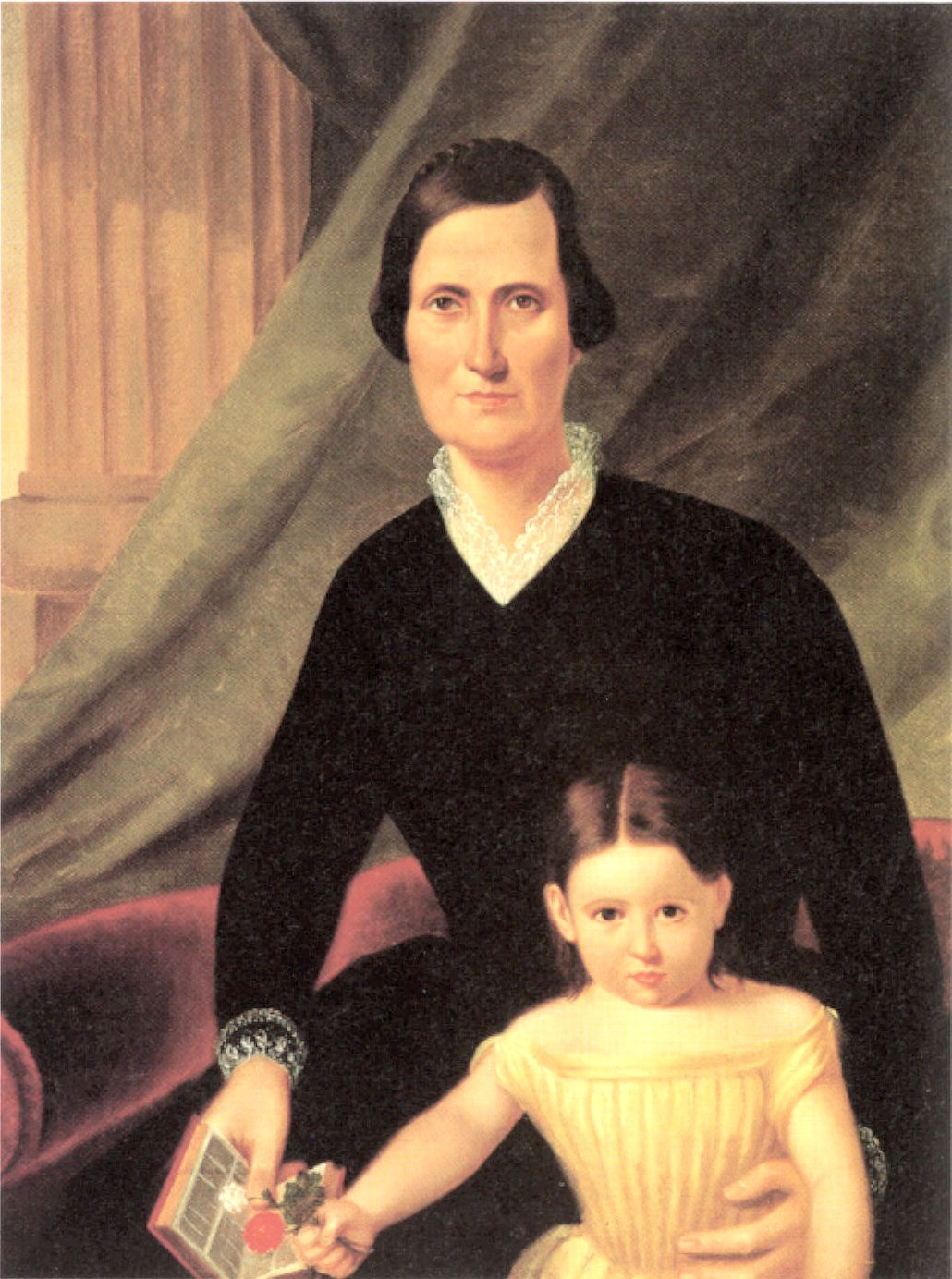
Judd's wife, historian Laura Fish Judd, with their daughter Juliet Isabel, 1850 oil painting by James Gay Sawkins, Mission Houses Museum (Honolulu)

Gerrit Parmele Judd (April 23, 1803 – July 12, 1873) was an American medical doctor and missionary to the Kingdom of Hawaii who later renounced his American citizenship and became a trusted advisor and cabinet minister to King Kamehameha III.

Judd married missionary and historian Laura Fish Judd in 1827, with whom he had nine children.

== Life ==
Judd was born April 23, 1803, in Paris, Oneida County, New York, the son of Elnathan Judd and his wife Betsey Hastings. On his mother's side, he was descended from Thomas Hastings, who came from the East Anglian area of England to the Massachusetts Bay Colony in 1634. He received his middle name in honor of his maternal grandmother, Eunice Parmele.

He was educated as a physician at the medical college in Fairfield, New York. He married Laura Fish (1804–1872) on September 20, 1827, in Clinton, Oneida County, New York. The couple sailed to Hawaii (then known as the 'Sandwich Islands') that same year, on the ship Parthian, the third company from the American Board of Commissioners for Foreign Missions. He was assigned to the mission at Honolulu on the island of Oahu, as a missionary physician, and continued in that employment fifteen years.

== Work ==
In 1842 he resigned from the mission and became an advisor and translator to King Kamehameha III. He also became involved in the civil concerns of the islands, and was the King’s Minister of Foreign Affairs from November 1843 to March 1845, Minister of Interior from March 1845 to February 1846, Minister of Finance from April 1846 to September 1853, and in the House of Representatives from 1858 to 1859. He was commissioned in 1849 as Minister Plenipotentiary to England, France and the United States.

He was one of the founders of the Punahou School for children of the missionaries in 1841. He founded Hawaii's first medical school in 1870, and was the author of one of the first medical texts written in Hawaiian, Anatomia : he palapala ia e hoike ai i ke ano o ko ke kanaka kino, in 1838.

In 1850 Judd purchased from King Kamehameha the land which became the Kualoa Ranch on the Windward Coast of Oahu. His descendants still own and operate the ranch today.

Judd died July 12, 1873, in Honolulu and was buried in the Oahu Cemetery.

== Family ==
Judd and his wife Laura had nine children:

Image	Name	Born	Died	Notes
	Gerrit Parmele II	March 8, 1829	November 13, 1839	Buried in Oahu Cemetery
	Elizabeth Kinaʻu	July 5, 1831	August 21, 1918	Married September 29, 1857, to Samuel Gardner Wilder (1831–1888) from Leominster, Massachusetts, six children.
	Helen Seymour	August 27, 1833	April 2, 1911	
	Charles Hastings	September 8, 1835 (twin)	April 18, 1890	Married November 1, 1859, to Emily Catherine Cutts (1840–1921), four children. Worked in the Guano and farming businesses, and held several posts in the Kingdom.
	Laura Fish	September 8, 1835 (twin)	November 22, 1888 in San Francisco, California	Married February 22, 1861, to Joshua Gill Dickson (1830–1880), four children.
	Albert Francis	January 7, 1838	May 20, 1900	Married April 4, 1872, to Agnes Hall Boyd (1844–1934) nine children. Last child Lawrence M. Judd became Governor of the Territory of Hawaii in 1929–1934.
	Allan Wilkes	April 20, 1841	March 26, 1875	
	Sybil Augusta	March 16, 1843	September 1, 1904	Married February 27, 1862, to Henry Alpheus Peirce Carter (1837–1891), seven children. Son Charles Lunt was a member of the Committee of Safety, and son George Robert was Governor of the Territory of Hawaii (1903–1907).
	Juliet "Julie" Isabelle	March 28, 1846	June 27, 1857	

== Legacy ==
Judd's life was the basis of the novel The White King. A biography, Dr. Judd, Hawaii’s Friend was written by his great-grandson Gerrit P. Judd IV (1915–1971) and published in 1960. His papers were kept under restricted access at the Bishop Museum until his great-grandson Albert Francis Judd III died in 2006.

Judd Street in Honolulu is named in his honour, as is Judd Trail off Old Pali Road in Nu'uanu.

== Publications ==
- Gerrit P. Judd (1838). Anatomia. Lahainaluna.

Government offices
Preceded by Office Created	Kingdom of Hawaii Minister of Foreign Affairs; 1843–1845	Succeeded by Robert Crichton Wyllie
Preceded by Office Created	Kingdom of Hawaii Minister of the Interior; 1845–1846	Succeeded by Keoni Ana
Preceded by Office Created	Kingdom of Hawaii Minister of Finance; 1846–1853	Succeeded by Elisha Hunt Allen
