= List of Wellesley College people =

== Notable alumnae ==
=== Academia ===
- Virginia Abernethy, 1955 – academic anthropologist, involved in politics
- Frances Dorothy Acomb – academic and historian
- Grace Andrews, 1890 – mathematician and professor
- Myrtilla Avery, 1891 – classical scholar focused on Medieval art, former chair of Department of Art at Wellesley College and director of the Farnsworth Art Museum 1930–1937; introduced the first art history classes at Wellesley and the earliest museum studies courses
- Carole B. Balin, 1986 – professor of Jewish history
- Patricia Bizzell, 1970 – professor of English
- Jane M. Bowers, 1958 – flautist, musicologist and feminist historian
- Victoria Budson, 1993 – founder of Women and Public Policy Program at the Harvard Kennedy School, one of CNN's "Ten Visionary Women"
- Claudia Lauper Bushman, 1956 – historian
- Margaret Clapp, 1930 – former president of Wellesley College (1949–1960) and winner of the Pulitzer Prize for Biography
- Cecilia Conrad, 1976 – economics professor, dean of Pomona College
- Miriam DeCosta-Willis, 1956 – Romance language scholar, civil rights activist, and first Black professor at Memphis State University
- Frances Daly Fergusson, 1965 – former president of Vassar College
- Juliet Floyd, 1982 – professor of Philosophy
- Margaret Henderson Floyd, 1953 – art historian and professor
- Susan Foh – biblical scholar
- Phyllis Fox, 1944 – mathematician and computer scientist
- Barbara Fraumeni, 1972 – economist
- Grace Frick, 1925 – linguistics scholar
- Marjorie Grene, 1931 – philosopher, one of the first philosophers to raise questions about the synthetic theory of evolution
- Cheryl Harris, 1973 – Rosalinde and Arthur Gilbert Professor in Civil Rights and Civil Liberties at UCLA Law School
- Mary Hefferan (1873–1948) – taught bacteriology, University of Chicago
- Carolyn Gold Heilbrun, 1947 – professor of English literature at Columbia University, and mystery novelist under the name "Amanda Cross"
- Ayesha Jalal, 1978 – historian, 1998 MacArthur Foundation Fellowship
- Theodora J. Kalikow, 1962 – former president, University of Maine at Farmington and University of Southern Maine
- Amalie Kass, 1949 – historian
- Yoshi Kasuya, 1923 – educator, former president of Tsuda University
- Amy Kelly, educator, historian, best-selling author
- Nannerl O. Keohane, 1961 – political theorist; president, Wellesley College and Duke University
- Jennie Ellis Keysor, 1883 – pioneer in adult education
- Jean Kilbourne, 1964 – author, expert on the image of women in advertising
- Rosalind E. Krauss, 1962 – art critic, professor, theorist
- Helen Hull Law (1890–1966) – professor of Latin and Greek
- Anita Calvert Lebourgeoise – attorney, judge, genealogist, biographer and women's suffrage orator
- Mary Lefkowitz, 1957 – classical scholar
- Helen Lefkowitz Horowitz, 1963 – historian
- Phyllis Williams Lehmann, 1934 – archaeologist
- Helen Abbot Merrill, 1886 – mathematician
- Winifred Edgerton Merrill, 1883 – mathematician, first woman to receive a PhD in mathematics
- Michele Moody-Adams, 1978 – dean, Columbia College
- Ellen Fitz Pendleton, 1886 – mathematician, former president of Wellesley College
- Karen Remmer, 1966 – political scientist
- Eliza Newkirk Rogers, 1900 – art history professor at Wellesley College and Mount Holyoke College; shaped the art history department at Wellesley; donated her art collection to the Davis Museum at Wellesley College; created the Eliza Newkirk Rogers Prize for Architecture at Wellesley
- Carol Sanger, 1970 – reproductive rights expert, professor at Columbia Law School
- Kay Lehman Schlozman, 1968 – political scientist
- Mary Lyndon Shanley, 1966 – legal scholar, professor of political science at Vassar College
- Jennifer S. Thaler, 1993 – professor of Entomology at Cornell University
- Ellen Umansky, 1972 – professor of Judaic studies
- Roxana Vivian, 1894 – mathematics professor at Wellesley College, the first in her department to hold a doctorate, and Hartwick College.
- Diana Chapman Walsh, 1966 – former president, Wellesley College
- Ernestine Wiedenbach, 1922 – nursing theorist
- Patricia J. Williams, 1972 – law professor at Columbia University, recipient of the MacArthur Foundation Fellowship

=== Visual art and design ===
- Julia Alexander, 1989 – art historian and curator
- Molly Bang, 1965 – illustrator
- Ann Beha, 1972 – founder and principal, Ann Beha Architects, committed to historic preservation
- Anita Berrizbeitia, 1980 – landscape architect and chair of the Harvard Graduate School of Design's Department of Landscape Architecture
- Anna Campbell Bliss, 1946 – artist and architect
- Emilie Benes Brzezinski, 1953 – sculptor, wife of Zbigniew Brzezinski
- Carol Cadou – art curator and museum director
- Mildred Codding – medical illustrator
- Leila Daw, 1962 – installation artist
- Patricia Degener (1924–2008) – ceramic artist
- Victorine du Pont Homsey, 1923 – architect and Fellow of the American Institute of Architects
- Anne Fougeron, 1977 – architect, B.A. in architectural history
- Juliette May Fraser, 1909 – painter, muralist, illustrator, and printmaker in Hawaii
- Mary Rockwell Hook, 1900 – architect
- Julia Kunin, 1983 – sculptor, video artist
- Jennifer Maestre, 1981 – sculptor
- Lorraine O'Grady, 1955 – conceptual artist and art critic
- Olivia Parker, 1963 – photographer
- Eleanor Raymond, 1909 – architect, designed and built the first occupied solar-powered house in the US
- Elizabeth Barlow Rogers, 1957 – urban planner, landscape architect

=== Business ===
- Mary Cunningham Agee, 1973 – president, The Nurturing Network
- Robin Chase, 1980 – co-founder of Zipcar
- Elisabeth DeMarse, 1976 – former CEO, chairman, and president of TheStreet.Com
- Heather Higgins, 1981 – nonprofit executive, political commentator
- Lois Juliber, 1971 – vice chairman of Colgate-Palmolive
- Sophie Kim, 2006 – CEO of Kurly
- Elizabeth Parr-Johnston, 1961 – economist
- Priya Paul, 1988 – chairman of Park Hotels, head of Apeejay Surendra Group, trustee of Wellesley College
- Marion Sandler, 1952 – CEO and founder of Golden West Financial
- Anne Toth, 1993 – privacy and policy executive, former Chief Trust Officer of Yahoo
- Vicky Tsai, 2000 – CEO and founder of Tatcha
- Susan Wagner, 1982 – founder and former COO of BlackRock and board member of Apple Inc.
- Joan Wallace-Benjamin, 1975 – CEO of the Home for Little Wanderers

=== Government and public service ===
- Eleanor D. Acheson, 1969 – former assistant attorney general of the United States
- Bertha Adkins, 1928 – former undersecretary of Health, Education, and Welfare
- Madeleine Albright, 1959 – diplomat and political scientist, 64th United States secretary of state (1997–2001), the first woman to hold the position
- Michelle Au, 1999 – state senator, Georgia; first Asian-American woman appointed to Georgia State Senate
- Annette Baker Fox, 1934 – international relations advisor
- Carolina Barco Isakson, 1973 – Colombian foreign minister 2002–2006, ambassador to the US, 2006–2010
- Jocelyn Benson, 1999 – current secretary of state, Michigan; former dean, Wayne State University Law School; youngest dean appointed to an accredited law school
- Jane Bolin, 1928 – first African-American woman to become a judge
- Sophonisba Breckinridge, 1888 – activist
- Anita B. Brody, 1955 – judge of the United States District Court for the Eastern District of Pennsylvania
- Emily Sophie Brown, 1904 – one of the first women to serve in the Connecticut House of Representatives
- Janath R. Cannon, 1939 – counselor to the Relief Society of the Church of Jesus Christ of Latter-day Saints
- Wilma Chan, 1971 – California Democrat
- Harriette L. Chandler, 1959 – president of the Massachusetts Senate
- Gail Chang Bohr, 1966 – former Minnesota judge
- Soong Mei-ling 宋美齡 (Madame Chiang Kai-Shek), 1917 – former First Lady of the Republic of China
- Marguerite S. Church, 1915 – U.S. representative from Illinois
- Esther Clenott, 1945 – politician from Maine, former two-term mayor of Portland and state representative
- Hillary Clinton, 1969 – First Lady of the United States (1993–2001), U.S. senator (D-New York) (2001–2009), 67th United States secretary of state (2009–2013)
- Deborah Cochran, 1960 – congresswoman from Massachusetts
- Jan Coggeshall, 1957 – 49th mayor of Galveston, Texas (1984–1989)
- Elinor G. Constable, 1955 – diplomat, U.S. ambassador to Kenya
- Rita Crocker Clements – former First Lady of the U.S. state of Texas
- Ophelia Dahl, 1994 – executive director of Partners in Health, daughter of children's author Roald Dahl and actress Patricia Neal
- Molly Dewson, 1897 – feminist, political activist
- Diana DiZoglio, 2010 – Massachusetts state representative (D-14th Essex District)
- Christine Durham, 1967 – chief justice, Utah Supreme Court
- Virginia Durr, 1925 – civil rights activist
- Carolyn Dykema, 1989 – former Massachusetts state representative
- Susan Estrich, 1974 – lawyer, professor, author, feminist advocate and commentator for Fox News
- Colette Flesch, 1960 – Luxembourg politician (vice-prime minister and minister of Foreign Affairs) and Olympic fencer
- Loletta Fyan, 1915 – first librarian in Michigan
- Cynthia Glassman, 1967 – commissioner of the SEC
- Susan P. Graber, 1969 – circuit judge, United States Court of Appeals for the Ninth Circuit
- Wendy Lee Gramm, 1966 – economist, former director of ENRON
- Jean Constance Hamilton, 1968 – judge of the United States District Court for the Eastern District of Missouri
- Abigail Harrison, 2019 – founder of nonprofit the Mars Generation
- Aurelia Harwood – philanthropist, former president of Sierra Club
- Ellen Segal Huvelle, 1970 – judge of the United States District Court for the District of Columbia
- Farahnaz Ispahani, 1985 – member of Pakistan's parliament, spokesperson for the president of Pakistan, journalist
- Carol E. Jackson, 1973 – judge of the United States District Court for the Eastern District of Missouri
- Katie Johnson, 2003 – personal secretary to President Barack Obama
- Amalya Lyle Kearse, 1959 – judge of the United States Court of Appeals for the Second Circuit, five time U.S. Champion bridge player
- Leslie E. Kobayashi, 1979 – judge of the United States District Court for the District of Hawaii
- Nancy K. Kopp, 1965 – treasurer of Maryland
- M. Hannah Lauck, 1986 – judge of the United States District Court for the Eastern District of Virginia
- Gail Laughlin, 1894 – first woman from Maine to practice law and founder of the National League for Women's Service
- Henrietta Wells Livermore, 1887 – suffragette
- Sandra L. Lynch, 1968 – chief judge, United States Court of Appeals for the First Circuit
- Yukiko Maki, 1924 – Japanese educator, Fulbright officer, worked in international exchange
- Nora Margaret Manella, 1972 – presiding justice of the California Second District Court of Appeal, Division Four, former judge of the United States District Court for the Central District of California
- Chirlane McCray, 1975 – public affairs activist, First Lady of New York City
- Ida Craven Merriam, 1925 – statistician for the Social Security Administration
- Lindsey Miller-Lerman, 1968 – justice, Nebraska Supreme Court
- Mary V. Mochary, 1963 – attorney and Republican politician, formerly mayor of Montclair, New Jersey
- Helen Barrett Montgomery, 1884 – women's rights activist, church leader, Bible translator
- Alicia Munnell, 1964 – economist
- Laura W. Murphy, 1976 – lobbyist and civil rights activist
- Helen O'Bannon, 1961 – economist
- Anne W. Patterson, 1971 – U.S. ambassador to Egypt, former acting U.S. ambassador to the United Nations, former U.S. ambassador to Pakistan
- Alex Poon, 2014 – transgender rights activist
- Ruth Baker Pratt, 1898 – congresswoman 1929–1933, first woman elected to Congress from New York
- Reena Raggi, 1973 – judge of the United States Court of Appeals for the Second Circuit
- Leticia Ramos-Shahani, 1951 – former Philippine senator, diplomat, human rights activist
- Diane Ravitch, 1960 – historian, former U.S. assistant secretary of Education
- Desiree Rogers, 1981 – public relations executive, White House Social Secretary
- Allyne R. Ross, 1967 – judge of the United States District Court for the Eastern District of New York
- Vanessa Ruiz, 1972 – associate judge, District of Columbia Court of Appeals
- Janna Ryan, 1991 – attorney; wife of Republican Congressman Paul Ryan
- Lindsay N. Sabadosa, 2002 – Massachusetts state representative (D-1st Hampshire District)
- Ruth O. Selig, 1964 – anthropologist, educator, and museum administrator at the Smithsonian Institution
- Carol Rhodes Sibley, 1923 — Berkeley civic activist and school board president
- Michele Sison, 1981 – U.S. ambassador to Haiti
- Sara Soffel, 1908 – judge, Alleghany County Court and Pennsylvania Courts of Common Pleas; first woman to serve as a judge in Pennsylvania
- Zatae Leola Longsdorff Straw, 1883 – physician, New Hampshire state representative
- Tejshree Thapa, 1988 – human rights attorney, developed legal argument for prosecuting rape as a crime against humanity before the ICTY
- Kavindya Thennankoon, 2019 – Sri Lankan youth activist
- Julieta Valls Noyes, 1984 – U.S. ambassador to Croatia
- Doris Pike White – 24th president general of the Daughters of the American Revolution, member of the White House Conference On Highway Safety Committee, member of the Maine Judicial Council
- Cynthia Wu – 吳欣盈, member of Legislative Yuan and vice presidential candidate, Taiwan
- Lilian Wyckoff Johnson – education policy advocate

=== Journalism ===
- Marian Burros, 1954 – New York Times food columnist and cookbook author
- Michelle Caruso-Cabrera, 1991 – reporter for CNBC, winner of an Emmy Award
- Callie Crossley, 1973 – broadcast journalist with Boston NPR affiliate WGBH-TV
- Kimberly Dozier, 1987 – correspondent for Associated Press, winner of the Peabody Award (2008)
- Elizabeth Drew, 1957 – political journalist
- Nikki Finke, 1975 – entertainment/media journalist, Deadline Hollywood
- Page Hopkins, 1988 – journalist, co-anchor on Fox News and anchor on NBC/MSNBC
- Ellen Levine, 1964 – media executive, former executive director of Hearst Magazines
- Geneva Overholser, 1970 – Pulitzer Prize-winning journalist, director of the School of Journalism at the USC Annenberg School for Communication
- Carla Robbins, 1974 – journalist, member of the NY Times Editorial Board
- Cokie Roberts, 1964 – senior news correspondent at National Public Radio, winner of the Emmy Award (1991) and Edward R. Murrow Award (1990), former host at ABC's This Week with Sam Donaldson & Cokie Roberts
- Marion K. Sanders, 1925 – journalist, editor of Harper's Magazine
- Diane Sawyer, 1967 – journalist, host of ABC's Good Morning America, winner of a 2004 George Polk award for excellence in journalism
- Susan Sheehan, 1958 – journalist, winner of the Pulitzer Prize for General Nonfiction (1983)
- Lynn Sherr, 1963 – correspondent for ABC's 20/20, co-winner of the Peabody Award (1994)
- Marilyn Silverstone, 1950 – photo-journalist and Buddhist nun
- Jennifer Vanasco, 1994 – syndicated columnist and theater critic, senior editor, culture desk, NPR
- Linda Wertheimer, 1965 – journalist, National Public Radio, winner of the DuPont-Columbia Award (1978) for excellence in journalism
- Emily Yoffe, 1977 – journalist and regular contributor to Slate

=== Literature ===
- Harriet Stratemeyer Adams, 1914 – author of Nancy Drew series, pen name Carolyn Keene
- Lisa Alther, 1966 – author, novelist
- Katharine Lee Bates, 1880 – author of the words to the anthem "America the Beautiful"
- Carol Bly, 1951 – short story author, essayist
- Aline Carter, 1914 – poet laureate of Texas
- Grace Zia Chu, 1921 – Chinese cookbook author
- Sheila Connolly, 1972 – mystery writer
- Florence Converse, 1893 – author
- Diane Mott Davidson (attended but later transferred to another college) – mystery writer
- Marjory Stoneman Douglas, 1912 – conservationist and writer
- Norma Farber, 1931 – children's book writer and poet
- Rosario Ferré, 1960 – poet
- Alex Finlayson, 1973 – playwright
- Nancy Friday, 1955 – author of My Secret Garden, an exploration of female sexuality
- Abigail Garner, 1997 – author of Families Like Mine
- Jasmine Guillory, 1997 – novelist
- Shirlee Taylor Haizlip, 1959 – nonfiction writer
- Lisa Kleypas, 1986 – romance novelist, former Miss Massachusetts
- Judith Krantz, 1948 – novelist
- Jane Langton, 1944 – mystery writer, author of children's literature
- Kathryn Lilley, 1956 – mystery writer
- Judith Martin, 1959 – newspaper columnist (Miss Manners)
- Jean Merrill, 1945 – author and editor of children's books
- Rana Zoe Mungin, 2011 – writer and teacher
- Maude Gillette Phillips, 1881 – author, educator
- Santha Rama Rau, 1945 – travel writer
- Alyson Richman, 1994 – novelist
- Nayantara Pandit Sahgal, 1947, novelist, niece of Jawaharlal Nehru and cousin of Indira Gandhi
- Helen Hooven Santmyer, 1918 – writer
- Mildred Savage, 1941 – novelist
- Gertrude Woodcock Seibert, 1885 – writer
- Cathy Song, 1977 – poet
- Ira Trivedi, 2006 – novelist
- Reetika Vazirani, 1984 – poet
- Edith Wherry, 1900 – writer
- Bing Xin, 1926 – Chinese poet, essayist, short-story writer
- Ann Zwinger, 1946 – natural history writer

=== Performing arts, media, and entertainment ===
- Laura Allen, 1996 – actress, All My Children, Mona Lisa Smile
- Fazeelat Aslam, 2005 – Academy Award-winning filmmaker
- Barbara Babcock, 1960 – actress
- Blanche Baker, 1978 – Emmy-winning actress and sculptor – aka Blanche Garfein, aka Blanche Van Dusen
- Kay B. Barrett, 1924 – influential Hollywood talent scout and agent, brought Gone with the Wind to the screen
- Lizzie Borden – filmmaker
- Debra Chasnoff, 1978 – filmmaker
- Amy Chu, 1990 – comic book author
- Phyllis Curtin, 1943 – opera singer
- Katherine K. Davis, 1914 – composer, pianist, and author of the famous Christmas tune "The Little Drummer Boy"* Suzanne Davis, 1976 – jazz pianist
- Jo Duffy, 1976 – editor and writer of comic books
- Nora Ephron, 1962 – movie screenplay writer (When Harry Met Sally...), writer and director (Sleepless in Seattle and You've Got Mail)
- Nancy Friday, 1955 – author
- Daisy Gardner, 1997 – television writer
- Angelina Weld Grimké, 1900 – playwright
- Barbara Lea, 1951 – actress and singer
- Wendy Liebman, 1983 – stand-up comedian
- Amy Linker, 1989 – former actress known for Square Pegs
- Ali MacGraw, 1960 – actress
- Onyeka Onwenu, 1984 – Nigerian singer-songwriter, actress, human rights and social activist, journalist, politician
- Anne Revere, 1926 – film, stage, television actress, whose career was cut short by the 1950s Communist blacklist
- Caroline Rose, 2011 – musician
- Mira Sethi, 2010 – Pakistani author, journalist, and actress
- Elisabeth Shue (transferred to Harvard) – actress
- Natalie Sleeth, 1952 – composer
- Alice Stewart Trillin, 1960 – author, educator, film producer
- Michelle Yip, 1998 – Chinese actress, left before graduation to pursue an acting career in Hong Kong after winning Miss Chinese International Pageant
- Patricia Zipprodt, 1946 – Tony Award-winning costume designer

=== Science and medicine ===
- Nancy Adler, 1968 – professor of Psychology, director of the Center for Health and Community, U.C. San Francisco; member of National Academy of Medicine and American Academy of Arts and Sciences
- Tundi Spring Agardy, 1980 – marine conservationist
- Leah B. Allen, M.A. 1912 – astronomer
- Thelma Alper, 1929 – clinical psychologist, first Jewish woman to receive a PhD from Harvard University
- JudyAnn Bigby, 1973 – internist, secretary of Health and Human Services (Massachusetts)
- Annie Jump Cannon, 1884 – studied physics and astronomy at Wellesley, astronomer, developed the well-known Harvard Classification of stars based upon temperature
- Lisa A. Carey – distinguished professor in breast cancer research
- Martha Stahr Carpenter, 1941 – astronomer, three-term president of AAVSO, and first woman faculty member in the Cornell University College of Arts and Sciences
- Sally Carrighar – naturalist and writer
- Florence Meier Chase, 1924 – botanist at the Smithsonian Astrophysical Observatory
- Harriet Creighton, 1929 – botanist, geneticist, professor of Botany, with Barbara McClintock proved that genetic recombination occurred through chromosomal crossover
- Dorothy Day, 1919 – plant physiologist
- Helen Wendler Deane, 1938 – histophysiologist
- Louise Dolan, 1971 – mathematical physicist, cosmological and superstring theorist
- Persis Drell, 1977 – physicist, director of the Stanford Linear Accelerator, dean of the Stanford University School of Engineering
- Katherine Freeman, 1984 – geoscientist, chemist, editor-in-chief of the Annual Review of Earth and Planetary Sciences
- Nina Gage, 1905 – leading teacher of modern nursing in China
- Muriel Gardiner, 1922 – psychoanalyst and psychiatrist, likely the basis for the character "Julia" in Lillian Hellman's Pentimento
- Winifred Goldring, 1909 – pioneering paleontologist
- Pauline Hald, 1926 – clinical chemist at Yale
- Judith Goslin Hall, 1961 – pediatrician and clinical geneticist
- Carol Handwerker – Reinhardt Schuhmann, Jr. Professor of Materials Engineering and Environmental and Ecological Engineering at Purdue University
- Harriet Louise Hardy, 1928 – pioneer in occupational health, first woman to become a full professor at Harvard Medical School
- Abigail Harrison, 2019 – sciences advocate, Internet personality
- Martha Haynes, 1973 – radio astronomer, won the Henry Draper Award for 3D visualization of the universe
- Erna Schneider Hoover, 1932 – computer scientist, invented computer switching of telephone traffic at Bell Labs
- Dorothea Jameson, 1942 – cognitive psychologist, expert in color and vision
- Alice C Jantzen, 1939 - occupational therapist, first President of the American Occupational Therapy Foundation
- Karestan C. Koenen, 1990 - Professor of Psychiatric Epidemiology, Harvard School of Public Health
- Mary Jeanne Kreek, 1958 – neurobiologist, best known for her work in the development of methadone therapy for heroin addiction, was named a Fellow of the New York Academy of Sciences, received an Alumni Gold Medal Award from Columbia University College of Physicians and Surgeons for "lifetime excellence in medicine", and Lifetime Achievement Award from the National Institute on Drug Addiction
- Rebecca Lancefield, 1916 – microbiologist, developed serologic classification of beta-hemolytic streptococci
- Story Landis, 1967 – neuroscientist, director of the National Institute of Neurological Disorders and Stroke
- Louise Zung-nyi Loh, 1924 – mathematician, physicist, college professor in China and US
- Nergis Mavalvala, 1990 – astrophysicist, 2010 MacArthur Foundation Fellowship, Dean of the MIT Institute of Science
- Martha McClintock, 1970 – biopsychologist, discoverer of human pheromones
- Louise McDowell, 1898 – physicist, one of the first women to work at the National Bureau of Standards
- Margaret Merrell, 1922 – biostatistician, first full female professor at Johns Hopkins Bloomberg School of Public Health
- Pamela Melroy, 1983 – astronaut, space shuttle commander
- Vivian Pinn, 1963 – pathologist, director of the Office of Research on Women's Health at the National Institutes of Health
- Charlotte Fitch Roberts, 1880 – professor of Chemistry, 1894–1917; one of the first women to receive a Ph.D. from Yale in 1894; head of the Wellesley Chemistry Department until her death in 1917
- Mabel Seagrave, 1905 – doctor, ran a hospital in France after World War I
- Isabelle Stone, 1890 – physicist, founder of the American Physical Society
- Chi Che Wang, 1914 – biochemist, professor at Northwestern University and the University of Cincinnati
- Isabel Bassett Wasson, 1918 – petroleum geologist and National Park Service ranger
- Naomi Weisstein, 1961 – professor of psychology, neuroscientist, author
- Mary Allen Wilkes, 1959 – computer pioneer, one of the first people to use a home computer
- Helen S Willard, 1915 - reconstruction aide and pioneer occupational therapist
- Brenda Pruden Winnewisser, 1961 – physicist, received a fellowship from the Alexander von Humboldt Foundation, has 122 research publications (as of 2014)
- Alexandra Worden, 1992 – microbial ecologist and biologist, fellow of the Canadian Institute for Advanced Research

=== Other ===
- Julia Collins, 2005 – holds second-longest Jeopardy! winning streak by a female contestant (2014–2021)
- Anya Corke, 2013 – chess player, Woman Grandmaster
- Isabel Darlington, 1886 – lawyer and first woman to gain admittance to the bar and practice law in Chester County, Pennsylvania
- Betty Freeman, 1942 – philanthropist, patron of contemporary classical music including John Cage, Philip Glass, and Pierre Boulez
- Asma Gull Hasan, 1997 – Muslim feminist writer, lawyer
- Mary Haskell (1873–1964) – educator
- Nadine Netter (born 1944) – tennis player
- S. Grace Nicholes – social reformer
- AJ Odasso, 2005 – editor, educator, novelist, and poet
- Georgia Pellegrini, 2003 – author, food blogger, chef and hunter
- Elisabeth Severance Prentiss, 1880s – philanthropist; namesake of the student dormitory, Severance Hall
- Ruth Rowland Nichols, 1924 – aviation pioneer
- Charlotte Anita Whitney, 1889 – women's rights and political activist, suffragist, Communist Party organizer

== Notable faculty ==
- Edith Abbott – social worker, educator, and author
- Lilian Armstrong – art historian
- Myrtilla Avery – classical scholar focused on Medieval art, former chair of Department of Art at Wellesley College and director of the Farnsworth Art Museum 1930–1937 Introduced the first art history classes at Wellesley & the earliest museum studies courses.
- Emily Greene Balch – economist, peace activist, winner of the Nobel Peace Prize
- Katharine Lee Bates – author of America the Beautiful; also Wellesley College alumna
- Carolyn Shaw Bell – economist
- Frank Bidart – poet, winner of the Pulitzer Prize for Poetry
- Laura Bornholdt – historian and dean of the college
- Harriet Boyd-Hawes – archaeologist
- Howard Mayer Brown – musicologist
- Judy Brown – physicist
- Mary Bunting – microbiologist and academic administrator
- Bryan E. Burns – archeologist
- Ellen Burrell – head of Pure Mathematics department, 1897–1916
- Alice Huntington Bushee – writer
- Mary Whiton Calkins – philosopher
- Annie Jump Cannon – astronomer
- Karl "Chip" Case – economist
- Dan Chiasson – poet
- Katharine Coman – economist
- Francis Judd Cooke – composer
- Rose Laub Coser – sociologist
- Sirarpie Der-Nersessian – art historian
- Carlos Dorrien – sculptor
- Katharine May Edwards – professor of Greek, classics scholar
- Alicia Erian – novelist
- Alona E. Evans – political scientist
- David Ferry – poet and translator
- Edmund Barry Gaither – art historian
- Marshall Goldman – economist and author
- June Goodfield – philosopher and historian of science
- Jorge Guillén – poet
- Ellen Hildreth – computer scientist
- Kathleen Hirsch – writer
- Walter Houghton – historian of Victorian literature
- Marian E. Hubbard – zoology professor
- Nannerl O. Keohane – political theorist; president of the college 1981–1993; also Wellesley College alumna
- Philip L. Kohl – anthropologist
- Hedwig Kohn – physicist
- Mary Lefkowitz – classical scholar; also Wellesley College alumna
- Tom Lehrer – singer-songwriter, satirist, pianist, and mathematician
- Jon D. Levenson – theologian
- Peggy Levitt – sociology
- Margaret Eliza Maltby – physicist
- Julián Marías – philosopher
- Tony Martin – historian
- Mildred H. McAfee – former president of Wellesley College, first director of the WAVES
- Louise McDowell – physicist, first U.S. woman to work at the National Bureau of Standards
- Alison McIntyre – philosopher
- Helen Abbot Merrill – mathematician (and alumna)
- Vladimir Nabokov – author
- James F. O'Gorman – architectural historian
- Julia Swift Orvis – taught history and political science 1899–1941
- Alice Freeman Palmer – educator, first woman president of a nationally known college (Wellesley College)
- Josephine Preston Peabody – poet, dramatist
- Ellen Fitz Pendleton – mathematician, former president of Wellesley College, alumna
- Robert Pinsky – poet
- Adrian Piper – philosopher
- Ruth Anna Putnam, philosopher and world-renowned expert in American pragmatism
- Judith Roitman – mathematician
- Richard Rorty – philosopher
- Paul J. Sachs – art historian
- Allen Sapp – musician
- Alice T. Schafer – mathematician
- Alan Schechter – political scientist
- Vida Dutton Scudder – writer, educator, welfare activist
- Mary Sears – oceanographer
- Marilyn Sides – writer
- Elaine Spatz‑Rabinowitz – artist
- Marion Elizabeth Stark – mathematician
- Emily Vermeule – classical scholar and archaeologist
- Claude Vigée – poet
- Alice Walker – author
- Sarah Frances Whiting – astronomer and physicist, founder of the Whitin Observatory
- Mary Emma Woolley – Bible scholar, academic administrator
- Richard Yarde – artist
- Mabel Minerva Young – mathematician
