= Judith Brown =

Judith or Judy Brown may refer to:

- Judi Brown Clarke (born 1961), née Brown, American politician and athlete
- Judie Brown (born 1944), American anti-abortion campaigner
- Judith Brown (sculptor) (1931–1992), American dancer, painter and sculptor
- Judith C. Brown (born 1946), American writer and historian
- Judith M. Brown (born 1944), British historian of modern South Asia
- Judy Brown (physicist) (born 20th century), American physicist and engineer
- Judy Brown (accountant) (born 1956), New Zealand accountancy academic
- Judith K. Brown, American phytopathologist
- Judy Brown, a character in the film Paddington
