= Lennie Copeland =

American mathematician (1881–1951)

Lennie Phoebe Copeland
- Born: March 30, 1881; Brewer, Maine
- Died: January 11, 1951 (aged 69); St. Petersburg, Florida
- Education: University of Maine; Wellesley College; University of Pennsylvania
- Occupations: Mathematician, professor
- Known for: Earned doctorate in mathematics before World War II

Lennie Phoebe Copeland (1881–1951) was an American mathematician and professor at Wellesley College, and was one of the few women to earn a doctorate in mathematics before World War II.

== Biography ==
Lennie Phoebe Copeland was an only child, born to Emma Stinchfield and Lemuel Copeland in Brewer, Maine, on March 30, 1881. She graduated from Bangor High School and then enrolled at the University of Maine, earning her BS in mathematics in 1904. With her degree in hand, Copeland returned to Bangor High School to teach math until 1910 until she left Maine for Wellesley College in Massachusetts to pursue a master's degree. She received her MA in mathematics in 1911 and immediately went to study at the University of Pennsylvania. There, she received her Sc.D. in 1913 with a dissertation titled, On the Theory of Invariants of n-Lines directed by Oliver Edmunds Glenn. She was immediately asked to join the faculty at Wellesley where she knew many esteemed mathematicians and ended up spending the remainder of her teaching career there. Her research centered on the algebra of invariants.

=== Educator ===
At Wellesley, Copeland began as an instructor 1913–1920, and moved to assistant professor 1920–1928, associate professor 1928–1937 and professor from 1937 until she retired in 1946 and was made professor emeritus.

In addition to teaching, she also developed and taught a course in the history of mathematics. As part of her research, she collected rare books, especially those about math recreations, and donated them to the Wellesley Treasure Room in the library. Copeland also authored a descriptive catalogue about the library's rare mathematical books.

When she and six members of the Wellesley mathematics department became members of the nascent Mathematical Association of America before April 1, 1916, they were charter members. Copeland often attended the MAA annual and summer meetings, and she served on the program committees for the national meetings of 1922 and 1923, chairing the latter one. Locally, she became the first woman to be named president of the New England Association of Teachers of Mathematics, 1925–1927.

=== Personal life ===
She participated in the Appalachian Mountain Club and served as its natural history counselor. She enjoyed travel and did so widely for many years, often with her friend and housemate, retired Wellesley mathematician Clara Eliza Smith, who died suddenly in May 1943 of a cerebral hemorrhage.

After retiring from Wellesley in 1946, Copeland moved to St. Petersburg, Florida, and lived with Carol S. Scott, a friend from the College. Lennie Phoebe Copeland died in St. Petersburg, on January 11, 1951, at the age of 69. A collection of Copeland's papers is available for researchers at Wellesley College.

== Honors ==
Copeland was awarded an honorary Doctor of Science degree by the University of Maine in 1948.

== Memberships ==
According to Judy Green, Copeland belonged to several professional societies.

- American Mathematical Society
- Mathematical Association of America (charter member)
- Phi Beta Kappa
- American Association for the Advancement of Science
- Sigma Xi
