= Agardy (surname) =

Agardy is a surname. Notable people with the surname include:

- Gábor Agárdy (1922–2006), Hungarian actor
- Tundi Spring Agardy (born 1957), American marine conservationist
