= Ellen Burrell =

American mathematics professor

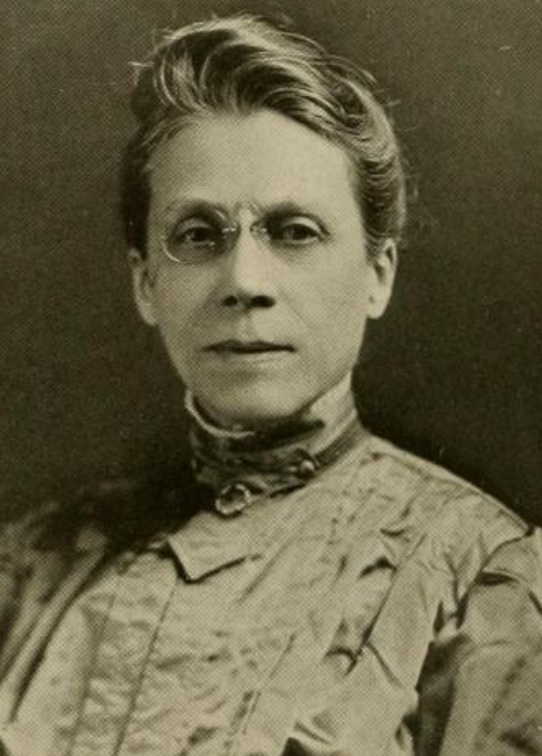
- Ellen Burrell, from the 1915 yearbook of Wellesley College
- Born: Ellen Louisa Burrell; June 12, 1850; Lockport, New York
- Died: December 3, 1938; Roxbury, Massachusetts
- Occupation: Mathematics professor

Ellen Louisa Burrell (June 12, 1850 – December 3, 1938) was an American mathematics professor, head of the Department of Pure Mathematics at Wellesley College from 1897 to 1916.

== Early life ==
Burrell was born in Lockport, New York, the daughter of Myron Louis Burrell and Mary Jones Burrell. She earned a bachelor's degree from Wellesley College in 1880, in the same class as her future colleagues Katharine Lee Bates and Charlotte Fitch Roberts. She went to Germany for further studies at Göttingen in 1896 and 1897.

== Career ==
Burrell taught at Rockford Seminary in Illinois for several years, from 1881 to 1886. She returned to Wellesley to teach in 1886. In 1897, as a solution to her contentious relationship with fellow mathematics professor Ellen Hayes, she was made head of the Department of Pure Mathematics (and Hayes became head of Applied Mathematics). Her department included professors Roxana Vivian and Helen Abbott Merrill. She and Hayes both retired from Wellesley in 1916, and the departments were reunited. She was also curator of the college's herbarium. Her class notes were privately published as "The Number System" and "Synthetic Projection Geometry".

Burrell attended the fourth colloquium of the American Mathematical Society in Boston in 1903, and another 1903 meeting of the society held at Columbia University. She was also active in the Association of Mathematics Teachers of New England. She visited the American School for Girls in Constantinople in 1907.

== Personal life ==
Burrell enthusiastically voted for Warren G. Harding for president in 1920. She died in 1938, aged 88 years, in Roxbury, Massachusetts. Her papers are in the Wellesley College Archives.
