= Maestre =

Maestre may refer to:

== People with the name ==
Maestre is an Italian surname. Notable people with the surname include:

- "Maestre Joan", an historical case which may have inspired the tale of the sailor Pedro Serrano
- Aureliano Maestre de San Juan (1828–1890), Spanish scientist
- Diomedes Díaz Maestre (1957–2013), Colombian singer
- Gabriel Maestre (born 1986), Venezuelan boxer
- Jennifer Maestre (born 1959), American artist
- Manuel Herrero Maestre (born 1967), Spanish footballer and manager
- Rafael Orozco Maestre (1954–1992), Colombian singer

== Fictional characters ==
- Maestres in A Song of Ice and Fire universe, an order of scholars, healers, messengers, and scientists, including such characters as:
  - Archmaestre Ebrose at the Citadel in Oldtown
  - Grand Maestre Pycelle, at the Red Keep in Kings Landing
  - Maestre Aemon Targaryen at Castle Black, at the Wall
  - Maester Wolkan at Castle Black, at the Wall
  - Qyburn, a former Maester who lost his chain for unethical experiments

== Other uses ==
- Maestre de campo, a rank created in 1534 by the Emperor Carlos V
- Maestre de Campo Island, encompassing the whole municipality of Concepcion, Romblon in the Philippines
- Maestre-Kallmann-Morsier syndrome, a genetic disorder

== See also ==
- Maestro
- Master (disambiguation)
