= Oliver Edmunds Glenn =

American mathematician

Oliver E. Glenn
- Born: October 3, 1878; Vevay, Indiana, US
- Died: November 17, 1959 (aged 81); Philadelphia, Pennsylvania
- Education: University of Pennsylvania
- Scientific career
- Fields: Mathematics
- Workplaces: University of Pennsylvania
- Doctoral advisor: George Hervey Hallett
- Doctoral students: Lowell Reed; Lennie Copeland

Oliver Edmunds Glenn (October 3, 1878 – November 17, 1959) was an American mathematician at the University of Pennsylvania who worked on finite groups and invariant theory.

He received the degrees of A.B. in 1902 and A.M. in 1903 from Indiana University Bloomington and the Ph.D. degree from the University of Pennsylvania in 1905. He married Alice Thomas Kinnard on August 18, 1903, and they had two sons, William James and Robert Culbertson. Glenn began his career instructing mathematics at Indiana University in 1902 and subsequently taught at Drury College (Springfield, Missouri). He joined the faculty of the University of Pennsylvania in 1906 where he became a full professor in 1914 and retired in 1930.

He was an Invited Speaker of the International Congress of Mathematicians in 1924 at Toronto, in 1928 at Bologna, and in 1932 at Zurich.

He died in 1959 in Philadelphia.
