= Anurag Agrawal (ecologist) =

American ecologist and biologist (born 1972)

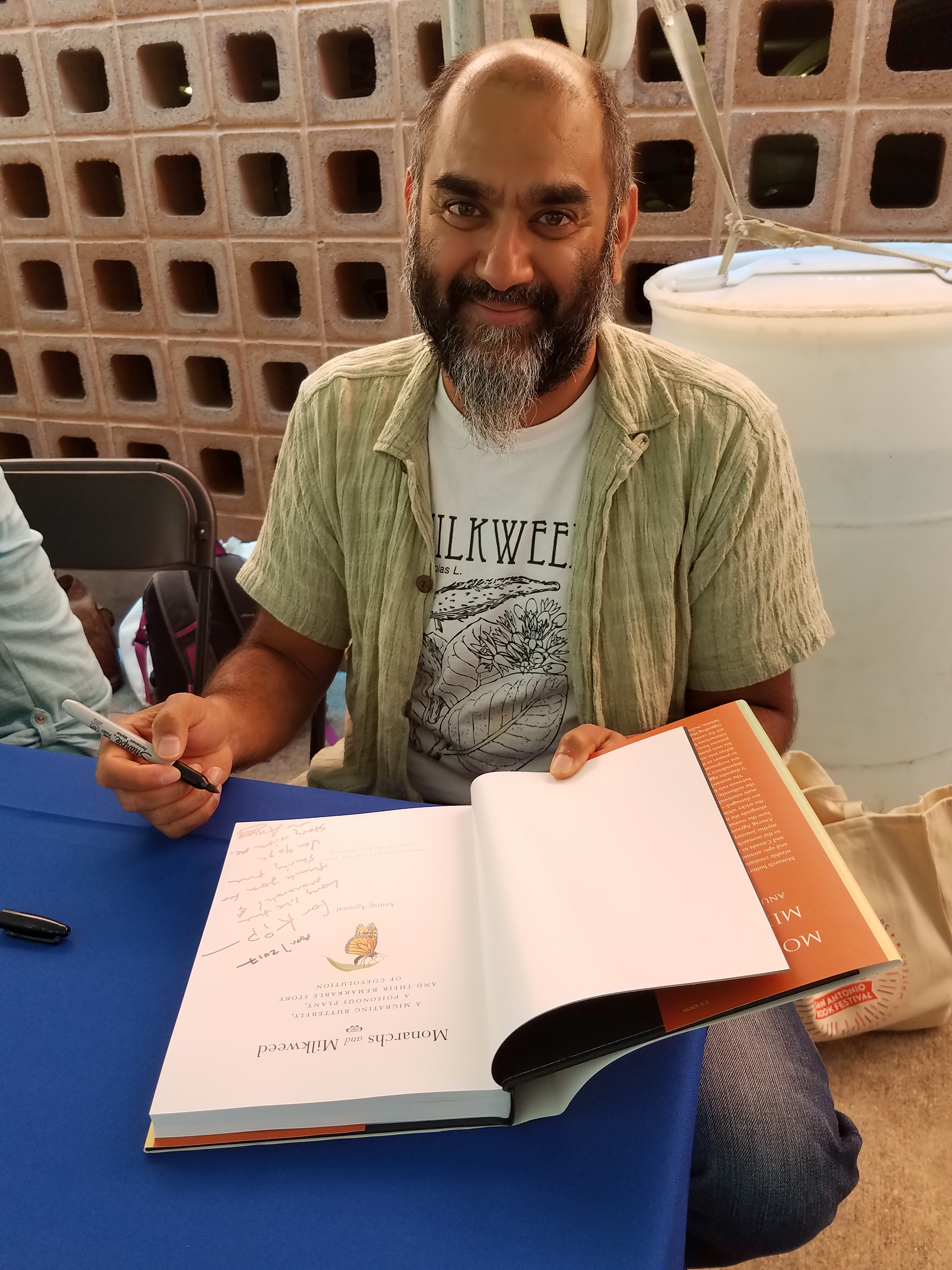
- Agrawal in March 2017
- Born: 1972 (age 53–54); Allentown, Pennsylvania, U.S.
- Education: University of Pennsylvania; University of California, Davis
- Known for: Studies of plant-animal interactions, especially milkweeds and monarch butterflies
- Spouse: Jennifer S. Thaler
- Awards: Ecological Society of America, Robert H. MacArthur Award, 2016
- Scientific career
- Fields: Ecology, Entomology, Evolutionary biology
- Workplaces: University of Toronto, Cornell University
- Thesis: Evolutionary ecology of phenotypic plasticity in plant resistance to insect herbivores (2000)
- Doctoral advisor: Richard Karban

Anurag Agrawal (born 1972) is an American professor of ecology, evolutionary biology, and entomology who has written over a 300 peer-reviewed articles, which earned him an h-index of 103. He is the author of a popular science book, Monarchs and Milkweeds from Princeton University Press, and is currently the James Alfred Perkins Professor of Environmental Studies at Cornell University.

== Life ==
Agrawal was born in 1972 in Allentown, Pennsylvania. He obtained both BA in biology and an MA in conservation biology from the University of Pennsylvania in Philadelphia after working with Daniel Janzen. In 1999, he earned a Ph.D. in population biology from the University of California, Davis. He then became a post-doctoral fellow at the University of Amsterdam. A year later, he became an assistant professor at the University of Toronto in the former department of botany. Since 2004, he has been a professor in the Department of Ecology and Evolutionary Biology and Department of Entomology at Cornell University in Ithaca, New York. He publishes with a fictitious middle initial (A.), and is sometimes confused with Canadian evolutionary biologist Aneil Agrawal.

== Research ==
His work is focused on the ecology and evolution of plant-insect interactions, including aspects of herbivory, community ecology, phenotypic plasticity, chemical ecology, coevolution, and phylogenetics. His current research includes work on New York state's biodiversity, the ecology of invasive plants, the biology of monarch butterflies, and the evolution of plant defense strategies. In addition to many scientific papers, his recent book Monarchs and Milkweeds has received acclaim from a wide audience, including the National Outdoor Book Award.

== Awards ==
- 1999 Young Investigator Award, American Society of Naturalists
- 2004 Early Career Award, National Science Foundation
- 2006 George Mercer Award, Ecological Society of America
- 2009 David Starr Jordan Prize
- 2012 Fellow of the American Association for the Advancement of Science
- 2013 Founders Memorial Award, Entomological Society of America
- 2016 Robert H. MacArthur Award, Ecological Society of America
- 2017 National Outdoor Book Award
- 2017 Fellow of the Ecological Society of America
- 2018 Silverstein-Simeone Lecture Award, International Society for Chemical Ecology
- 2019 Edward O. Wilson Naturalist Award
- 2021 Member of the National Academy of Sciences
