= Mathematical Excursions =

1933 book by Helen Abbot Merrill

Mathematical Excursions: Side Trips along Paths Not Generally Traveled in Elementary Courses in Mathematics
- Author: Helen Abbot Merrill
- Language: English
- Genre: Mathematics
- Publisher: Norwood Press (1933); Dover Publications (1957)
- Publication date: 1933

Mathematical Excursions: Side Trips along Paths Not Generally Traveled in Elementary Courses in Mathematics is a book on popular mathematics. It was written by Helen Abbot Merrill, published in 1933 by the Norwood Press, and reprinted (posthumously) by Dover Publications in 1957.

== Topics ==
The book is devoted to mathematical puzzles and pastimes, gathered from Merrill's experience as a teacher. It has 15 chapters, most on arithmetic and number theory but with one on geometry.

Its topics include squared triangular numbers and other sums of powers, Russian peasant multiplication, binary numbers, repeating decimals, magic squares, the irrationality of π, mechanical linkages, linear Diophantine equations, the 15 puzzle, perfect numbers, and some unsolved problems in number theory.

== Audience and reception ==
The book is written for a general audience, and is intended to spark the interest of high school students in mathematics. In general, only high school levels of algebra and geometry are needed to appreciate the book and solve its problems. It could be used as individual reading, or in mathematics clubs, and also for mathematics teachers looking for examples and demonstrations for their classes.

Of the original edition, reviewer David Eugene Smith wrote "the book ought to be in the hands of all teachers and on the shelves of all high schools and colleges". By the time of the 1957 reprint, reviewer Samuel L. Greitzer complained about its obsolete notation, as well as its uneven level of exposition and non-uniform inclusion of solutions to problems, and reviewer Roland Sprague noted that its treatment of perfect numbers was out of date. Nevertheless, Greitzer suggested that it would be an appropriate supplement in mathematics education at the secondary level.
