= Anne Toth =

Anne Toth is a technology policy and privacy executive. She is currently the Head of Data Policy at the World Economic Forum. Between 2014 and 2016 she was Vice President of Policy and Compliance Strategy and Vice President of People (Human Resources) at Slack. She has served on the Board of Directors of the Network Advertising Initiative (NAI) and the Family Online Safety Institute (FOSI). She also participated on the Future of Privacy Forum Advisory Board. Previously she was Head of Privacy for Google+ at Google and Chief Trust Officer at Yahoo!.

Toth has testified before the United States Congress and the Article 29 Working Party in Brussels on matters related to online privacy and data retention. She is a graduate of Wellesley College and pursued a Masters of Public Policy at the University of California, Berkeley.
