= Lilian Armstrong =

American art historian (1936–2021)

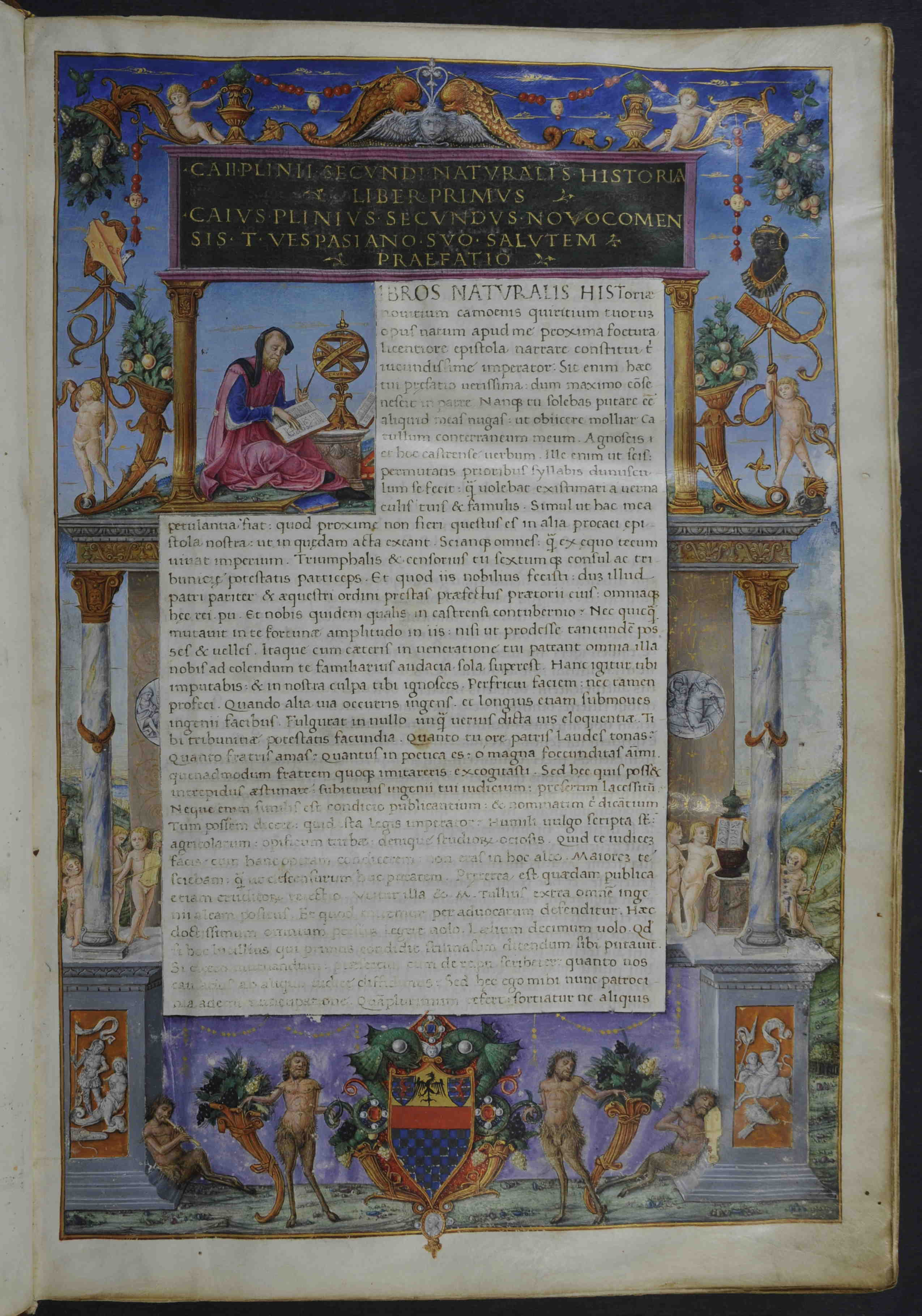
Pliny's Naturalis Historia, copied in 1481 by Nicolò Mascarino and illuminated by the "Master of the Pico Pliny". The Master of the Pico Pliny was a specialist area of research for Lilian Armstrong. Venice, Biblioteca Nazionale Marciana - ms. Lat. VI. 245 (2976), f. 3 (115).

Lilian Armstrong (May 4, 1936 – November 26, 2021) was an American professor of art at Wellesley College. She specialized in Italian Renaissance manuscripts and early printed books.

== Education ==
Armstrong received her PhD from the Department of Art History and Archaeology at Columbia University in 1966. Her doctoral thesis, in two volumes, was entitled The Paintings and Drawings of Marco Zoppo. Marco Zoppo was an Italian artist who lived in the fifteenth century. Rudolf Wittkower supervised her PhD. Before completing her PhD, Armstrong was awarded her undergraduate degree from Wellesley College, and a master's degree from Radcliffe College.

== Career ==
Armstrong focused her research primarily on Italian illuminated manuscripts, hand-illuminated incunabula, and woodcut illustration in early printed books of Venetian origin. She was Mildred Lane Kemper Professor of Art, the first holder of the college's prestigious chair. She retired in 2006, and in 2010 she was awarded an Andrew W. Mellon Emeritus Fellowship.

== Death ==
On November 26,2021, Armstrong died from an unexpected fatal heart failiure in her home in Wellesley, Massachusetts.

Following her death, she was described as 'an inspiration to generations of students and colleagues in her decades teaching' and as a pioneer as a woman scholar with a Venetian focus. Columbia University have launched a fund named after Armstrong to support graduate students in Venice at Casa Muraro. A Festschrift in her honour, The Art of the Renaissance Book, was published by Brepols in 2023 and edited by Ilaria Andreoli and Helena Szepe.

== Bibliography ==
- Petrarch’s Famous Men in the Early Renaissance: The Illuminated Copies of Felice Feliciano’s Edition. London: The Warburg Institute 2016.
- La xilografia nel libro italiano del XV sexcolo: Un percorso tra gli incunaboli del Seminario Vescovile di Padova, trans. by Lucia Mariani, ed. by Paola Maria Farina, Milan: EDUCatt, 2015.
- Lilian Armstrong, Piero Scapecchi, and Federica Toniolo, Gli Incunaboli della Biblioteca del Seminario Vescovile di Padova: Catalogo e Studi, ed. by Pierantonio Gios and Federica Toniolo, Padova, Istituto per la storia ecclesiastica padovana, 2008
- Studies of Renaissance Miniaturists in Venice, 2 vols., London, Pindar Press, 2003
- The Painted Page: Italian Renaissance Book Illumination, 1450-1550, ed. Jonathan J. G. Alexander, with contributions by Lilian Armstrong et al., exhibition catalogue, Royal Academy of Arts, London, and Pierpont Morgan Library, New York, 1994–1995, Munich, Prestel Verlag, 1994
- Renaissance Miniature Painters and Classical Imagery: The Master of the Putti and His Venetian Workshop, London, Harvey Miller Publishers, 1981.
- The Paintings and Drawings of Marco Zoppo (1966), New York, Garland Publishing Inc., 1976.
