= Florence Meier Chase =

American botanist

Florence Elizabeth Meier Chase
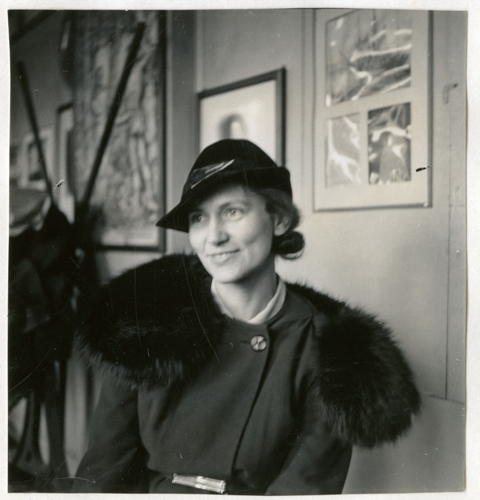
- Florence E. Meier Chase c. 1930
- Born: 1902, exact date unknown Springfield, Illinois
- Died: May 6, 1978; Manahawkin, New Jersey
- Education: Wellesley College, University of Geneva
- Known for: Research on algae
- Spouse: William Wiley Chase
- Scientific career
- Fields: Algae

Florence Elizabeth Meier Chase (1902 - May 6, 1978) was an American botanist who researched the interaction of sunlight and algae at the Smithsonian. She was a fellow of the American Association for the Advancement of Science and an honorary member of the Washington Botanical Society. She was married to Dr. William Wiley Chase and also assisted in his publication of articles on scientific and medical topics.

== Life ==
Chase was born in Springfield, Illinois. Chase received her B.A. from Wellesley College and her Ph.D. from the University of Geneva in Switzerland. She was a research assistant at the botany department at Columbia University before moving to Washington, D.C.

In Washington, she worked for the Smithsonian Institution at the Radiation Biology Laboratory (RBL), part of the Smithsonian Astrophysical Observatory, where she studied photosynthesis and its relationship to fluorescence. In her work on "Useful Algae" she also explored the use of macroscopic marine algae as food sources. She contributed to the Smithsonian's collections, donating plants from Spain. She died in Manahawkin, New Jersey in 1978 at the age of 75.

== Injury ==
While showing the visitors around in the Smithsonian Castle on February 14, 1937, Dr. Meier stepped back, and forgetting that the trap door was open behind her, fell down through it to the floor below, and broke her back. She was taken to Washington's Garfield Memorial Hospital. At the hospital, she would be cared for by Dr. William Wiley Chase, the head of the surgery department. This was their first meeting, and they eventually married.

== Publications ==
- Colonial formation of unicellular green Algae under various light conditions. Washington: Smithsonian Institution (1934).
- Cultivating Algae for scientific research. Washington: United States Government Printing Office (1933).
- Effects of intensities and wave lengths of light on unicellular green Algae. Washington: Smithsonian Institution (1934).
- Growth of a green alga in isolated wave-length regions. Washington: Smithsonian Institution (1936).
- Lethal action of ultra-violet light on a unicellular green alga. Washington: Smithsonian Institution (1932).
- Lethal effect of short wave lengths of the ultraviolet on the alga Chlorella vulgaris. Washington: Smithsonian Institution (1936).
- The microscopic plant and animal world in ultraviolet light. Washington: United States Government Printing Office (1935).
- Reactions to ultraviolet radiation. Washington: Smithsonian Institution (1937)
- Stimulative effect of short wave lengths of the ultraviolet on the alga Stichococcus bacillaris. Washington: Smithsonian Institution (1939).
- Useful algae. Washington: Smithsonian Institution. Annual Report of the Smithsonian Institution, 1941.
