= Karen Remmer =

American political scientist

Karen L. Remmer
- Occupations: Political scientist, academic, author and researcher

Academic background
- Education: B.A., political science M.A. Ph.D.
- Alma mater: Wellesley College; University of Chicago
- Thesis: Political Competition and Public Policy: The Impact of Party Development in Chile and Argentina (1974)

Karen L. Remmer is an American political scientist, academic, author and researcher. She is a professor emerita of political science at Duke University.

Remmer has authored over 80 publications. Her expertise lies in comparative politics and political economy with a particular focus on Latin America and the Caribbean. She has published widely on electoral competition, military rule, institutional change and political economy of Latin America. She is the author of Party Competition and Public Policy: Argentina and Chile, and Military Rule in Latin America.

Remmer was associate editor of the Latin American Research Review from 1981 till 2001. She has also served as a co-president of Rocky Mountain Council for Latin American Studies from 1979 till 1980.

== Education ==
Remmer obtained a bachelor's degree in political science from Wellesley College in 1966. She then enrolled at the University of Chicago and received her master's and doctoral degree in 1968 and 1974, respectively. She also studied as a post-graduate research student in the Department of Politics at the London School of Economics between 1968 and 1970.

== Career ==
Following her master's studies, Remmer held a brief appointment as a lecturer at Lewis and Clark College before joining the University of New Mexico in 1974 as professor of political science. She then left and took up an appointment as a full professor at Duke University in 2001.

== Research ==
Remmer's research in the field of comparative politics has focused on political economy and political institutions with central emphasis on Latin America.

=== Political economy of Latin America ===
Beginning in the mid-1980s, Remmer wrote series of articles exploring the relationship between economics and politics in the Latin American region. Her research on the electoral impact of the debt crisis of the 1980s provided evidence that economic crisis provoked electoral instability and undermined the support of incumbents without giving rise to political extremism, political polarization, or otherwise undermining democratic institutions. The resilience of democracy in the region was further emphasized in her analysis of the sustainability of democracy in South America in the post-1944 period. Drawing on comparisons between democratic and authoritarian regimes, her research underlines the impact of political institutions on regime durability by showing that economic performance has conditioned the risk of authoritarian, but not democratic, breakdown.

A closely related vein of research explores the impact of democracy on policy performance. Drawing on a study of IMF stabilization programs over a thirty-year period, her research shows that in comparison with authoritarian regimes, democracies have been no less likely to introduce or implement stabilization programs and no more likely to break down in response to their political costs. Analyzing policy responses to economic crisis, she further challenged the conventional wisdom about the impact of regime differences by providing evidence that democracies do not respond less effectively to economic crisis than authoritarian regimes. In related research on the impact of elections on macroeconomic performance in Latin America, Remmer provided evidence that competitive elections have enhanced rather than undermined the capacity of political leaders to address macroeconomic problems. Her analysis suggests that the relationship between democracy and economic performance is more effectively captured by a “political capital” model than by its more traditional political business cycle alternative.

=== Subnational politics in Argentina ===
Remmer's co-authored 2000 study offers evidence that interactions between party competition and the structure of the public sector shape fiscal performance at the subnational level and thereby condition the capacity for national economic adjustment. As the Argentine experience concretely demonstrates, in political systems characterized by federalism and decentralized government spending even relatively successful national adjustment efforts may be undermined by contradictions between local and national policy.

Exploring electoral choice at the provincial level, Remmer also highlights the potential for slippage between policy responsibility and electoral accountability in decentralized political systems. Another study of subnational elections in Argentina draws upon both aggregate data and survey evidence to underline the interdependence of electoral assessments and choice processes across levels of government. Not only do assessments of national performance influence subnational elections in Argentina; subnational assessments also influence the choices of voters in national elections in accordance with what might be described as a ‘reverse coattails’ effect.

Remmer's research has also documented patronage business cycles in Argentina, showing that at the provincial level patronage spending expands significantly in the year following elections.

=== Analysis of government size ===
Remmer has explored the issue of government size in two research articles. The first draws a link between foreign aid and government growth in the 1970-99 period. Drawing on subnational comparisons, the second explores the consequences of political scale for government spending. It suggests that the tendency for small political units to have big governments is not merely the result of economies of scale in the provision of public goods, but a reflection of the greater pressures for public spending faced by politicians in smaller and more homogeneous political units.

=== Investment treaty arbitration ===
Remmer's recent research has focused on the topic of investment treaty arbitration. In the first of her three papers on disputes arising under the protection of investment treaties, she explores their impact on foreign investment flows and state reputational rankings. A second research contribution analyzes variations in dispute outcomes, which have increasing favored states over investors. Due to unequal access to legal knowledge and expertise, however, the legal playing field has remained biased against lower and middle income states, whose odds of winning a dispute compare unfavorably with those of wealthier states. A third paper explores variations in the incidence of state involvement in investment treaty disputes in Latin America over the 1987-2014 period.

=== Institutional and electoral change ===
Remmer's research has also contributed to the study of institutional and electoral change in Latin America. Focusing on the individual level of analysis, she has examined vote switching in Argentina, the rise of leftist populist governance, and democratization.

== Awards and honors ==
- 2009 - Dean's Award for Excellence in Mentoring, Duke University
- 2014 - Bingham Powell Graduate Mentoring Award, Comparative Politics Section, American Political Science Association

== Bibliography ==
=== Books ===
- Party Competition and Public Policy: Argentina and Chile (1984) ISBN 9780803238718
- Military Rule in Latin America (1989) ISBN 9780044454793

=== Selected articles ===
- Remmer, K. L. (1986). The politics of economic stabilization: IMF standby programs in Latin America, 1954–1984. Comparative Politics, 19(1), 1-24.
- Remmer, K. L. (1990). Democracy and economic crisis: the Latin American experience. World Politics, 42(3), 315–335.
- Remmer, K. L. (1991). The political impact of economic crisis in Latin America in the 1980s. American Political Science Review, 85(3), 777-800.
- Remmer, K. L. (1992). The process of democratization in Latin America. Studies in Comparative International Development, 27(4), 3-24.
- Remmer, K. L. (1993). The political economy of elections in Latin America, 1980–1991. American Political Science Review, 87(2), 393–407.
- Remmer, K. L. (2002). The politics of economic policy and performance in Latin America, Journal of Public Policy, 22(1), 29–59.
- Remmer, K. L. (2004). Does foreign aid promote the expansion of government? American Journal of Political Science, 48(1), 77–92.
- Gélineau, F., & Remmer, K. L. (2006). Political decentralization and electoral accountability: The Argentine experience, 1983–2001. British Journal of Political Science, 36(1), 133–157.
- Remmer, K. L. (2007). The political economy of patronage: Expenditure patterns in the Argentine provinces, 1983–2003. Journal of Politics, 69(2), 363–377.
- Remmer, K. L. (2012). The rise of leftist-populist governance in Latin America: the roots of electoral change, Comparative Political Studies, 45(8), 947–972.
- Remmer, K.L. (2019). Investment treaty arbitration in Latin America, Latin American Research Review, 2019, 54(4); 795–811.
