= Judy Brown (accountant) =

New Zealand accountancy academic

Judy Brown FRSNZ
- Born: 1956 (age 69–70)

Academic background
- Education: Victoria University of Wellington
- Thesis: Accounting and Industrial Relations: a Critical Theory Perspective (1995)

Academic work
- Discipline: Accountancy
- Institutions: Victoria University of Wellington
- Website: University profile

Judy Anne Brown FRSNZ (born 1956) is a New Zealand accountancy academic. She is currently a full professor at the Victoria University of Wellington. In 2024, she was elected a Fellow of the Royal Society Te Apārangi.

== Academic career ==
Brown completed a 1995 PhD thesis titled Accounting and Industrial Relations: a Critical Theory Perspective at Victoria University of Wellington, before rising to full professor. Her research interests are the social and political context of accounting, including industrial relations, corporate governance, sustainability assessment, critical theory and social accounting.

Brown received a six-year FRST grant for 'Building Capacity for Sustainable Development' and then a $685,000 of Marsden grant for 'Dialogic Accounting: The Challenge of Taking Multiple Perspectives Seriously'.

In 2024, Brown was elected a Fellow of the Royal Society Te Apārangi.

== Selected works ==
- Brown, Judy, and Jesse Dillard. "Dialogic accountings for stakeholders: On opening up and closing down participatory governance." Journal of Management Studies 52, no. 7 (2015): 961–985.
- Brown, Judy, and Jesse Dillard. "Integrated reporting: On the need for broadening out and opening up." Accounting, Auditing & Accountability Journal 27, no. 7 (2014): 1120–1156.
- Blackburn, Nivea, Judy Brown, Jesse Dillard, and Val Hooper. "A dialogical framing of AIS–SEA design." International Journal of Accounting Information Systems 15, no. 2 (2014): 83–101.
- Brown, Judy, and Jesse Dillard. "Agonizing over engagement: SEA and the "death of environmentalism" debates." Critical Perspectives on Accounting 24, no. 1 (2013): 1-18.
- Brown, Judy, and Jesse Dillard. "Critical accounting and communicative action: On the limits of consensual deliberation." Critical Perspectives on Accounting 24, no. 3 (2013): 176–190.
