= Clara Eliza Smith =

American mathematician

Clara Eliza Smith (May 20, 1865 – May 12, 1943) was an American mathematician specializing in complex analysis who became the Helen Day Gould Professor of Mathematics at Wellesley College.

Smith was the daughter of Georgiana and Edward Smith, of Northford, Connecticut. She studied at Mount Holyoke College, then a seminary, while also studying art at Yale University. Her studies in the seminary program included geometry and trigonometry, but the college did not offer degrees at that time. She completed the program in 1885. After working as an art teacher at the Bloomsburg State Normal School in Pennsylvania from 1889 until 1898, she returned to Yale for graduate study in mathematics in 1901, along the way earning a bachelor's degree by examination from Mount Holyoke in 1902. In 1904, she completed a Ph.D. at Yale University; her dissertation, Representation of an Arbitrary Function by means of Bessel's Functions, concerned Bessel functions.

She joined the Wellesley faculty in 1906, as a substitute teacher of mathematics. She then briefly taught at the Western College for Women in Oxford, Ohio, but by 1908 she had returned to Wellesley as a regular instructor. In 1924 she became the Helen Day Gould Professor. She retired in 1934.

At Wellesley, Smith became known for her course in complex analysis. She also wrote two textbooks with Helen Abbot Merrill, Selected Topics in Higher Algebra (Norwood, 1914) and A First Course in Higher Algebra (Macmillan, 1917).
