= Susan Foh =

American biblical scholar

Susan T. Foh
- Citizenship: American
- Education: Wellesley College; Westminster Theological Seminary
- Occupation(s): Biblical scholar, author

Susan T. Foh is an American biblical scholar who studied at Wellesley College and Westminster Theological Seminary. She is the author of "Women and the Word of God: A Response to Biblical Feminism" (1978). Foh is best known for her 1975 article, "What Is the Woman's Desire?", in which she argues that the "desire" mentioned in Genesis 3:16 is actually a desire to dominate.

== Biography ==
Foh studied at Wellesley College and Westminster Theological Seminary. She is the author of Women and the Word of God: A Response to Biblical Feminism (1978).

Foh is best known for her 1975 article, "What Is the Woman's Desire?". In it she argues that the "desire" mentioned in Genesis 3:16 is actually a desire to dominate. Foh's interpretation has been very influential, especially among complementarians. It is found in some modern Bible translations such as the New Living Translation, which renders the last part of the verse as "And you will desire to control your husband, but he will rule over you."

Daymon Johnson considers Foh as one of four "Reformed neo-traditionalist" women (along with Edith Schaeffer, Elisabeth Elliot, and Mary Pride) who have made a significant contribution to American fundamentalism.
