= Mildred Codding =

American medical illustrator (1902–1991)

Mildred B. Codding
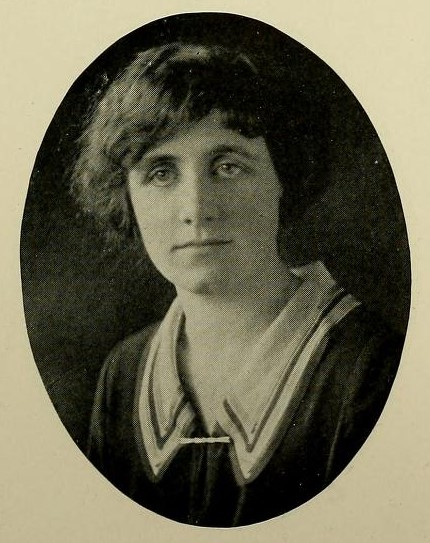
- Born: 1902; Somerville, Massachusetts, U.S.
- Died: 1991 (aged 88–89)
- Education: Wellesley College; Columbia University; Johns Hopkins University
- Known for: Medical illustration
- Style: Carbon dust technique
- Awards: American Institute of Graphic Arts recognition for Atlas of Pelvic Operations

Mildred B. Codding (1902 – 1991) was an American medical illustrator. Her illustrations are featured in numerous textbooks and academic journal articles.

== Biography ==
Codding was born in Somerville, Massachusetts. She graduated from Wellesley College in 1924 and earned a master's degree in Zoology and Genetics from Columbia University in 1926. Wishing to combine her interests of anatomy and art, she entered a two-year program in medical illustration at Johns Hopkins University, studying under German medical illustrator Max Brödel.

After one year of study at Johns Hopkins, Codding moved to Boston to work for American neurosurgeon Harvey Cushing at the Department of Surgery at Harvard Medical School and at the Peter Bent Brigham Hospital, where Cushing was surgeon-in-chief. Codding had been recommended to Cushing by Brödel. She worked with Cushing from 1928 until his retirement from the Brigham in 1932, illustrating many of his well-known publications. Her operative drawings and anatomical diagrams can be found on nearly every page of Cushing and Louise Eisenhardt's 1938 retrospective book Meningiomas: Their Classification, Regional Behavior, Life History, and Surgical End Results.

Codding continued work at the Peter Bent Brigham Hospital, providing illustrations for many well-known publications. She contributed to the Atlas of Surgical Operations (1939), written by Eliott Cutler and Robert Zollinger, which is considered a staple of surgical education and was used as a field guide for American military medical personnel during World War II. Her drawings feature in the Atlas of Pelvic Operations (1953) by Langdon Parsons and Howard Ulfelder, which was recognized for its outstanding illustrations by the American Institute of Graphic Arts.

After her retirement from the Peter Bent Brigham Hospital in 1968, Codding spent 12 years working with John Shillito on his Atlas of Pediatric Neurosurgical Operations, which was published in 1981.

Codding was a practitioner of the carbon dust technique of drawing commonly used in 20th century medical and scientific illustrations. She also performed operative photography.

Codding occupied an important position in the history of medical and scientific illustration. According to author Christy di Frances:

Codding’s surgical sketches can certainly be contextualized as generative boundary crossings on multiple levels: they are the unique contributions of a woman in a male-dominated field, of an artist-scientist operating within an overwhelmingly quantitative environment, and of a professional championing drawing in an age when photography and film held powerful sway. Her work spans decades and transgresses social, as well as academic, norms of the era. It melds scientific clarity with humanistic qualities—all the while offering a fascinating subtext of a philosophical inquiry that is so eloquently conveyed through the vehicle of art.
