= Mary Cunningham Agee =

American business executive and author

Mary Cunningham Lucia Agee
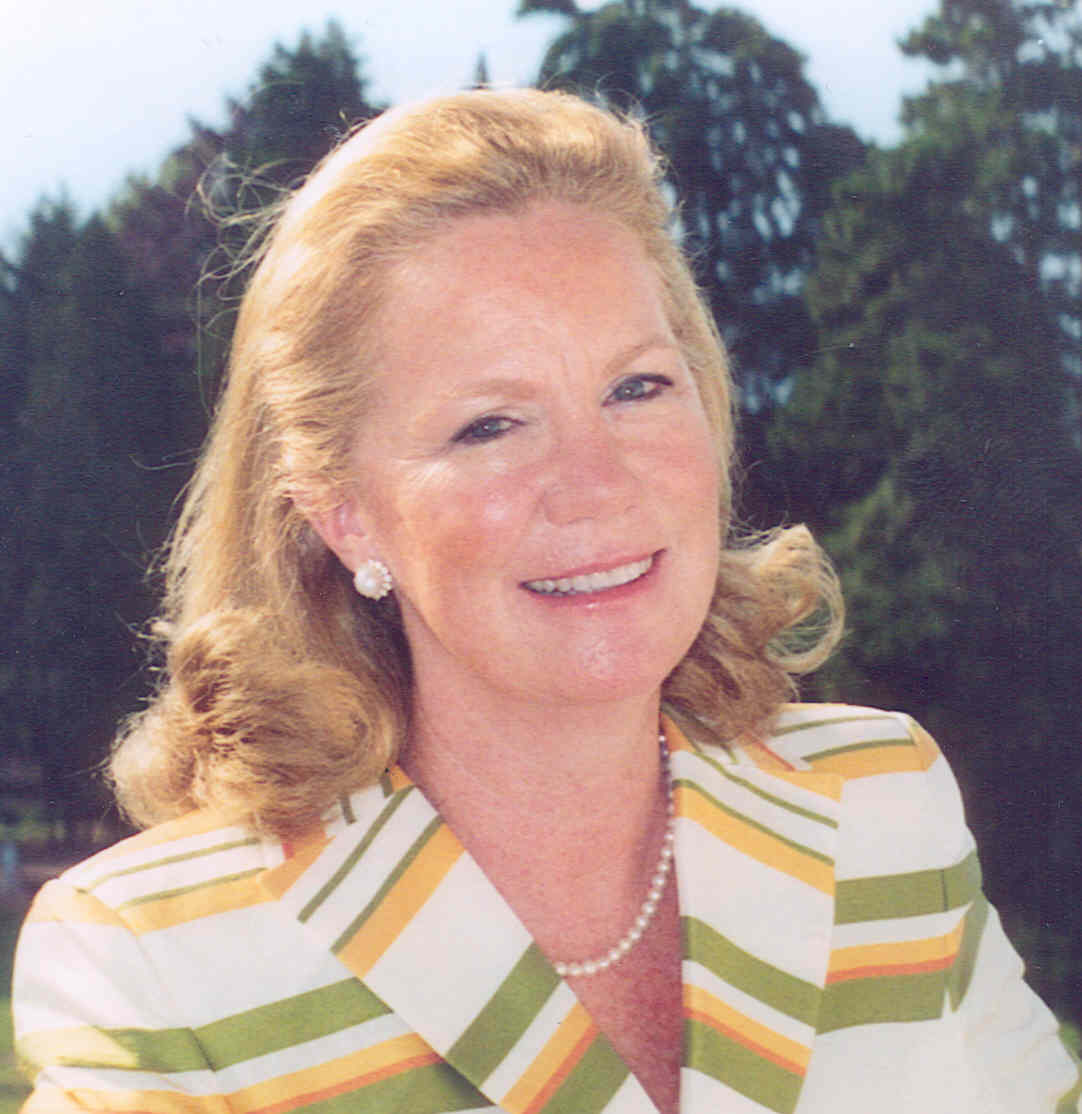
- Mary Agee
- Born: September 1, 1951 (age 74); Falmouth, Maine, U.S.
- Education: Wellesley College (BA); Harvard Business School (MBA)
- Employers: Bendix Corporation; Joseph E. Seagram and Sons; The Nurturing Network
- Spouses: Howard Gray (div. 1980) William Agee (m. 1982; died 2017)

Mary Cunningham Agee (born September 1, 1951) is an American business executive and author. She served in the top management of two Fortune 100 companies in the 1980s, one of the first women to do so, and was voted one of the "25 Most Influential Women in America" by World Almanac in 1981 and 1982. Agee is a managing partner of the Semper Charitable Foundation and CEO of the family's boutique wine business, Aurea Estate Wines, Inc.

Agee is the founder of The Nurturing Network (TNN), an international charitable organization which throughout its 30 years of service has taught about the need for empowerment among the most disadvantaged in society.

== Early years ==
Cunningham was born in Falmouth, Maine, to Irish-American parents. When she was five years old, her parents separated. Her mother moved her four children to Hanover, New Hampshire, where a relative, Monsignor William Nolan, a chaplain at Dartmouth College, offered paternal support for the family.

== Education ==
Cunningham graduated from Hanover High School in 1969. She worked summers on Cape Cod as a short-order cook and as a bank teller to supplement her college tuition scholarship. She enrolled at Newton College of the Sacred Heart (now merged with Boston College) in Newton, Massachusetts, and was elected class president. She was awarded a full academic scholarship to attend Wellesley College, where she transferred for her sophomore year. She won a Slater Fellowship to study law and ethics at Trinity College, Dublin, for her junior year abroad and received two Danforth Nominations to continue her studies in ethics and moral philosophy at the graduate level. She graduated Phi Beta Kappa and magna cum laude from Wellesley in 1973 with a B.A. in logic and philosophy.

She graduated in 1979 from the Harvard Business School with an MBA in finance and international business. The HBS dean referred to Cunningham as having the "best chance of being the first female graduate of the Business School to become chairman of a non-cosmetic company."

== Career and personal life ==
Cunningham was employed on Wall Street in the Corporate Banking Department of the Chase Manhattan Bank and in the Corporate Finance Department of Salomon Brothers. On graduation from Harvard Business School, she accepted a management position as executive assistant to the CEO of the Bendix Corporation, William Agee.

At Bendix, she was quickly promoted to vice president of Strategic Planning by Agee. Following public accusations of an affair with Agee, Cunningham resigned on October 8, 1980. Stanford University Business School made Cunningham's experience a case study in its course, "Power and Politics in Organizations".

Cunningham's autobiography, "Powerplay - What Really Happened at Bendix" chronicles her departure from the firm. Following her resignation, she accepted the position of vice president of Strategic Planning at Joseph E. Seagram and Sons where she reported to both president Phil Beekman, and CEO Edgar Bronfman, Sr. Within a year, she was promoted to executive vice president of the newly formed Seagram Wine Company, overseeing the development and implementation of Seagram's worldwide wine strategy.

Cunningham and her first husband, financial executive Howard Gray, were divorced in 1980. In June 1982, she married Agee. A 2018 New York Times article recognized Cunningham as an early advocate for equality in the workplace for women and the “strange confluences of events” that led to her husband’s death in the prior year. The Agees were married for 35 years.

== The Nurturing Network ==
Mary Cunningham Agee founded The Nurturing Network following the death of her first child, Angela Grace, in a late trimester miscarriage in January 1984. That loss prompted Agee to investigate the availability of resources for women whose pregnancies end through abortion due to lack of economic, educational or social support. She founded The Nurturing Network to provide women with access to resources, counseling and advice. It is a consortium of volunteers, professional service providers, pregnancy resource centers and faith-based initiatives that has provided tangible resources to individuals seeking their support. Agee's book Compassion in Action presents her story of the Network's program over 20 years. In addition to counseling, Agee's educational role at TNN has included writing and motivational speaking. Her work has been featured in publications such as The Wall Street Journal, Reader's Digest,U.S. News & World Report, The Washington Post, and Good Housekeeping, and she has been profiled on American radio and television programs such as CBS's 48 Hours, and James Dobson's Focus on the Family.

Agee was an early advocate of establishing a common ground. Peter Jennings referred to Ms. Agee's common ground position as "the demilitarized zone" in his televised three hour report, "The Next Civil War" on ABC News Forum.

== Affiliations ==
Agee serves on the Emeritas Board of FADICA and the Board of Overseers for the Aquinas House at Dartmouth College. She is a fellow of the Dominican School of Philosophy and Theology in Berkeley, California.

Agee has served on the boards of First Women's Bank of New York, the Catholic Schools Foundation in Boston, the Gregorian Foundation, the Graduate School of Business at University College Dublin, the Culture of Life Foundation, the Thomas More Law Center's advisory board, Loyola College in Maryland, the Hoffman Institute, and the National Council for Adoption. She is a founding member of the Napa Valley Chapter of Legatus.

== Awards and honors ==
Agee has received honorary doctorates from Franciscan University of Steubenville, Loyola College, Stonehill College, Franklin Pierce College, Chestnut Hill College, Notre Dame College and the Dominican School of Philosophy and Theology in Berkeley.

In the 1980s, Good Housekeeping voted Agee in their 100th Anniversary Edition as one of "100 Young Women of Promise", and she was included among the YWCA's Academy of Women Achievers. Her business awards include the inaugural Ambassador of the Year Award from Legatus, the ITV Woman of the Year Award from the Roman Catholic Archdiocese of New York, the John Paul II Award from the Institute for the Psychological Sciences, and the Ex corde Ecclesiae Award from the Cardinal Newman Society.

Agee also received the Economic Equity Award from the Women's Equity Action League and the Centennial Medal of Honor from the Columbus School of Law at the Catholic University of America. Her views were included in "American Women Activists' Writing - An Anthology, 1637-2002." In 2017, she was selected for inclusion in the publication, "Wine Country Women of Napa Valley" which featured leaders in the community.
