= Judith K. Brown =

American phytopathologist

Academic background
- Education: University of Arizona

Academic work
- Discipline: Phytopathology
- Institutions: University of Arizona
- Main interests: Geminiviridae, Whitefly-related viruses

Judith K. Brown is an American phytopathologist noted for study of viruses that affect plants. In particular geminiviruses and Whitefly involved viruses. She has a PhD from the University of Arizona and teaches there. She was an associate editor of Phytopathology for three years and in 2003 a delegate for the National Academy of Sciences Frontiers in Science Symposium in Istanbul. In 2015 she became an American Academy of Arts and Sciences fellow.
