= Sophie Kim =

South Korean entrepreneur (born 1983)

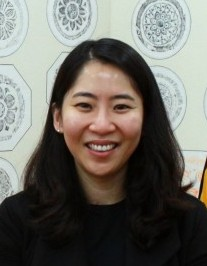
- Kim in 2022
- Born: Kim Seul-ah; 16 June 1983 (age 42); Ulsan, South Korea
- Education: Wellesley College (BA)
- Occupations: Entrepreneur; business executive
- Years active: 2014–present
- Known for: Founder and CEO of Kurly

Kim Seul-ah (Korean: 김슬아; born 16 June 1983), better known as Sophie Kim, is a South Korean entrepreneur who is the founder and chief executive officer (CEO) of Kurly, the parent company of grocery delivery service Market Kurly.

== Early life and education ==
Kim was born on 16 June 1983 in Ulsan, South Korea, to parents who both worked as physicians. She attended the Korean Minjok Leadership Academy. In 2003, Kim attended Wellesley College, and graduated cum laude with a Bachelor of Arts in political science in 2006.

== Career ==
=== Early career ===
In 2007, Kim began working for Goldman Sachs in Hong Kong, working in bonds, and subsequently McKinsey & Company in 2010. In 2012, she worked at Temasek Holdings. In 2013, she returned to South Korea to work at Bain & Company's branch in the country.

=== Kurly (2014–present) ===
Kim founded The Farmers in 2014, launching with only 30 products as an online grocery retailer in 2015. The Farmers was branded to Kurly Inc. in 2018.

As of 2024, Kurly has raised US$761 million in venture capital from investors including CJ Logistics, Sequoia Capital, and SK Networks. Kurly operates Market Kurly, which allows customers in the Gyeonggi Province to receive orders ordered before 11 p.m. by 7:00 a.m the next morning.

In 2021, Kurly initiated plans to IPO on the New York Stock Exchange, raising pre-IPO funding of $210 million at a $3.3 billion valuation. The company shifted plans to list on the Korean Exchange instead; Bloomberg News reported that they were seeking to raise US$1 billion. Kurly called off IPO plans in 2023.

In 2024, Kurly rebooted plans for an IPO at a targeted valuation of $2.3 billion, after recording its first quarter of operating profit.

== Recognition ==
In 2019, Kim was included on Forbes' "Asia's Power Businesswomen" list.
