= Lois Juliber =

American businesswoman (born 1949)

Lois D. Juliber
- Born: Brooklyn, New York City
- Education: Bachelor of Arts; Master of Business Administration
- Alma mater: Wellesley College; Harvard Business School
- Occupation: Business executive
- Employer: Colgate-Palmolive
- Known for: Senior executive roles at Colgate-Palmolive
- Title: Former Vice Chairman
- Awards: Financial Women's Association Woman of the Year (1995)

Lois D. Juliber (born 1949) is an American businesswoman.

== Early life and education ==
Lois Juliber was born in Brooklyn, New York City in 1949. She grew up on Long Island. She graduated from Wellesley College in 1971 and received an MBA from Harvard Business School in 1973.

== Career ==
Juliber worked for General Foods for fifteen years, and ended her career at the company as vice president. She joined Colgate-Palmolive in 1988 as a VP, and was appointed chief technology officer in 1992. She was promoted to executive vice president for Developed Markets in 1997, then chief operating officer in 2000, and finally vice chairman in 2004.

She sits on the boards of directors of Goldman Sachs and Kraft Foods. She has sat on the board of DuPont.

== Philanthropy ==
She serves as Chairman of the Mastercard Foundation. She is also a member of the boards of trustees of Wellesley College, Girls, Inc. and Women's World Banking. She is also a member of the President's Council at Olin College. She received the Financial Women's Association Woman of the Year Award in 1995, the Starlight Association Award for Corporate Leadership, and the American Advertising Foundation Award for Diversity Leadership.
