= Jennifer S. Thaler =

American entomologist

Jennifer S.Thaler
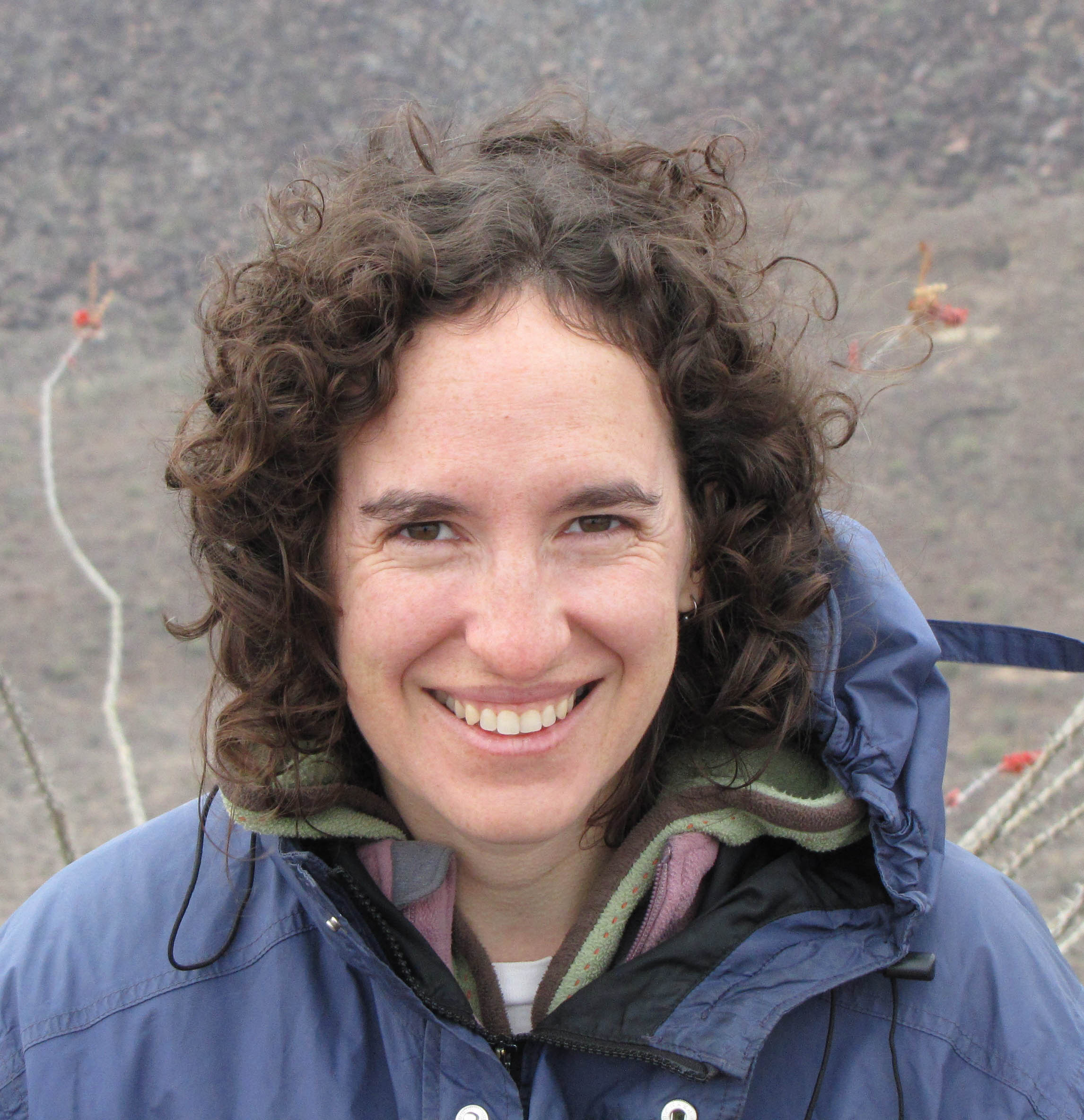
- Education: Wellesley College, University of California at Davis
- Spouse: Anurag Agrawal
- Scientific career
- Fields: Entomology, chemical ecology
- Workplaces: University of Toronto; Cornell University
- Thesis: Induced Plant Resistance: Linking Chemical Mechanism with Populations across Three Trophic Levels (1999)
- Doctoral advisor: Richard Karban
- Other academic advisors: Richard Bostock, Marcel Dicke
- Website: lab website

Jennifer S. Thaler is an American entomologist who is a professor at Cornell University.

== Education ==
Thaler attended Wellesley College as an undergraduate, receiving a bachelor's degree in biology in 1993, and writing a thesis about Temperature-dependent Predation of the Rove beetle (Lathrobium negrum). In 1993, Thaler worked as a summer research assistant at the Harvard Forest, where she worked on a project titled Macrosite Correlation Between Vegetation and Butterfly Diversity. She received her PhD in Entomology from the University of California, Davis in 1999, working under the supervision of Richard Karban. Thaler's PhD research focused on the interactions between tomato plants, beet armyworms, and parasitic wasps, resulting in a thesis titled Induced Plant Resistance: Linking Chemical Mechanism with Populations across Three Trophic Levels. Thaler investigated insect defense and crosstalk between jasmonate and salicylate signaling pathways in plants. She published a single-author paper in Nature showing that jasmonate induction of plant defenses increases parasitism of caterpillars feeding on these plants. During a second postdoctoral position with Marcel Dicke at Wageningen University, Thaler published further research on direct and indirect defenses in jasmonate-deficient plants.

== Research ==
Thaler was an assistant professor at the University of Toronto from 2000 to 2004. She moved to Cornell University as an assistant professor in 2004, was promoted to associate professor in 2006, and became a professor in the Entomology Department in 2015. Thaler's current research involves species interactions and the chemical ecology of Solanaceae, including tomato, potato, and tomatillo. Specifically, insect prey responses to the risk of predation have been major focus of her research for the past several years. An ongoing project in the Thaler lab, funded by the United States Department of Agriculture - Agriculture and Food Research Initiative, is titled Using Colorado Potato Beetle Responses to Predators to Maximize Pest Control.

Thaler's research publications have been cited over 9,000 times. Articles about Thaler's research on plant-herbivore interactions have been published by the Financial Times (2000), Targeted News Service (2012), and US Official News (2017).

== Awards ==
- American Society of Naturalists Early Career Investigator Award (2000)
- Faculty Fellow, Atkinson Center for a Sustainable Future (2011–present)
- Thomas and Nina Leigh Distinguished Alumni Award, University of California, Davis (2017)
