= Joan Wallace-Benjamin =

- Education: Wellesley College; Brandeis University
- Occupation: Non-profit executive
- Organization(s): The Home for Little Wanderers; Urban League of Eastern Massachusetts

Joan Wallace-Benjamin is a non-profit executive in Boston, Massachusetts. She was the president and CEO of The Home for Little Wanderers from May 2003 until her retirement in January 2018.

== Biography ==
Wallace-Benjamin graduated from Wellesley College with a BA in psychology and received her Ph.D. from the Heller School for Social Policy and Management at Brandeis University.

Wallace-Benjamin was CEO of the Urban League of Eastern Massachusetts (ULEM) until 2000. While there she worked on expanding employment training opportunities for the people. The ULEM created an award in her name to honor her legacy, and it is presented to a nonprofit leader who exemplifies exceptional leadership and compassionate approach to serving the community.

Prior to joining The Home in 2003, Wallace-Benjamin served as a consultant with Whitehead Mann, a global executive recruiting firm; president and chief executive officer of The Urban League of Eastern Massachusetts for 11 years; director of operations for Boys and Girls Clubs of Boston; deputy director of ABCD Head Start, and a research analyst for Abt Associates.

In November 2006 Governor-Elect Deval Patrick named Wallace-Benjamin as his chief of staff. In this role, she helped the governor to move the administration's policy, legislative and political agenda forward. She stepped down from this position in 2007.

== Awards ==
- 2002: Academy of Women Achiever's Award from Boston YWCA
- 2002: Humanitarian Award from the National Conference for Community and justice
- 2003: Boston's 100 Women of Power, Boston Magazine, May 2003 edition
- 2003: Lifetime Achievement Award from Rosie's Place, Boston
- 2003: Lady Baden-Powell Good Scout Award from Boston Minuteman Council, Boy Scouts of America
- 2004: Exceptional Women Award for Community Service from Magic 106.7,
- 2005: Pinnacle Award, Achievement in Management Non-Profit from the Boston Chamber of Commerce
- 2007: Civil Rights Award from Urban League, April 2007
- 2010: Henry L. Shattuck Public Service City Champion Award, October 2010
- 2011: Boston's 50 Most Powerful Women, Boston Magazine. February 2011 edition

Wallace-Benjamin holds honorary doctorates from the University of Massachusetts Amherst, Newbury College, Chestnut Hill, MA, Curry College, Milton, MA, Bridgewater State University, and New England School of Law, Boston, MA.
