= Louise Sherwood McDowell =

American physicist

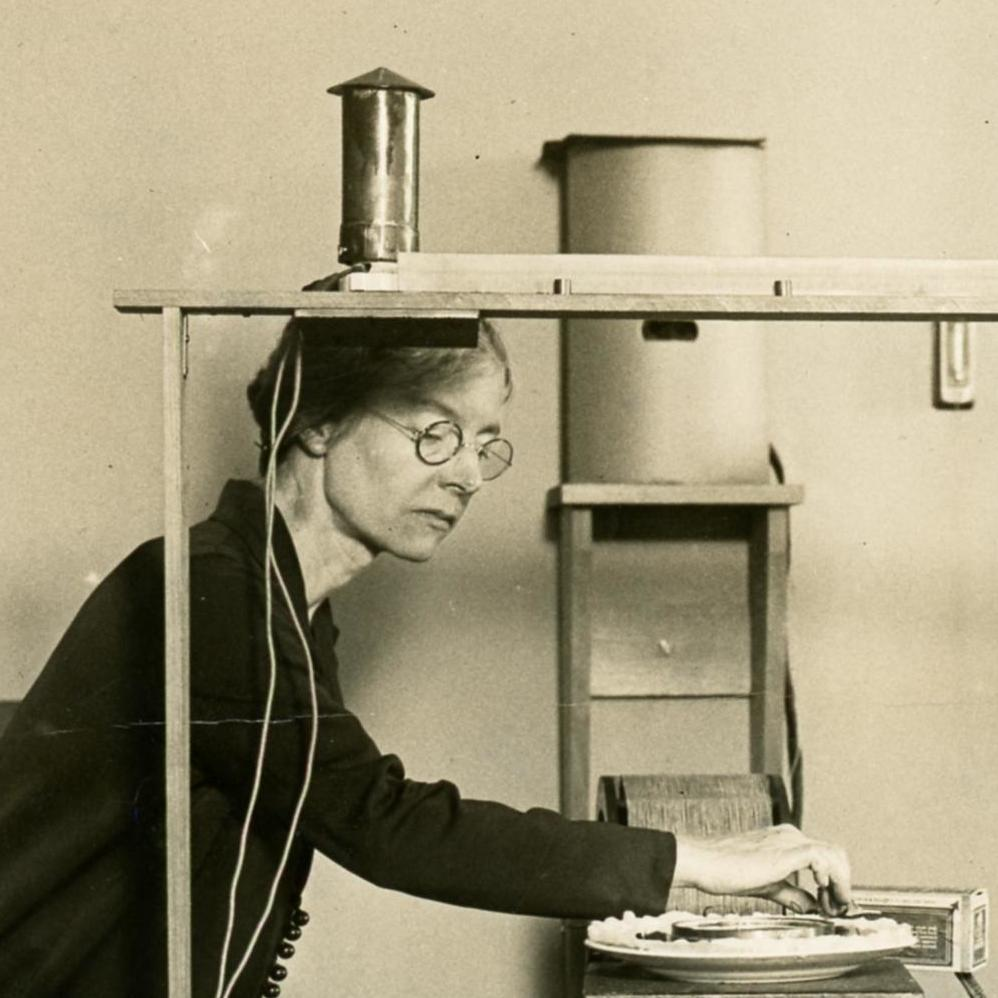
- adjusting an experiment at Wellesley.jpg
- Born: September 29, 1876; Wayne, New York, U.S.
- Died: July 6, 1966 (aged 89); Wellesley, Massachusetts, U.S.
- Education: Wellesley College, B.A. 1898; Cornell University, M.A. 1907; Cornell University, Ph.D. 1909
- Scientific career
- Fields: Dielectrics; Luminescence
- Workplaces: Wellesley College

Louise Sherwood McDowell (29 September 1876 - 6 July 1966) was an American physicist and educator. She spent most of her career as a professor of physics at Wellesley College and is best known for being one of the first female scientists to work at the United States Bureau of Standards, now the National Institute of Standards and Technology.

== Early life and education ==
Louise McDowell was born in Wayne, New York, to Francis Marion and Eva (Sherwood) McDowell. McDowell received her B.A. in 1898 from Wellesley College. Following graduation she worked as a high school teacher of English, science, and mathematics until 1905.

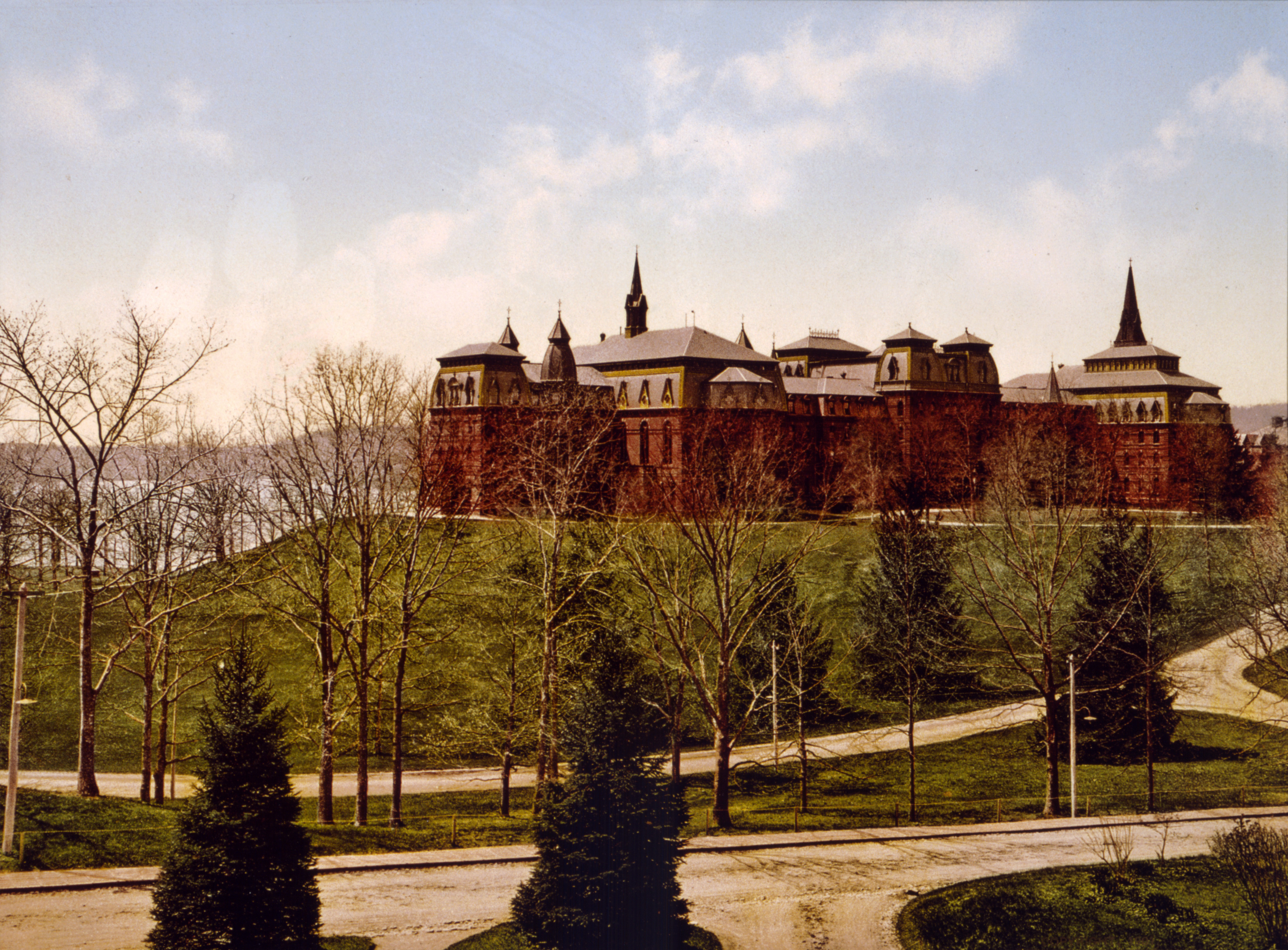
Wellesley College circa 1901

She was then admitted for graduate studies to Cornell University. The chair of the physics department, Edward Nichols was supportive of women in physics. McDowell worked on short-wave radiation under Ernest Merritt. She earned an M.A. in 1907 followed by a Ph.D. in 1909. McDowell attended Cornell at approximately the same time as Frances Wick. The two became friends and later collaborated on research.

== Career ==
After receiving her Ph.D., McDowell returned to work at Wellesley College in 1909 as an instructor in the physics department. After Sarah Frances Whiting's retirement from the physics department in 1912, McDowell served as department chair until 1945. During her tenure as chair, McDowell oversaw the rebuilding of the department after the 1914 fire which destroyed College Hall. The physics department, which had been housed on the upper floors of the building, lost all of its demonstration and research equipment.

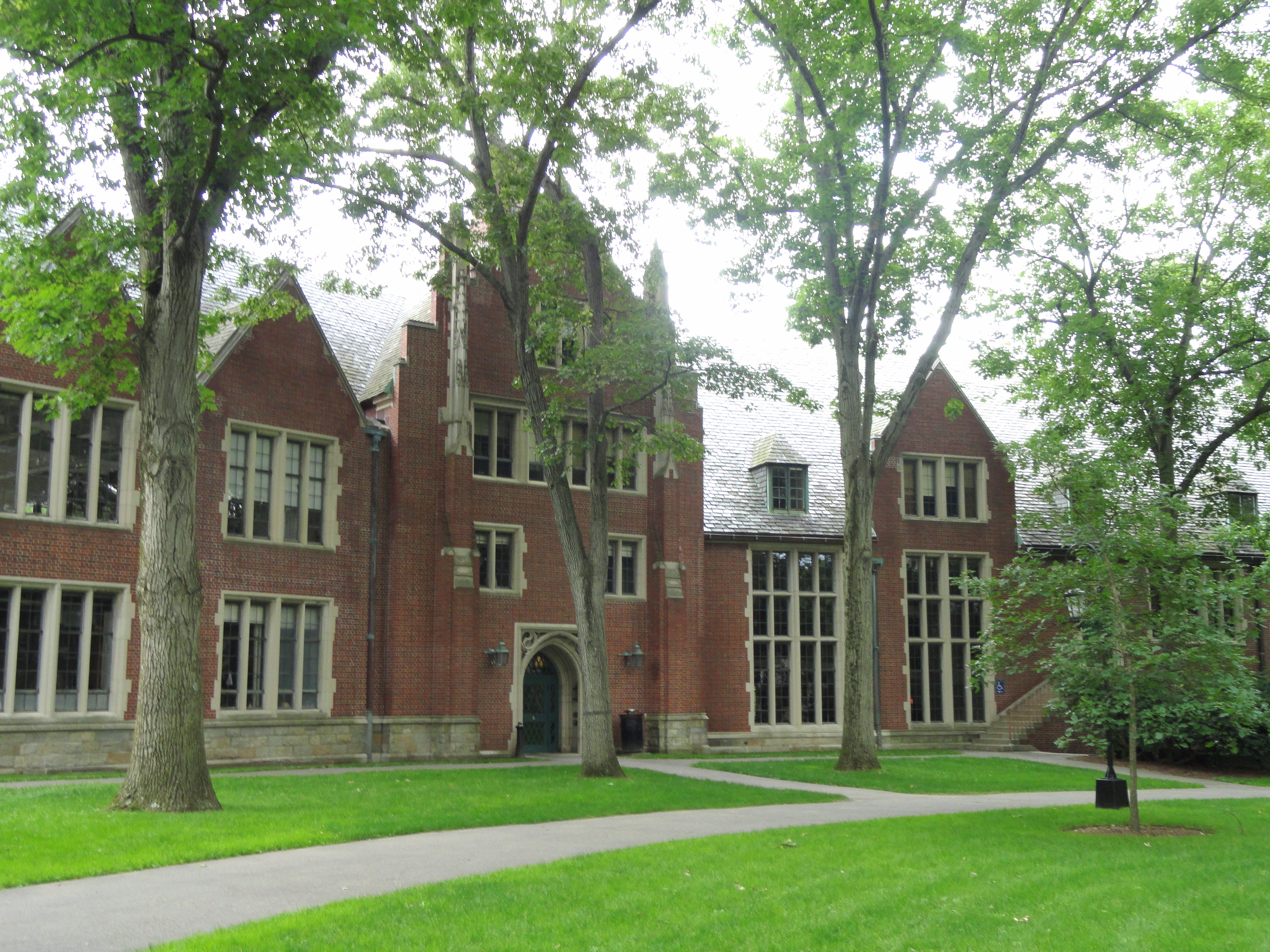
Pendleton Hall at Wellesley College

In 1918 during World War I, McDowell took a leave of absence from Wellesley when she was hired by the National Institute of Standards and Technology to conduct research on radar. She was the first female physicists, and the first female Ph.D., to work at the institute.

McDowell was a fellow of the American Physical Society and American Association for the Advancement of Science, a member of the Optical Society of America, and vice president for the American Association of Physics Teachers. McDowell was one of nine women to join the Optical Society of America in its first decade.
