= Maude Gillette Phillips =

American author, educator and animal welfare activist

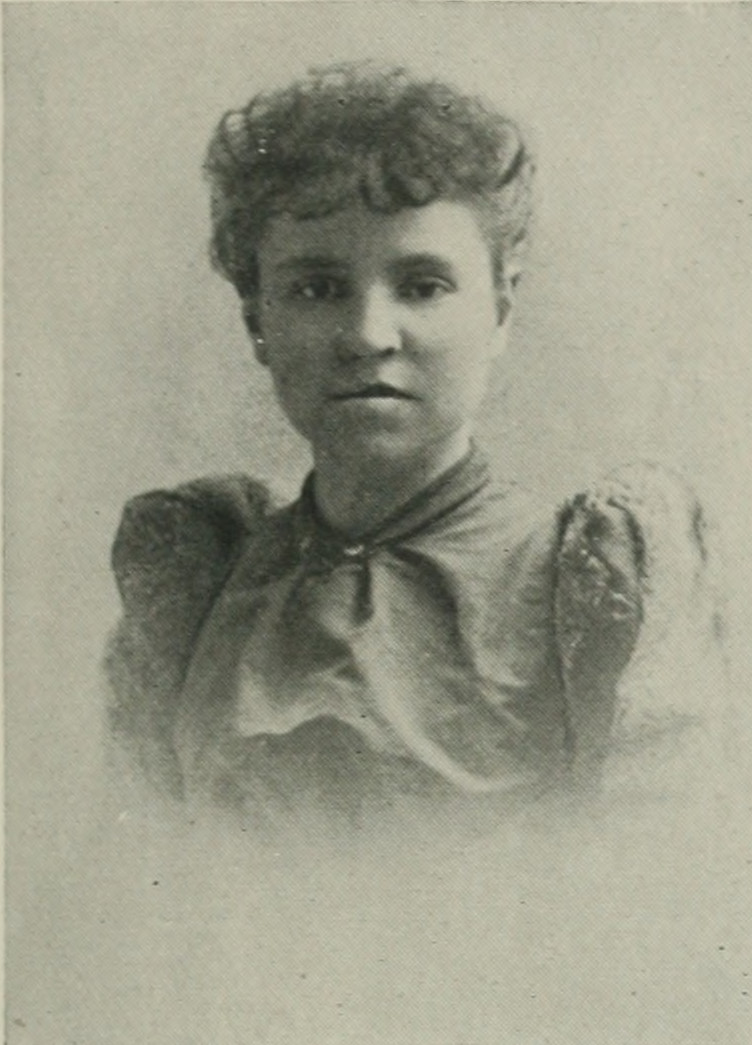
- Photo in A Woman of the Century
- Born: August 9, 1860; Springfield, Massachusetts, U.S.
- Died: Unknown
- Education: Wellesley College
- Occupations: author; educator
- Writing career
- Pen name: (various)
- Language: English
- Notable work: Popular Manual of English Literature

Maude Gillette Phillips (August 9, 1860 – July 31, 1951) was an American author, educator and animal welfare activist. She was the author of Popular Manual of English Literature. Phillips was a prolific writer for magazines in fiction and criticisms under pen names. Known for her wide social experience, she seemed to be more a woman of the world than a scholar or author.

== Early life and education ==
Maude (or Maud) Gillette Phillips was born in Springfield, Massachusetts, August 9, 1860. She was a daughter of George Nelson and Elizabeth (Gillette) Phillips. On the paternal side, she came from one of the oldest Dutch families in New York State; this family was still holding in possession the house built by Peter Phillips, who came to the United States 200 years earlier and purchased his land of a Native American chief. Through her mother, she descended from General Thomas Eaton, of Revolutionary fame. Her mother's father traced his ancestry back to France.

Phillips was educated at Springfield High School and by private tutors. In 1878, she entered the sophomore class of Wellesley College and was graduated in 1881.

== Career ==
The literary work of Phillips consisted of miscellaneous articles and short stories published in various periodicals, some of them under pen-names, in the line of criticism and fiction. She published a Popular Manual of English Literature (New York City, 1885). That work was characterized as the best of its kind in its day. It was carried out upon a philosophic system, that recognized all literature as a unit based upon national and international influences. A characteristic feature was its colored charts, providing ocular summaries of the contemporary civilians, authors, scientists, philosophers and artists of each age in Great Britain, France, Germany, Italy and Spain. Phillips also wrote articles in behalf of animals, being especially interested in animal philanthropy.

She was a member of Sorosis (New York City), Springfield Woman's Club, College Club, and the New York Theatre Club. Phillips was President of the Blue Cross Society, an animal welfare organization in Springfield, Massachusetts. Philips was influential in forming the Bald Eagle Protection Act which was passed in 1940.

== Personal life ==
Phillips' home was always in Springfield, Massachusetts, though she spent her winters in New York. She died on 31 July 1951 in West Springfield.

== Selected works ==
- A Popular Manual of English Literature (1885)
- Animalology (1920)
