= The Nurturing Network =

International charitable organization

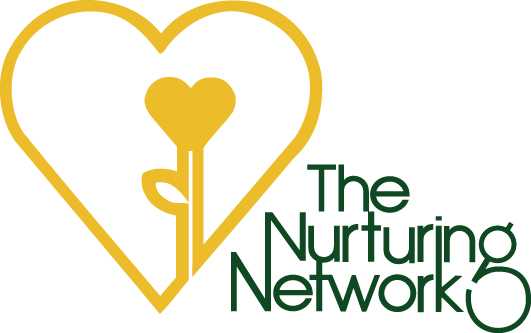
- Abbreviation: TNN
- Formation: 1985
- Legal status: 501(c)(3) not-for-profit
- Purpose: Service and education
- Headquarters: Napa Valley, CA
- Location: Worldwide
- Founder and CEO: Mary Cunningham Agee
- Website: www.nurturingnetwork.org

The Nurturing Network, founded by American business executive and author, Mary Cunningham Agee, is an international charitable organization dedicated to relieving abuse, neglect and exploitation. The organization states that its purpose is to provide educational resources and support to those who are most vulnerable.

The Nurturing Network describes its strategic approach as collaborative. Their mission states that the provision of education, training, service and mentoring in cooperation with individuals, foundations, corporations and compatible organizations is an effective method for defeating all forms of human bondage.

== History and founding ==
The loss of her first child in a second trimester miscarriage in 1984, caused Agee to examine the scope of resources available to women whose pregnancies are terminated through abortion. Agee reported research that revealed, "Nine out of ten women experiencing a crisis pregnancy feel they have only one option: abortion." This awareness prompted Agee to found the Nurturing Network in an effort to increase the availability and range of alternatives for women confronting this situation. The Network's founding documents reflect the view that women wanting to exercise their choice for birth often do not have the financial, medical, social or emotional resources necessary to carry out this decision. In 1985, The Agee's sold their vacation home to generate start-up funds to form the 501c3 charitable organization. Agee reported at the time of founding TNN and subsequently in "Senate testimony" that, "Most government and social programs were specifically designed to meet the needs of unwed teenagers. There was little support for college or working women who were expected to be able to take care of themselves." Agee sought to fill this void by raising awareness that this segment of women were, "Most likely to face family rejection, social stigma, and educational or career discrimination."

== Founding philosophy ==
Freedom of choice: TNN bases its program on the fundamental concept expressed by its Founder, Mary Cunningham Agee, that "freedom of choice without options is meaningless." With access to complete information in a supportive, unbiased, non-judgmental environment, "women will be free to make sound decisions for themselves and their children."

Personal worth: Documents about the organization's mission and philosophy written by Agee state that "The Network, through its connection to thousands of local volunteers and other programs, seeks to enhance the self-esteem of every woman served – without regard to race, creed or economic circumstances."

Growth through suffering: The Nurturing Network's Founder emphasizes in her speeches and writing that, "Personal growth is often achieved through personal suffering. A positive response to a crisis pregnancy has the potential to catalyze significant personal insight along with a deepened compassion that will expand to benefit many others."

== Client service ==
Since its founding, the Nurturing Network (TNN) reports having served thousands of women by mobilizing volunteer resource members throughout the United States and in 33 foreign countries. Mary Cunningham Agee's book, "Compassion in Action: Maternal Profiles in Courage," features the stories of the thousands of women whom TNN has helped in its first two decades of service. One third of the women who seek assistance from TNN are the result of referrals from crisis pregnancy centers.

== Member resources and collaboration ==
The Nurturing Network leveraged its resources by recruiting local "Clusters" of resources in communities and college campuses nationwide. TNN volunteer members offered services in core resource areas by providing a supportive home environment, emotional counseling, employment, legal and medical services, educational opportunities and other forms of support. The Network's service program emphasized the importance of collaboration. utilizing its website, word of mouth and media coverage to communicate its mission and support other programs whose goals are compatible.

== Inadequacy of the public debate ==
The Nurturing Network's Founder states that the experience of having an unplanned pregnancy, "Has, unfortunately, become synonymous with having only one viable option: Abortion. This has divided well-intentioned people and organizations into polarized camps of 'pro-choice' and 'pro-life.'" Agee contends that "since these two concepts are not logical opposites, the issue can never be resolved through rhetoric or political debate." The organization's presents its non-confrontational style as a prototype of how many divisive issues could be approached in a healing way.

The Nurturing Network has publicly taken the position that, "legislative battles, rhetorical debates and judgmental protests over abortion have tended to overlook the imminent and practical needs of the women about whom people are arguing." In print and broadcast media, Agee repeatedly urges the need to "move beyond political differences in order to provide practical assistance to women and children at a vulnerable time in their lives."

== Broad objective ==
The Network describes its educational mission as, "Offering society a meaningful way to participate in building a society in which the dignity of each individual is respected." A founding principle states that, "If we can communicate respectfully on pivotal issues, progress in achieving the broader goal of peace in our families, our businesses and our institutions, will be made."
