= Louise Zung-nyi Loh =

Chinese-born educator (1900–1981)

- 陆慎仪
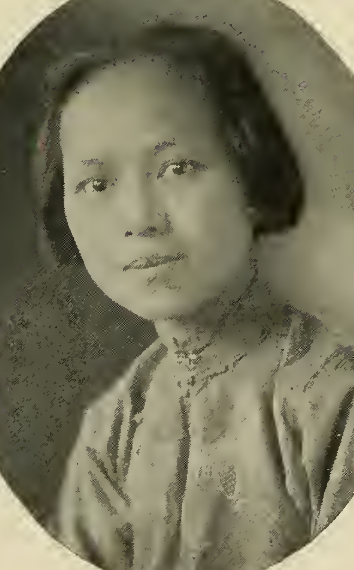
- Louise Zung-nyi Loh, from the 1924 yearbook of Wellesley College
- Born: Loh Zung-nyi; March 10, 1900; Jiangsu, China
- Died: April 25, 1981 (aged 81); Ohio, U.S.
- Other names: Shenyi Lu
- Occupations: Mathematician, physicist, educator

Louise Zung-nyi Loh (simplified Chinese: 陆慎仪; traditional Chinese: 陸慎儀; pinyin: Lù Shènyí) (March 10, 1900 – April 25, 1981) was a Chinese mathematician, physicist, and educator. She taught mathematics and physics in China from 1925 to 1948, and in the United States after 1948.

== Early life and education ==
Loh was born in Jiangsu. She attended Ginling College in 1920 and 1921, and Wellesley College from 1921 until her graduation in 1924. At Wellesley she was chair of the Chinese students' club. She earned a master's degree in physics and mathematics at Cornell University in 1925. Her thesis at Cornell was titled "The Effect of Temperature on the Absorption of Fluorescein" (1925). She pursued further studies at Oxford from 1935 to 1937. and was a graduate student at the University of Michigan in 1952.

== Career ==
Loh taught mathematics and physics from 1925 to 1948, at Ginling College, Central University, and Hunan University. She was acting dean of Ginling College in 1946 and 1947. She was a founding member of the Chinese Mathematical Society, and a member of the Mathematical Association of America the American Association of Physics Teachers, and the American Physical Society.

During the Nanjing Massacre in 1927, Loh warned foreign faculty at Ginling College of the approaching danger: "It was she who went to every laboratory and class room and ordered foreign teachers to the faculty house at once," recalled a fellow Wellesley alumna. She also retrieved the contents of the college safe, and organized emergency clothing for the evacuees. She was mentioned in missionary Minnie Vautrin's diary, conferring with Vautrin and Wu Yi-fang about the school's future.

Loh returned to the United States in 1948, and taught mathematics and physics at Wellesley College, Smith College, Wilson College, Western College for Women. From 1956 to 1964, she worked as a physicist at the Wright-Patterson Air Force Base.

== Personal life ==
Loh died in 1981, aged 81 years, in Ohio. She left money to establish the Louise Zung-nyi Loh Scholarship Fund at Ohio State University, to support students interested in East Asian studies.
