= Dorothy Day (plant physiologist) =

American plant physiologist

- Born: 1896
- Education: Wellesley College, University of Wisconsin
- Scientific career
- Fields: Plant physiology

Dorothy Day (born 1896) was an American plant physiologist.

== Education and career ==
Dorothy Day received an A.B. degree from Wellesley College in 1919; an M.S. from the University of Wisconsin in 1925; and her Ph.D. in plant physiology from that institution in 1927. She also attended the University of Chicago in 1929 and Cornell University in 1942–1943.

Day's career encompassed positions in academia, with private corporations, and at government agencies. Her teaching work began in 1921, as an instructor at Hood College. She also taught and researched at the University of Wisconsin; Mills College; Smith College for twelve years, where she held the title of associate professor from 1937 to 1942; Cornell University; the University of Minnesota; MacMurray College, as associate professor from 1950 to 1952; Westminster College; and Brigham Young University as a visiting professor of botany in 1958 and 1960. Dr. Day was the chairman of the local committee and New England Section of the American Society of Plant Physiologists in 1942. During World War II, job opportunities for women expanded, and as a result, she took her first positions in private industry. She worked as a plant physiologist for the California Central Fibre Corporation (1943–1944); Alaska Research Laboratories as a microbiological consultant (1952–1954); and the Bio-Sci Information Exchange from 1954 to 1955. Day was a microbiologist with the Quartermaster Corps from 1946 to 1949, and a mycologist for the Naval Shipyard in Philadelphia in 1949. Her research interests included plant physiology, nutrition, and tissue culture.

In September 1935, Day attended the sixth International Botanical Congress in Amsterdam.

== Selected publications ==
- Day, Dorothy (2 November 1928). "Some Effects on Pisum sativum of the Lack of Calcium in the Nutrient Solution". Science. 68 (1766): 426–427. Bibcode:1928Sci....68..426D. doi:10.1126/science.68.1766.426-a. PMID 17833178. S2CID 43755668.
- Day, Dorothy (October 1929). "Some Effects of Calcium Deficiency on Pisum sativum". Plant Physiology. 4 (4): 493–506. doi:10.1104/pp.4.4.493. PMC 440081. PMID 16652630.
- Day, Dorothy (October 1935). "Some Chemical Aspects of Calcium Deficiency Effects on Pisum sativum". Plant Physiology. 10 (4): 811–816. doi:10.1104/pp.10.4.811. PMC 439203. PMID 16653319.
- Day, Dorothy (January 1939). "Plant Physiology in the Women's Colleges". Plant Physiology. 14 (1): 179–181. doi:10.1104/pp.14.1.179. PMC 438244. PMID 16653544.
- Day, Dorothy (July 1940). "Starch Formation in Tobacco Plants Deficient in Potassium". Plant Physiology. 15 (3): 367–375. doi:10.1104/pp.15.3.367. PMC 437838. PMID 16653641.
- Day, Dorothy; Hervey, Annette H. (April 1946). "Phycomyces in the Assay of Thiamine in Agar". Plant Physiology. 21 (2): 233–236. doi:10.1104/pp.21.2.233. JSTOR 4257940. PMC 437270. PMID 16654039.

== Bibliography ==
- Bailey, Martha J., ed. (1994), "Day, Dorothy", American Women in Science: A Biographical Dictionary, Denver, CO: ABC-CLIO, pp. 81–82, ISBN 978-0-87436-740-9
