= Alex Poon =

American transgender advocate

- Born: 1992 (age 33–34)
- Education: Wellesley College, 2014
- Known for: transgender advocacy

Alex Poon is an American transgender advocate.

== Education and background ==
Poon graduated from Wellesley College (a women's college) in 2014, where he majored in computer science. He came out as transgender as a sophomore. He was the first out transgender person to win the annual hoop rolling race since it began in 1895. His mother, Helen Poon, also won when she was a senior at Wellesley in 1982.

Poon is Chinese-American and grew up in Virginia. He attended Holton-Arms School, an all-girls high school, where he was captain of the girls' swim team and the men's water polo team at a local all-boys school.

== Career and advocacy ==
Poon has been interviewed for news stories about transgender students, including trans women and non-binary people, at women's colleges.

Poon works as a product manager at a technology company and does occasional public speaking and interviews about gender in the workplace. He talks about having been perceived as both a man and a woman in the workplace, giving him a unique perspective on discrimination and sexism. In 2019, he said that his work at IBM was undervalued before he transitioned to male, but afterwards, he was given "a seat at the table". He told The Washington Post that after his transition, "People now assume I have logic, advice and seniority. They look at me and assume I know the answer, even when I don't. I've been in meetings where everyone else in the room was a woman and more senior, yet I still got asked, 'Alex, what do you think? We thought you would know.'"
