= Yukiko Maki =

Japanese educator

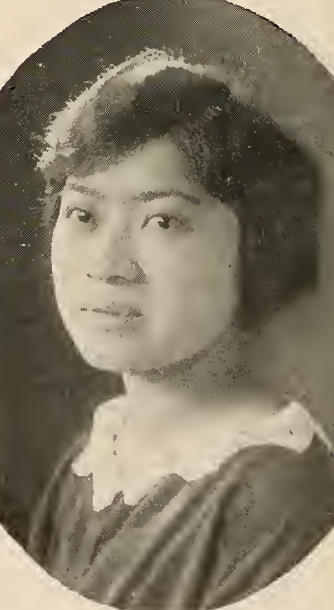
- Yuki Domoto, from the 1924 yearbook of Wellesley College
- Born: Yukiko Domoto; 1902; Oakland, California, US
- Died: October 18, 1989 (aged 86–87); Japan
- Occupation: Educator

Yukiko Maki (1902 – October 18, 1989), born Yukiko Domoto, was a Japanese educator. In 1976 she was awarded the Order of the Sacred Treasure, Fourth Class, for her work in international exchange.

== Early life ==
Yukiko Domoto was from Oakland, California, the daughter of Takanoshin (Frank) Domoto and Matsue (Uno) Domoto. Her uncles ran the Domoto Brothers Nursery in Oakland. She spent some of her childhood in Japan, attended a preparatory school in New Jersey, and graduated from Wellesley College in 1924. While a student, she participated in dance shows in Massachusetts and with the Japanese YWCA in Oakland; she designed costumes and directed some productions.

== Career ==
Maki, widowed in 1941, taught English at Tsuda College from the 1940s until her retirement in 1972. In the aftermath of World War II, she used her language skills to start the Japan-America Women's Club, for English-speaking Japanese women to meet with the wives of American occupation officials. She co-founded the American College Women’s Association of Japan, which created scholarships for Japanese women to study in the United States. She was a program officer for the Fulbright Commission. She accompanied Japanese women on exchange programs to the United States, as vice-president of the Japan International Living Experience Association.

In 1979, she became the first Japanese woman to receive the Wellesley Alumnae Achievement Award. In 1976 she was awarded the Order of the Sacred Treasure, Fourth Class, for her work in international exchange. In 1989, she spoke on "Education for Women in Japan" to a Wellesley College tour group in Japan.

== Personal life ==
Yuki Domoto married diplomat Kaoru Maki in 1927 and lived in Washington, D.C. while he was based there; he died from tuberculosis in 1941. They had a son, Takashi. She married again, to Goichi Takeuchi, before 1958. She died in 1989, aged 87 years.
