= Charlotte Fitch Roberts =

American chemist

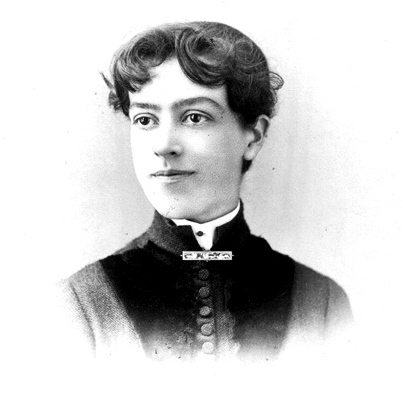
- Born: February 13, 1859; New York City
- Died: December 5, 1917 (aged 58); Wellesley, Massachusetts, USA
- Education: Yale
- Occupation: Professor of chemistry

Charlotte Fitch Roberts (February 13, 1859 – December 5, 1917) was an American chemist best known for her work on stereochemistry.

== Life ==
Roberts was born on February 13, 1859, in New York City to Horace Roberts and Mary Roberts (née Hart). She was raised in Greenfield, Massachusetts. During a time when few women pursued higher education, Roberts demonstrated an early interest in science, which would later lead her to study chemistry and contribute to the field of stereochemistry.

== Education and career ==
Roberts attended Wellesley College in 1880. During her time at Wellesley College, she was a graduate assistant (1881), an instructor (1882), and eventually an associate professor (1886). In 1885 she spent a year at Cambridge University working with Sir James Dewar, a chemist and physicist. Roberts also obtained a PhD from Yale in 1894 and a post at the University of Berlin from 1899 to 1900. In 1896 she published The Development and Present Aspects of Stereochemistry. Her Yale professor claimed that The Development and Present Aspects of Stereochemistry was "the clearest exposition of which we have knowledge of the principles and conditions of stereochemistry." Roberts' PhD, in the field of chemistry, is historically notable for being the first in that particular field awarded to a female Yale student. She was made a professor and the head of the chemistry department from 1896 to 1917 at Wellesley College.

== Awards and professional bodies ==
Roberts was made a fellow of the American Association for the Advancement of Science, and a chemistry professorship at Wellesley now bears her name. Furthermore, there is an award in her honor for those who have a positive influence on the Chemistry Department at Wellesley.
