= Helen Abbot Merrill =

American mathematician (1864-1949)

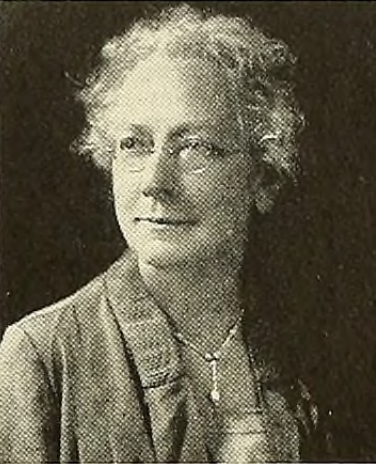
- Helen Abbot Merrill, from the 1929 yearbook of Wellesley College
- Born: March 30, 1864; Llewellyn Park, Orange, New Jersey, U.S.
- Died: May 1, 1949 (age 85); Wellesley, Massachusetts, U.S.
- Scientific career
- Thesis: On Solutions of Differential Equations Which Possess an Oscillatoin Theorem (1903)

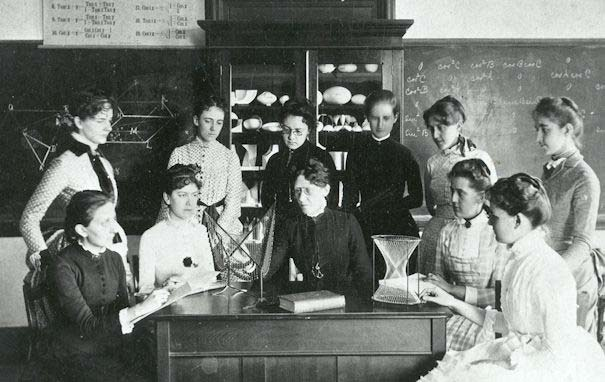
Helen Abbott Merrill with math students at Wellesley College

Helen Abbot Merrill (March 30, 1864 – May 1, 1949) was an American mathematician, educator and textbook author. She was chair of the mathematics department at Wellesley College, where she taught from 1893 to 1932.

== Early life and education ==
Merrill was born on March 30, 1864, in Llewellyn Park, New Jersey. Her father George Merrill was a New Jersey insurance claims adjuster; her mother was Emily Dodge Abbot Merrill. She lived in Newburyport, Massachusetts, for some of her childhood. She entered Wellesley College in 1882; she intended to major in Greek and Latin, but switched to mathematics after one year, and graduated in 1886. She pursued further studies at the University of Chicago and in Germany. In 1903 she earned a PhD in mathematics at Yale University under the direction of James Pierpont. Her thesis was "On Solutions of Differential Equations which possess an Oscillation Theorem."

Her younger brother William P. Merrill was a noted Presbyterian minister, hymn writer, and pacifist.

== Career ==
Merrill taught at girls' schools in New York and Pennsylvania after college. She taught mathematics at Wellesley College beginning in 1893, and she was chair of the mathematics department from 1916 to 1932. She rebuilt Wellesley's collection of cardboard mathematical models, after a fire destroyed the original set. Upon her retirement in 1932 from Wellesley, she was given the title professor emerita.

She became a fellow of the American Association for the Advancement of Science in 1911. In 1920 she was appointed vice-president of the Mathematical Association of America.

== Publications ==
Merrill wrote two textbooks with her Wellesley colleague Clara Eliza Smith: Selected Topics in Higher Algebra (Norwood, 1914) and A First Course in Higher Algebra (Macmillan, 1917). She also wrote a book titled Mathematical Excursions in 1933, meant to explain some mathematical concepts to a young audience.

== Personal life ==
Merrill died in 1949, at the age of 85, in Wellesley, Massachusetts.

== See also ==
- Sturm–Liouville theory
