= Tundi Spring Agardy =

American conservationist

Tundi Agardy
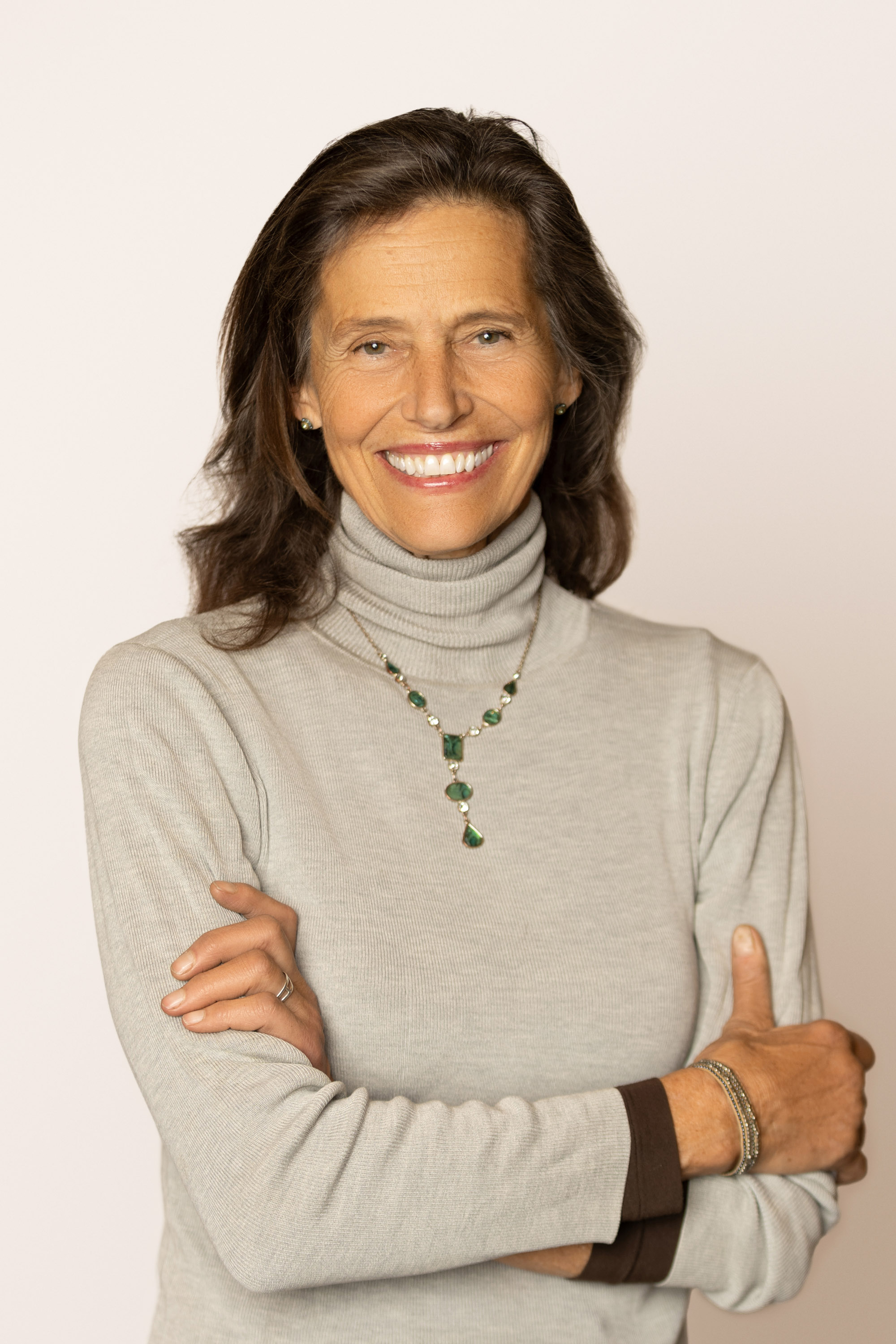
- Agardy in 2024
- Born: May 10, 1957; New Jersey, USA
- Education: Wellesley College; Dartmouth College; University of Rhode Island
- Known for: Bridging the worlds of marine science, conservation, and policy
- Scientific career
- Fields: Marine ecology and conservation

Tundi Spring Agardy (born May 10, 1957) is a marine conservationist and the founder of Sound Seas – a Washington DC–based group specializing in working at the nexus of marine science and policy in order to safeguard ocean life.

== Education and inspiration ==
Hungarian by descent, Tundi Agardy was born in the United States after her parents and sister fled Hungary. She had the good fortune of being selected to participate in a high school expedition to the U.S. Virgin Islands to learn about field biology, and there cemented her desire to focus on the sea and the challenges to preserving its wonders. After studying at Wellesley and Dartmouth Colleges in New England (USA), she returned to the Virgin Islands to lead an endangered species management program in cooperation with the US Fish and Wildlife Service. Years later she returned to graduate school at the University of Rhode Island, where she simultaneously worked towards her https://web.uri.edu/maf Master of Marine Affairs] (specializing in fisheries management) and her Ph.D. in Biological Sciences (sea turtle population dynamics and genetics). While at URI she joined the nascent Coastal Resources Center, exporting US experience in coastal planning to developing countries. Tundi then went on to do a post-doc at the Woods Hole Oceanographic Institution (WHOI), and was a Marine Policy Fellow there for several years. It was while at WHOI that she began working with the multilateral institutions that would shape her interests and work in years to come: the Man and Biosphere Reserve Programme of UNESCO and the International Union for the Conservation of Nature and Natural Resources (IUCN). The love of the sea that her husband Josh Spring and children Alex, Sophie, and Christopher all share is a continuing source of inspiration.

== Environmental NGO work ==
In 1990, Tundi moved to Washington to work as Senior Scientist for World Wildlife Fund (WWF). At the time there was no formal marine program, but country programs were encouraged to do more in the marine conservation realm, and Agardy assisted in priority-setting, project design, and project execution, working in Africa, Asia, the Caribbean and Central America, and Europe. As much of this work centered on marine protected areas, she used the wealth of knowledge acquired in her experiences to write the acclaimed book "Marine Protected Areas and Ocean Conservation". During this time, Tundi also worked closely with IUCN field and headquarters programs, and chaired the Marine Advisory Group that guided the Union's marine conversation activities over multiple triennia. She later joined Conservation International to launch CI's Global Marine Program, and shortly thereafter founded Sound Seas, looking for ways to interface between the scientific community, the international policy arena, and the NGO and multilateral institutions relying on scientific information and policy frameworks in order to achieve effective marine conservation.

== Conservation needs assessment and evaluation ==
Sound Seas began with small teams addressing the needs of philanthropic foundations to conduct evaluations and undertake strategic planning. Through Sound Seas Tundi conducted a strategic evaluation of the John D. and Catherine T. MacArthur Foundation's Population, Consumption, and Environment Program, and assisted the Oak Foundation in its early efforts to support marine protected area initiatives worldwide. Agardy worked with colleagues to design the Coral Reef Targeted Research Project of the World Bank, and prepared a feasibility study for the institutional arrangement that supported it. Sound Seas explored the feasibility of establishing a research station on Palmyra Atoll for The Nature Conservancy, and conducted evaluations for the United Nations Development Programme in the Black Sea region, for its support of WWF climate change work in Cameroon, Fiji, and Tanzania, and International Financial Corporation in its support of The Nature Conservancy's work in Komodo, Indonesia. She then worked with the United Nations Development Programme's Mediterranean Action Programme, coordinating an initial assessment of the Mediterranean Sea to promote the Ecosystem Approach in the region. This built on the work she has done in marine protected areas, targeted marine research, and identification of ecologically important areas, in Italian waters and in the Mediterranean as a whole. Subsequent contracts with the Regional Activity Center for Specially Protected Areas under the MAP focused on evaluations of SPAMIs, work on guidelines for Other Effective Area-Based Conservation Measures (OECM), assessing the feasibility of marine protected areas in offshore areas, and other marine conservation issues in the Med. Tundi also worked with Giuseppe Notarbartolo di Sciara to investigate the feasibility and provide design options for bilateral or trilateral protected areas in the Strait of Sicily. In 2001, shortly after founding Sound Seas, Tundi began brainstorming with colleagues from the World Resources Institute about how to recognize the value of natural ecosystems for humanity. This led to her involvement with the Millennium Ecosystem Assessment (MEA), which in 2005 published the first global evaluation of the status of ecosystems in relation to human well-being. Tundi headed the coastal portion of this comprehensive assessment, and was co-author of the summary document "Ecosystems and Human Well-Being: Biodiversity Synthesis".

== Coastal and marine management and training ==
Building on experiences gained in promoting marine protected areas, policies aimed at marine biodiversity conservation, and integrated coastal and marine planning, Tundi published several books that continue to provide guidance for marine managers today. A co-authored publication entitled "Biodiversity in the Seas" has been credited as spurring many marine conservation activities that followed the adoption of the Jakarta Mandate of the Convention on Biological Diversity, focusing world attention on the value and status of life in the seas. She participated in a National Academy of Sciences committee on capacity building for coastal management that produced a useful book on the topic. Her books on marine protected areas, her scientific papers on science and information needs in planning, and her many publications on integrated or ecosystem-based marine management have helped to add rigor to the field of marine conservation. "Ocean Zoning: Making Marine Management More Effective" explores the tool of zoning in Marine Spatial Planning and integrated management more generally. Working through the Center for Biodiversity at the American Museum of Natural History, Sound Seas created several teaching modules on marine conservation biology, international treaties, and marine protected areas. Her 2011 the United Nations Development Programme publication describes the core principles behind EBM and outlines steps to achieve it, and has served as the basis for training and capacity building in various regions around the world, including in the Mediterranean Sea (through the Barcelona Convention and its Mediterranean Action Programme) and the Red Sea region (PERSGA). Tundi has also designed site-specific trainings, including conducting training for MSP in Greece, centering on the region around Gyaros - a critically important monk seal habitat that has subsequently been protected as a marine park.

== Marine ecosystem services and markets ==
Recognizing the inadequate resource base that exists for doing marine management effectively around the world, Agardy joined Forest Trends in 2006 to explore innovative financing for marine conservation. Tundi launched the Marine Ecosystem Services (MARES) Program at Forest Trends (FT) in 2004. Building on the immense catalytic work being done by FT in forest-based payments for ecosystem services and water quality trading, the MARES Program supported innovative financing for coastal and marine conservation. MARES advanced knowledge on assessing the value of coastal and marine habitats for the myriad ecosystem services they provide, and identifying opportunities for Payments for Ecosystem Services (PES), offsets, or other market-like mechanisms to generate revenues that support conservation (and, very often, local communities that provide stewardship). Working in tandem with IUCN and other groups, MARES also advanced the Blue Carbon agenda. Even after leaving FT in 2016, Tundi continued to stay involved, participating with FT in the Global Nature Positive Summit (Sydney, 2024), publishing the State of the Blue Carbon Markets report for Ecosystem Marketplace just prior. Tundi was named a Forest Trends Fellow in 2023. In related work, Tundi co-authored a paper with Marcello Hernandez, Robert Costanza, and others about establishing an Ocean Trust, which has expanded the dialogue on financing conservation of marine habitats and species.

== Special ocean areas ==
Tundi was one of the pioneers in marine protected areas, working with early champions like Richard Kenchington, Graeme Kelleher, and Rod Salm. Her many publications on marine protected areas and network design include a 1994 paper in Trends in Ecology and Evolution. and the previously mentioned book "Marine Protected Areas and Ocean Conservation". She has provided guidance on coastal and marine biosphere reserves as well, including IUCN Guidelines for Coastal Biosphere Reserves, and she remains a strong advocate for the biosphere reserve model.

As countries began making commitments under the Convention on Biological Diversity to reach areal targets for protected areas, a realization that spatial management could protect biodiversity beyond protected areas led to designation of Other Effective Area-based Conservation Measures (OECM). Tundi participated in the early IUCN Task Force defining OECM and providing guidance on operationalizing criteria, and in 2022 she began working with FAO on how OECM could be promoted through fisheries management. Vera Agostini, Deputy Director of Fisheries for FAO, contracted Tundi and Imen Meliane to work with FAO's Amber Himes-Cornell to write a handbook on identifying, evaluating and reporting fisheries OECM. Tundi subsequently published a companion document providing guidance on evidencing biodiversity outcomes in fisheries OECM.

Through her role advising the International Conference on Marine Mammal Protected Areas, Tundi began working with marine mammalogists on identifying key areas for marine mammals around the world, known as IMMAs. While these IMMAs are based on ecological data and do not consider management need, the designation of an area as an IMMA can spur conservation and management, including establishment of new protected areas or OECM. Tundi has published on establishing early warning systems for IMMAs under threat, and has worked on the implications of climate change for IMMAs.

== Restoration ==
Given the continuing degradation of the ocean environment, the turn of the millennium brought the recognition that conservation that protected the status quo was never going to be enough to allow damaged coastal and marine ecosystems to regain their biodiversity, productivity, and resilience. Marine restoration science and practice thus accelerated, decades behind terrestrial restoration. In 2017, Tundi was invited to participate in an oversight and selection panel (OSP) for the Cambridge Conservation Initiative's Endangered Landscapes Program, funding large-scale restoration projects in Europe. The Program received so many marine restoration proposals that it subsequently split into separate Landscapes and Seascapes funding streams, and Tundi then chaired the Seascapes OSP. In addition to directing funding to marine restoration, Tundi was involved with providing guidance for restoration projects around the world and especially in the Caribbean and Mediterranean, assessing success factors in seascape scale restoration. This then led to collaboration with Lisa Wedding of University of Oxford, with the two editing a special collection of the Nature journal Ocean Sustainability on 'ecoscape' restoration – large scale restoration across multiple ecosystems, often spanning land, freshwater, and sea. Collaboration with Catarina Frazao-Santos explored how climate-smart MSP could guide ecoscape restoration more effectively.

Since 1997 Tundi has worked with a leading coastal engineering firm headquartered in Canada – Baird & Associates. Through the planning, design, and restoration activities in dozens of Baird projects around the world, Tundi has been able to successfully straddle the conservation and coastal development worlds, to show how engineered solutions to coastal problems can promote long term ecosystem recovery.

== Communication and teaching ==
Tundi Agardy was Science and Policy Director at the World Ocean Observatory and writes provocative articles on ocean issues for the organization's World Ocean Forum (e.g.), and continues her work with World Ocean Observatory by chairing the Board of Directors. She was also Contributing Editor of MEAM (Marine Ecosystems and Management) – a publication on ecosystem-based management produced in association with the University of Washington (United States)., also producing for many years the monthly column "Tundi's Take" which explored emerging issues in marine management.

Although not an academic, Tundi has expressed that teaching is the most fulfilling endeavor in her life. Tundi has participated in teaching several rounds of the Erasmus Mundus Masters in MSP, has lectured at universities and schools around the world, and has advised graduate students in marine management, coastal engineering, conservation, and fisheries.

== Awards and honorary positions ==
Tundi serves on the Board of Trustees of the Living Oceans Society (Canada) and is Chairman of the Board of the World Ocean Observatory (US). Tundi sits on numerous international advisory bodies, including the [{Water Revolution Foundation}], MedPAN (Mediterranean Marine Protected Areas Network), Global Ocean Forum, the Baird Innovation Fund, and the Endangered Landscapes and Seascapes Program, which she chairs. She formerly served two terms on the US Federal Advisory Committee on Marine Protected Areas and advised dozens of other initiatives. The URI Alumni Association granted Tundi the Award for Excellence in Research in 1996, and in the previous year she was selected by TIME Magazine as one of the fifty most promising young leaders in America. She was given the Civic Scientist of the Year Award by the Earthwatch Foundation in 1998, and the Secretary of State Open Forum Distinguished Public Service Award in the same year. In 2006, Tundi was selected to receive the University of Miami’s Rosenstiel Award for Significant Achievement in Oceanography and Marine Policy. In 2024, Tundi was awarded Distinguished Visiting Fellow at Worcester College, University of Oxford; her collaborations with Oxford researchers are ongoing.
