= Jennifer Maestre =

American artist (born 1959)

- Born: 1959 (age 66–67); Johannesburg, South Africa
- Education: Wellesley College; Massachusetts College of Art
- Known for: pencil sculptures
- Website: http://www.jennifermaestre.com

Jennifer Maestre (born 1959 in Johannesburg, South Africa) is a Massachusetts-based artist. She is best known for her pencil sculptures.

Maestre was originally inspired by the form and function of the sea urchin. In her artist statement, she writes: "The spines of the urchin, so dangerous yet beautiful, serve as an explicit warning against contact. The alluring texture of the spines draws the touch in spite of the possible consequences. The tension unveiled, we feel push and pull, desire and repulsion. The sections of pencils present aspects of sharp and smooth for two very different textural and aesthetic experiences...There is true a fragility to the sometimes brutal aspect of the sculptures, vulnerability that is belied by the fearsome texture."

Maestre uses a variety pencils, nails and stitching to make the sculptures. She takes hundreds of pencils, cuts them into small 1-inch sections, drills a hole in each section, sharpens them all and sews them together.

Her work is in the permanent collections of the New Britain Museum of American Art. the Krannert Art Museum, and the DeCordova Museum and Sculpture Park.
