= Judy Brown (physicist) =

American physicist

- Born: Teague, Texas
- Education: Rice University; University of California, Berkeley
- Known for: Constant-Q transform
- Awards: Fellow of the Acoustical Society of America (1999)
- Scientific career
- Fields: Physics; Signal processing Bioacoustics
- Workplaces: Centre d'Etudes Nucleaires de Saclay; Wellesley College; MIT

Judith "Judy" C. Brown is an American physicist and professor emerita at Wellesley College. She was a visiting scientist at the MIT Media Lab in the Machine Listening Group for over 20 years, and is recognized for her contributions in music information retrieval, including developing the constant-Q transform. She is a Fellow of the Acoustical Society of America (ASA) and has served on the ASA technical committees for musical acoustics and animal bioacoustics.

== Biography ==
Brown was born in Teague, Texas, and attended Rice University for her bachelor's degree in chemistry. She attended the University of California, Berkeley, for her PhD and then spent three years as a postdoctoral fellow in solid state physics at the Centre d'Etudes Nucleaires de Saclay. She then joined the faculty in the physics department at Wellesley College, where she taught the first quantum mechanics course at Wellesley. She joined the MIT Media Lab as a visiting scientist in 1986 to conduct research on computer perception of music and developed classification algorithms for marine mammal sounds. She was elected a Fellow of the Acoustical Society of America in 1999 for her contributions in applying signal processing to musical acoustics, frequency tracking, instrument identification, and spectral analysis. She retired in 2005.
