= List of courts of the United States =

The courts of the United States are closely linked hierarchical systems of courts at the federal and state levels. The federal courts form the judicial branch of the U.S. government and operate under the authority of the United States Constitution and federal law. The state and territorial courts of the individual U.S. states and territories operate under the authority of the state and territorial constitutions and state and territorial law.

Federal statutes that refer to the "courts of the United States" are referring only to the courts of the federal government, and not the courts of the individual states and counties. Because of the federalist underpinnings of the division between sovereign federal and state governments, the various state court systems are free to operate in ways that vary widely from those of the federal government, and from one another. In practice, however, every state has adopted a division of its judiciary into at least two levels, and almost every state has three levels, with trial courts hearing cases which may be reviewed by appellate courts, and finally by a state supreme court. A few states have two separate supreme courts, with one having authority over civil matters and the other reviewing criminal cases. 47 states and the federal government allow at least one appeal of right from a final judgment on the merits, meaning that the court receiving the appeal must decide the appeal after it is briefed and argued properly. Three states do not provide a right to a first appeal. Rather, they give litigants only a right to petition for the right to have an appeal heard.

State courts often have diverse names and structures, as illustrated below. State courts hear about 98% of litigation; most states have courts of special jurisdiction, which typically handle minor disputes such as traffic citations, and courts of general jurisdiction responsible for more serious disputes.

The U.S. federal court system hears cases involving litigants from two or more states, violations of federal laws, treaties, and the Constitution, admiralty, bankruptcy, and related issues. In practice, about 80% of the cases are civil and 20% criminal. The civil cases often involve civil rights, patents, and Social Security while the criminal cases involve tax fraud, robbery, counterfeiting, and drug crimes. The trial courts are U.S. district courts, followed by United States courts of appeals and then the Supreme Court of the United States. The judicial system, whether state or federal, begins with a court of first instance, whose work may be reviewed by an appellate court, and then ends at the court of last resort, which may review the work of the lower courts.

Institutions which may be considered courts of the United States are listed below.

== United States Federal Courts ==
The geographical boundary of the 12 United States Courts of Appeals

=== Geographic based jurisdiction ===
- Trial Courts: United States district courts (see federal court sections by state below for specific district courts)
  - List of United States district and territorial courts (94 courts, also listed by state below)
- Appellate Courts: United States courts of appeals
  - United States Court of Appeals for the First Circuit
  - United States Court of Appeals for the Second Circuit
  - United States Court of Appeals for the Third Circuit
  - United States Court of Appeals for the Fourth Circuit
  - United States Court of Appeals for the Fifth Circuit
  - United States Court of Appeals for the Sixth Circuit
  - United States Court of Appeals for the Seventh Circuit
  - United States Court of Appeals for the Eighth Circuit
  - United States Court of Appeals for the Ninth Circuit
  - United States Court of Appeals for the Tenth Circuit
  - United States Court of Appeals for the Eleventh Circuit
  - United States Court of Appeals for the District of Columbia Circuit
- Court of last resort:
  - Supreme Court of the United States

=== Specific subject-matter jurisdiction ===
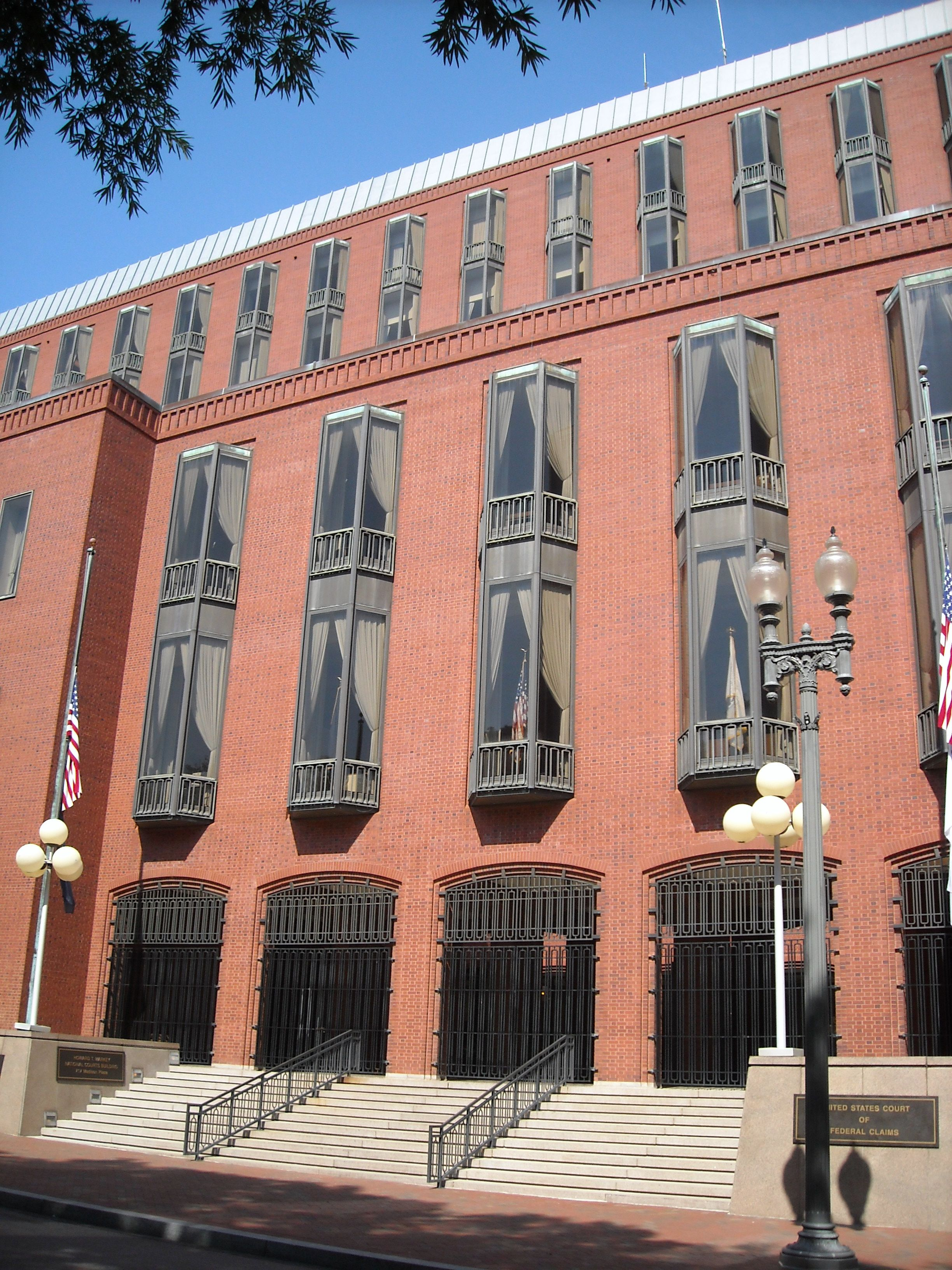
Headquarters of the U.S. Court of Federal Claims on Madison Place in Washington, D.C.

- United States federal courts with Original Jurisdiction over specific subject matter:
  - United States Tax Court
  - Patent Trial and Appeal Board
  - International Trade Commission
  - United States Court of International Trade
  - United States Court of Federal Claims
  - United States Foreign Intelligence Surveillance Court
  - United States bankruptcy courts
  - Trademark Trial and Appeal Board
  - United States Merit Systems Protection Board
  - United States Alien Terrorist Removal Court
- Courts with Appellate Jurisdiction over specific subject matter:
  - United States Court of Appeals for the Federal Circuit
  - United States Court of Appeals for the Armed Forces
    - United States Army Court of Criminal Appeals
    - Navy-Marine Corps Court of Criminal Appeals
    - Air Force Court of Criminal Appeals
    - Coast Guard Court of Criminal Appeals
  - United States Court of Appeals for Veterans Claims
  - United States Foreign Intelligence Surveillance Court of Review
  - United States Court of Military Commission Review
  - Civilian Board of Contract Appeals
  - Armed Services Board of Contract Appeals
  - Postal Service Board of Contract Appeals
  - Office of Dispute Resolution for Acquisition
  - Board of Immigration Appeals
  - Board of Veterans' Appeals

=== Former United States Courts ===
- Board of Patent Appeals and Interferences (before 2012)
- Court of Appeals in Cases of Capture (1780–1789)
- Temporary Emergency Court of Appeals (1971–1992)
- United States circuit courts (1789–1911)
- United States Commerce Court (1910–1913)
- United States Court of Customs and Patent Appeals (1909–1982)
- United States Court of Private Land Claims (1891–1904)
- United States Court for Berlin (1955–1990)
- United States District Court for the Canal Zone (1914–1982)
- United States Court for China (1906–1943)

== Courts by state of the United States ==
- State supreme courts
  - State court (United States)

=== Alabama ===
State courts of Alabama

- Supreme Court of Alabama
  - Alabama Court of Civil Appeals
  - Alabama Court of Criminal Appeals
    - Alabama Circuit Courts (41 circuits)
      - Alabama District Courts (67 districts)
      - Alabama Municipal Courts (273 courts)
      - Alabama Probate Courts (68 courts)
  - Alabama Court of the Judiciary

Federal courts located in Alabama

- United States District Court for the Northern District of Alabama
- United States District Court for the Middle District of Alabama
- United States District Court for the Southern District of Alabama

(All United States District Courts in Alabama may be appealed to the United States Court of Appeals for the Eleventh Circuit, headquartered in Atlanta, Georgia)

Former federal courts of Alabama

- United States District Court for the District of Alabama (extinct, subdivided in 1824)

=== Alaska ===
State courts of Alaska

- Alaska Supreme Court
  - Alaska Court of Appeals
    - Alaska Superior Court (4 districts containing 40 judgeships)
      - Alaska District Court (21 judgeships)

Federal courts located in Alaska

- United States District Court for the District of Alaska

=== Arizona ===
State courts of Arizona

- Arizona Supreme Court
  - Arizona Court of Appeals (2 divisions)
    - Superior Court of Arizona (15 counties)
      - Justices of the Peace (county courts) and Arizona Municipal Courts, city trial courts and courts of limited jurisdiction

Federal courts located in Arizona

- United States District Court for the District of Arizona

=== Arkansas ===
State courts of Arkansas

- Arkansas Supreme Court
  - Arkansas Court of Appeals
    - Arkansas Circuit Courts (28 judicial circuits)
      - Arkansas District Courts
        - Arkansas State District Courts (32 state judicial districts)
        - Arkansas Local District Courts (35 local district courts)
      - Arkansas County Courts (75 counties)

Federal courts located in Arkansas

- United States District Court for the Eastern District of Arkansas
- United States District Court for the Western District of Arkansas
- United States Bankruptcy Court for the Eastern and Western Districts of Arkansas

Former federal courts of Arkansas

- United States District Court for the District of Arkansas (extinct, subdivided)

=== California ===
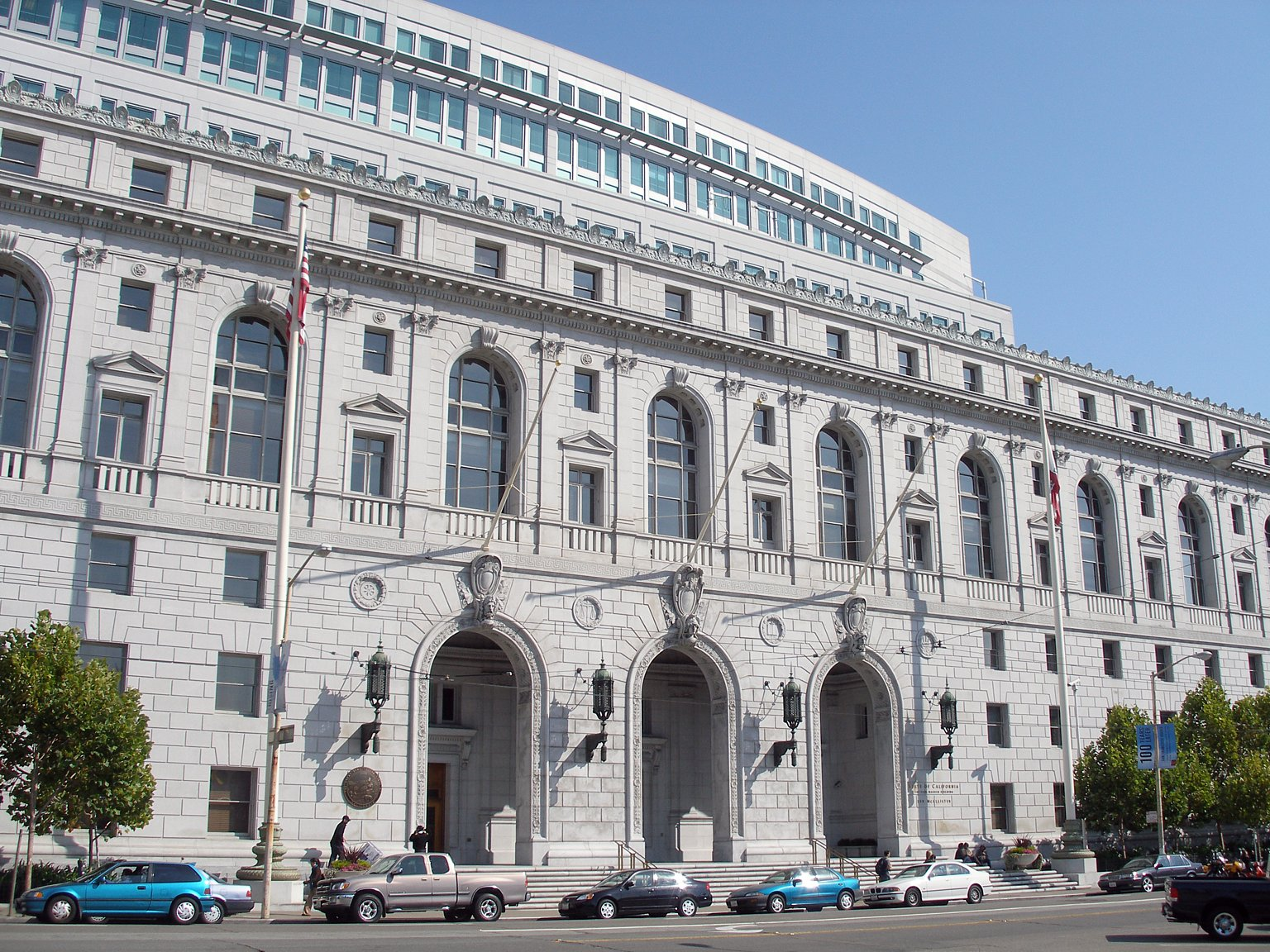
Headquarters of the Supreme Court of California, in San Francisco.

State courts of record of California

- Supreme Court of California
  - California Courts of Appeal (6 appellate districts)
    - Superior Courts of California (58 courts, one for each county)

State quasi-administrative courts of California

- State Bar Court of California; an administrative court within the judicial branch, subordinate to the California Supreme Court

Federal courts located in California

- United States Court of Appeals for the Ninth Circuit (headquartered in San Francisco, having jurisdiction over the United States District Courts of Alaska, Arizona, California, Guam, Hawaii, Idaho, Montana, Nevada, the Northern Mariana Islands, Oregon, and Washington)
  - United States District Court for the Central District of California
  - United States District Court for the Eastern District of California
  - United States District Court for the Northern District of California
  - United States District Court for the Southern District of California

Former federal courts of California

- United States District Court for the District of California (extinct, subdivided)

=== Colorado ===
State courts of Colorado

- Colorado Supreme Court
  - Colorado Court of Appeals
    - Colorado District Courts (22 judicial districts)
      - Colorado County Courts

Federal courts located in Colorado

- United States Court of Appeals for the Tenth Circuit (headquartered in Denver, having jurisdiction over the United States District Courts of Colorado, Kansas, New Mexico, Oklahoma, Utah, and Wyoming)
  - United States District Court for the District of Colorado

=== Connecticut ===
State courts of Connecticut

- Connecticut Supreme Court
  - Connecticut Appellate Court
    - Connecticut Superior Court (13 districts)
    - Connecticut Probate Courts (54 districts)

Federal court located in Connecticut:

- United States District Court for the District of Connecticut

=== Delaware ===
State courts of Delaware

- Delaware Supreme Court
  - Delaware Court of Chancery
  - Delaware Superior Court (3 courts, one for each county)
    - Delaware Family Court
    - Delaware Court of Common Pleas
    - Delaware Justice of the Peace Court
    - Delaware Alderman's Court

Federal courts located in Delaware

- United States District Court for the District of Delaware

=== Florida ===
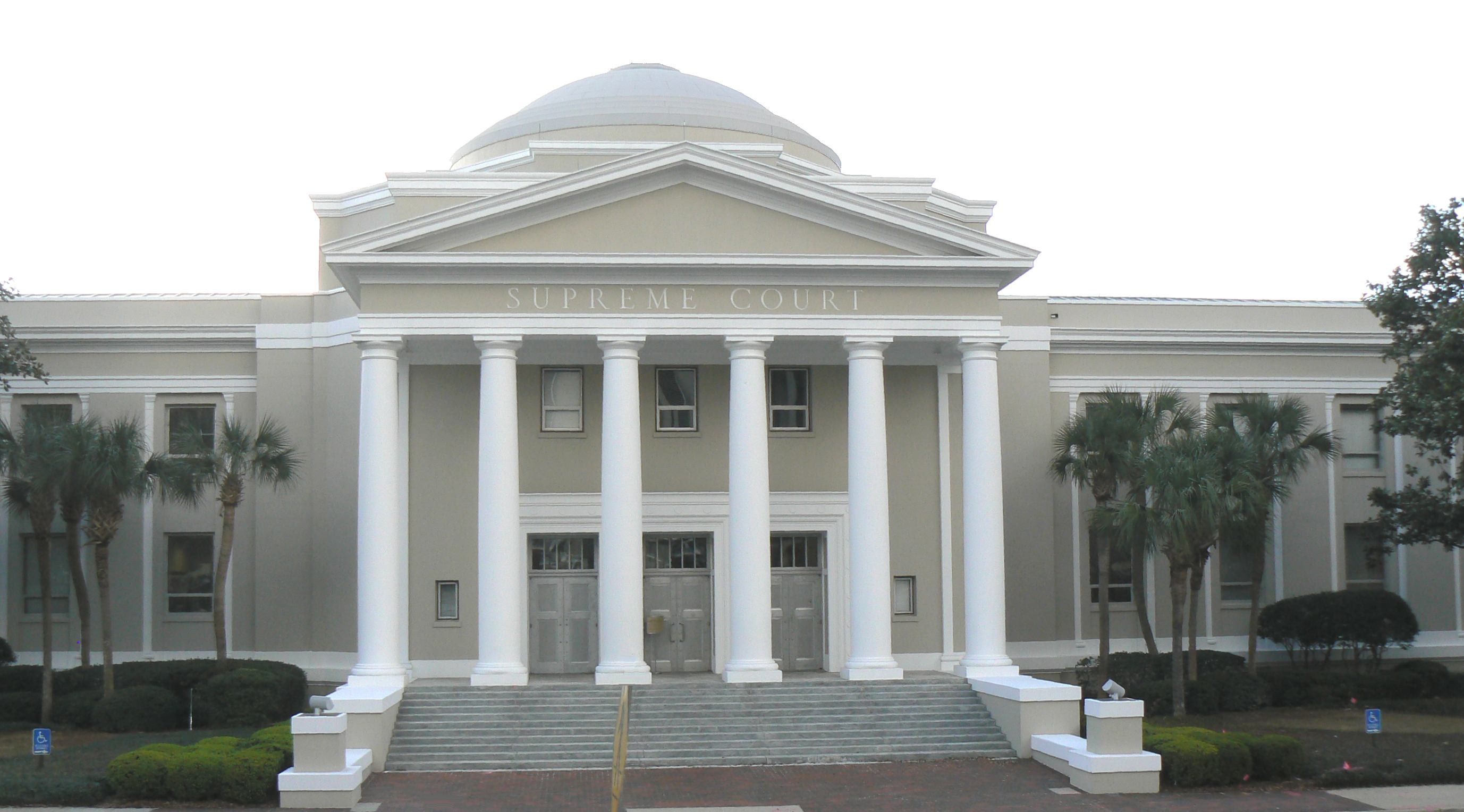
Headquarters of the Florida Supreme Court in Tallahassee.

State courts of Florida

- Florida Supreme Court
  - District courts of appeal (6 districts)
    - Circuit courts (20 judicial circuits)
      - County courts (67 courts, one for each county)

Federal courts located in Florida

- United States District Court for the Northern District of Florida
- United States District Court for the Middle District of Florida
- United States District Court for the Southern District of Florida

Former federal courts of Florida

- United States District Court for the District of Florida (extinct, subdivided)

=== Georgia ===
State courts of Georgia

- Supreme Court of Georgia
  - Georgia Court of Appeals
    - Georgia Superior Courts (49 judicial circuits)
    - Georgia State-wide Business Court
      - Georgia State Courts
        - Georgia Magistrate Courts
        - Georgia Juvenile Courts
        - Georgia Probate Courts
        - Georgia Municipal Courts

Federal courts located in Georgia

- United States Court of Appeals for the Eleventh Circuit (headquartered in Atlanta, having jurisdiction over the United States District Courts of Alabama, Florida, and Georgia)
- United States District Court for the Northern District of Georgia
- United States District Court for the Middle District of Georgia
- United States District Court for the Southern District of Georgia

Former federal courts of Georgia

- United States District Court for the District of Georgia (extinct, subdivided)

=== Hawaii ===
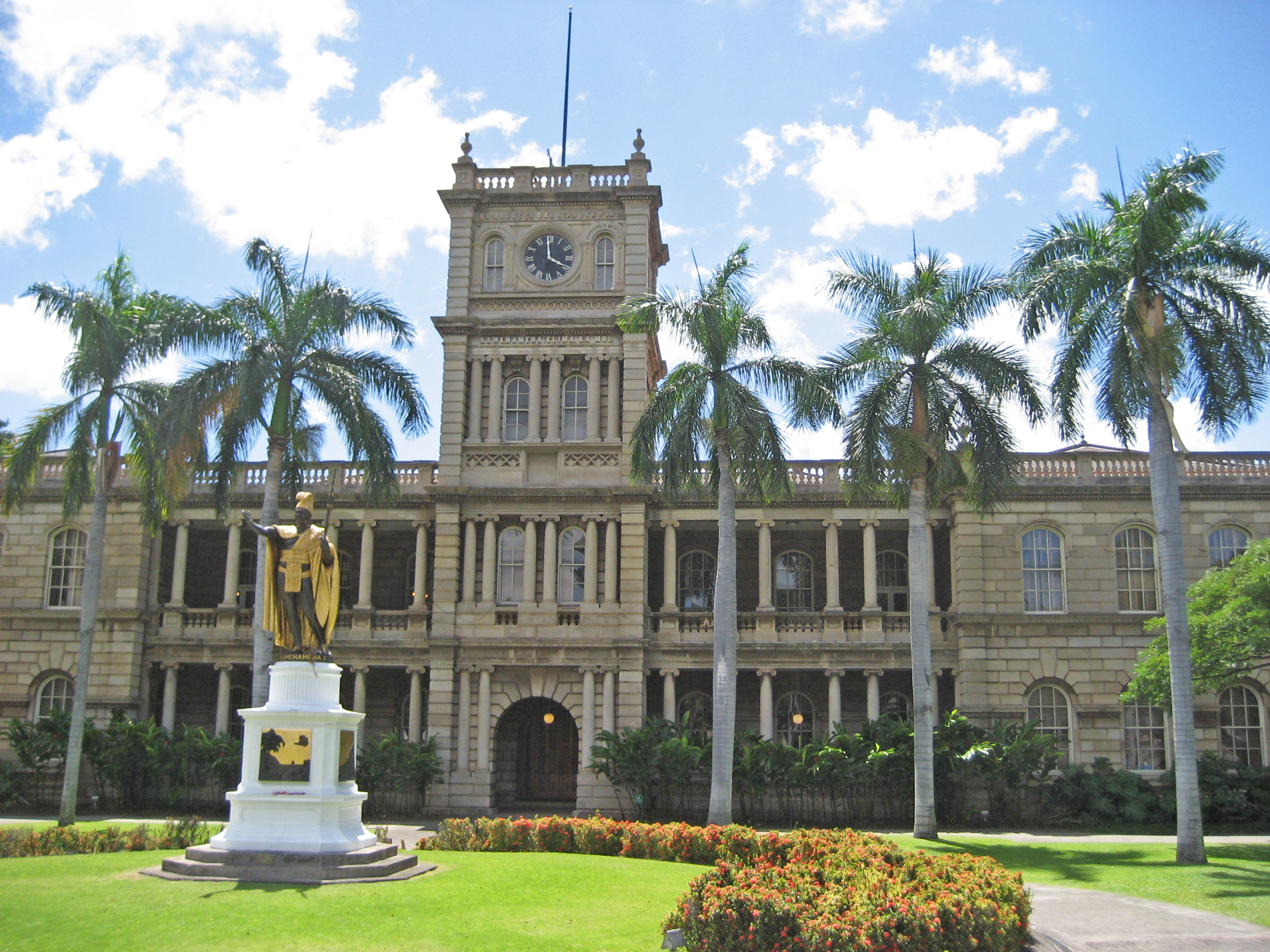
Aliʻiōlani Hale, in Honolulu, the building where the Hawaiʻi State Supreme Court meets

State courts of Hawaii

- Hawaiʻi State Supreme Court
  - Hawaii Intermediate Court of Appeals
    - Hawaii state circuit courts (4 circuits)
    - Hawaii State family courts (4 circuits)
    - Hawaii state district courts (including Small Claims Court)
    - Hawaiʻi State Land Court
    - Hawaii Tax Appeal Court

Federal courts located in Hawaii

- United States District Court for the District of Hawaii

=== Idaho ===
State courts of Idaho

- Idaho Supreme Court
  - Idaho Court of Appeals
    - Idaho District Courts (7 judicial districts)
      - Idaho Drug Court
      - Idaho Mental Health Court

Federal courts located in Idaho

- United States District Court for the District of Idaho

=== Illinois ===
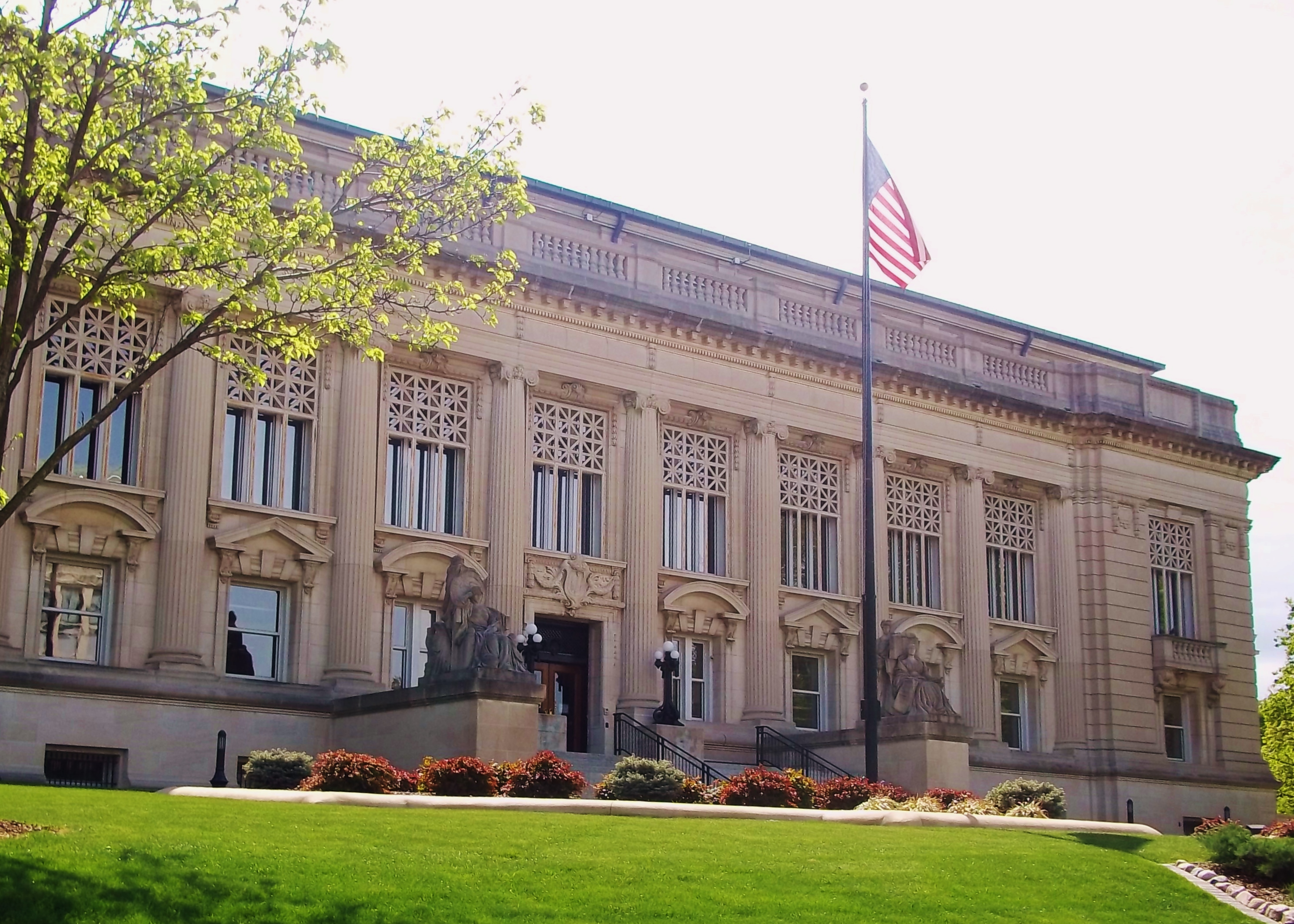
Illinois Supreme Court building, in Springfield, Illinois

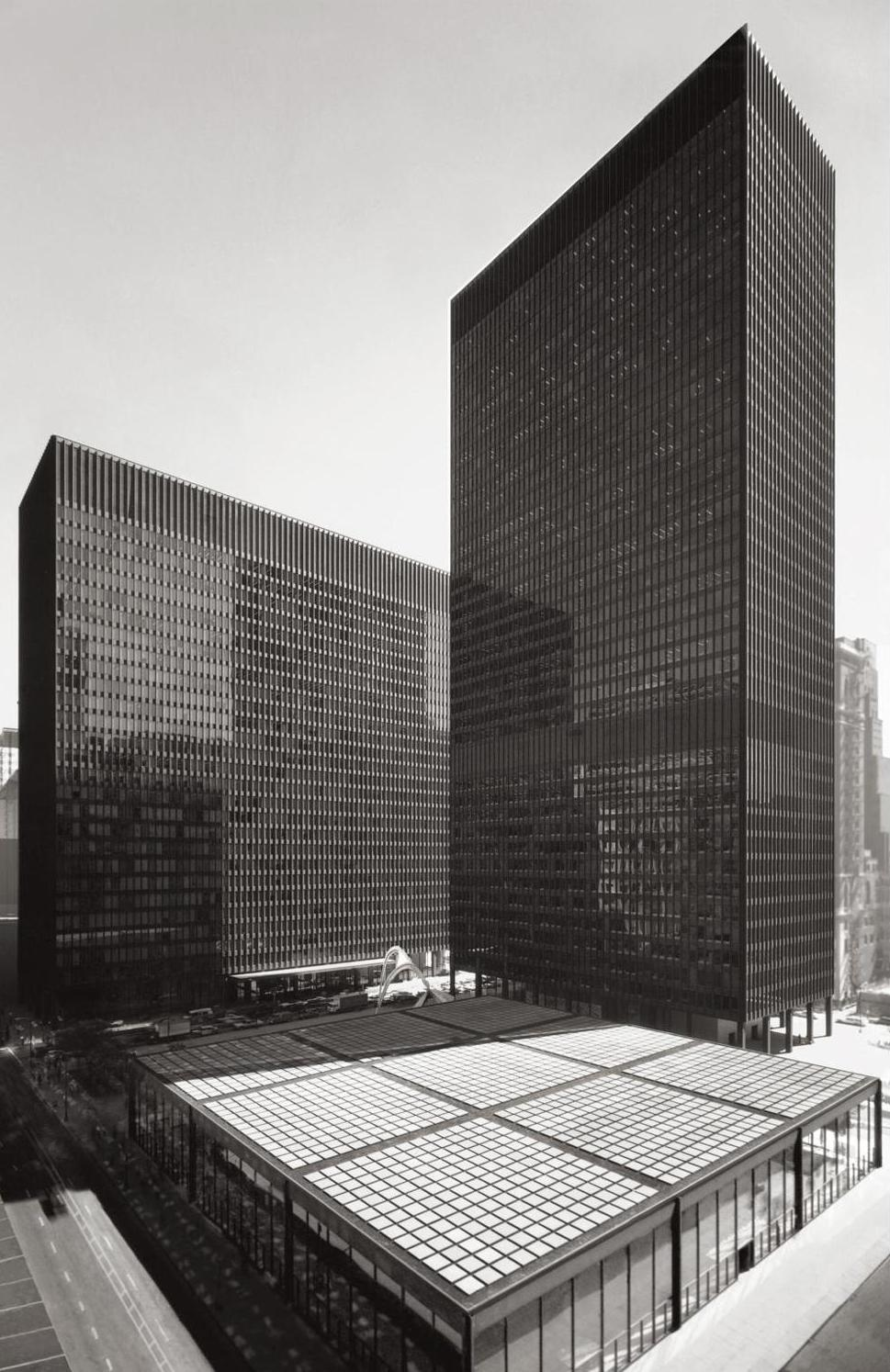
The Dirksen Federal Building in Chicago, headquarters of the United States Court of Appeals for the Seventh Circuit.

State courts of Illinois

- Supreme Court of Illinois
  - Illinois Appellate Court (5 districts)
    - Illinois Circuit Courts (24 judicial circuits)

Federal courts located in Illinois

- United States Court of Appeals for the Seventh Circuit (headquartered in Chicago, having jurisdiction over the United States District Courts of Illinois, Indiana, and Wisconsin)
- United States District Court for the Northern District of Illinois
- United States District Court for the Central District of Illinois
- United States District Court for the Southern District of Illinois

Former federal courts of Illinois

- United States District Court for the District of Illinois (extinct, subdivided in 1855)
- United States District Court for the Eastern District of Illinois (extinct, reorganized in 1978)

=== Indiana ===
State courts of Indiana

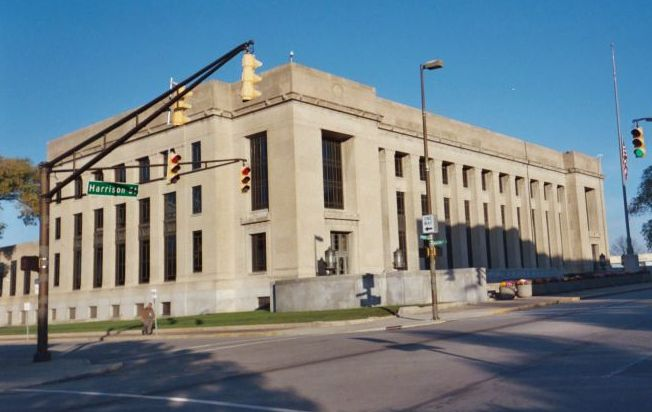
The E. Ross Adair Federal Building, seat of the Fort Wayne division of the U.S. District Court for the Northern District of Indiana

- Indiana Supreme Court
  - Indiana Court of Appeals (5 districts; previously Indiana Appellate Court)
  - Indiana Tax Court
    - Indiana Circuit Courts (91 circuits)
    - Indiana Superior Courts (177 divisions)
    - Indiana city and town courts

Federal courts located in Indiana

- United States District Court for the Northern District of Indiana
- United States District Court for the Southern District of Indiana

Former federal courts of Indiana

- United States District Court for the District of Indiana (extinct, subdivided)

=== Iowa ===
State courts of Iowa

- Iowa Supreme Court
  - Iowa Court of Appeals
    - Iowa District Courts (8 districts)

Federal courts located in Iowa

- United States District Court for the Northern District of Iowa
- United States District Court for the Southern District of Iowa

Former federal courts of Iowa

- United States District Court for the District of Iowa (extinct, subdivided)

=== Kansas ===
State courts of Kansas

- Kansas Supreme Court
  - Kansas Court of Appeals
    - Kansas District Courts (31 districts)
      - Kansas Municipal Courts

Federal courts located in Kansas

- United States District Court for the District of Kansas

=== Kentucky ===
Kentucky Court of Justice

Under an amendment to the Kentucky Constitution passed by the state's voters in 1975, judicial power in Kentucky is "vested exclusively in one Court of Justice", divided into the following:

- Kentucky Supreme Court
  - Kentucky Court of Appeals
    - Kentucky Circuit Courts (57 circuits)
      - Kentucky District Courts (59 judicial districts)

Federal courts located in this state

- United States District Court for the Eastern District of Kentucky
- United States District Court for the Western District of Kentucky

Former federal courts of Kentucky

- United States District Court for the District of Kentucky (extinct, subdivided)

=== Louisiana ===
State courts of Louisiana

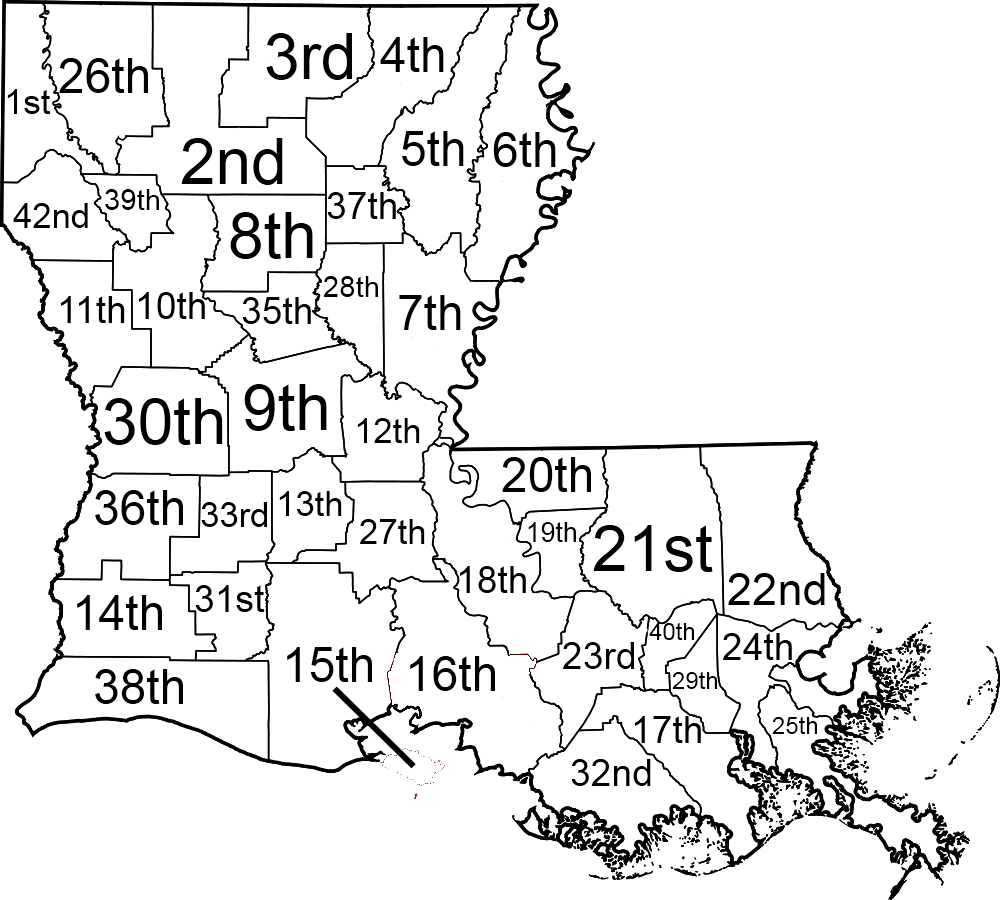
Louisiana judicial districts map

- Louisiana Supreme Court
  - Louisiana Circuit Courts of Appeal (5 circuits)
    - Louisiana District Courts (42 districts)

Federal courts located in Louisiana

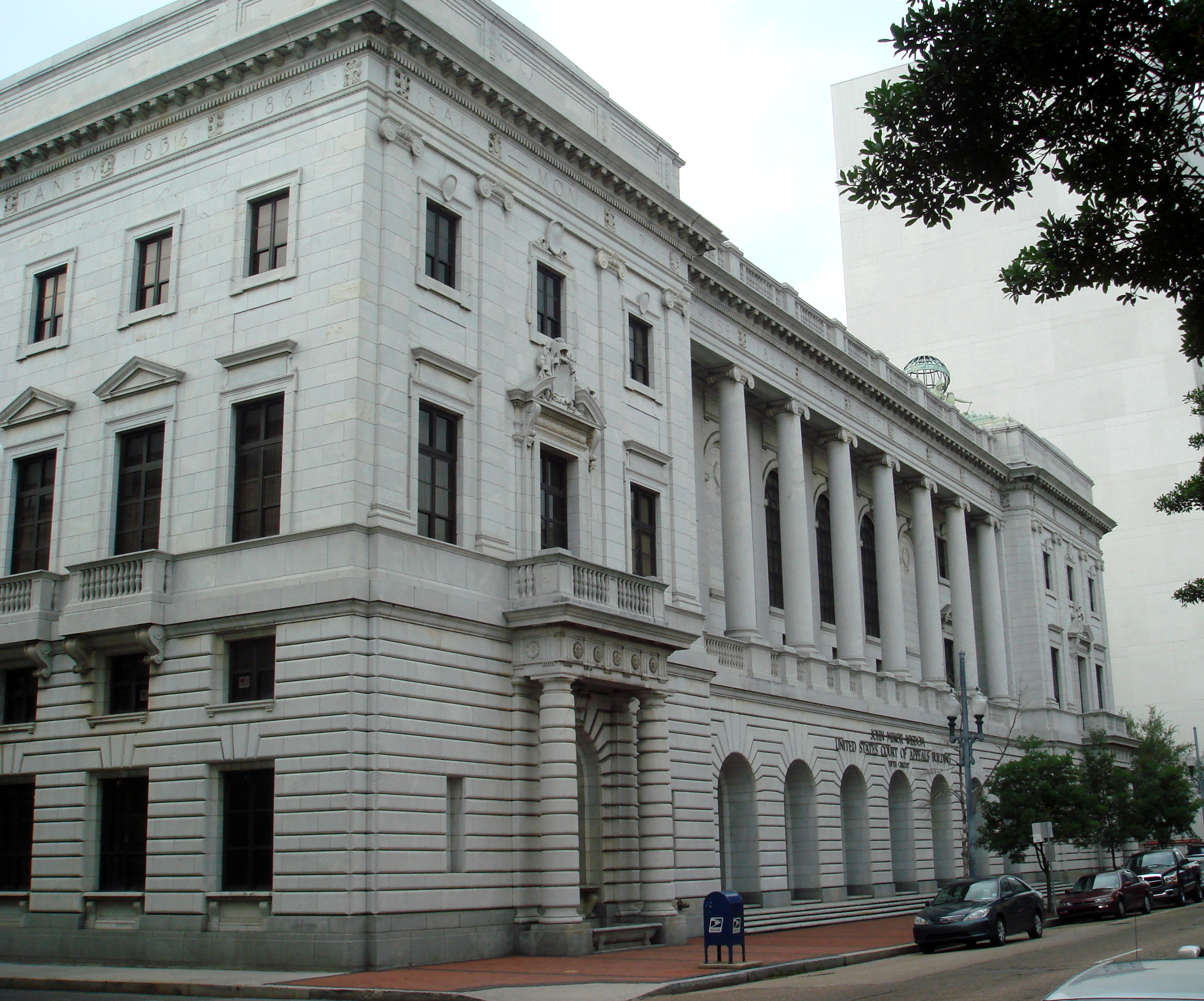
The John Minor Wisdom U.S. Courthouse, home of the United States Court of Appeals for the Fifth Circuit in New Orleans

- United States Court of Appeals for the Fifth Circuit (headquartered in New Orleans, Louisiana; having jurisdiction over the United States District Courts of Louisiana, Mississippi, and Texas)
- United States District Court for the Eastern District of Louisiana
- United States District Court for the Middle District of Louisiana
- United States District Court for the Western District of Louisiana

Former federal courts of Louisiana

- United States District Court for the District of Orleans (territorial court of the Territory of Orleans, extinct, abolished when Louisiana became a state on April 30, 1812)
- United States District Court for the District of Louisiana (extinct, subdivided)

=== Maine ===
State courts of Maine

- Maine Supreme Judicial Court
  - Maine Superior Court
    - Maine District Courts (13 districts)
    - Maine Problem-Solving Courts

Federal courts located in Maine

- United States District Court for the District of Maine

=== Maryland ===
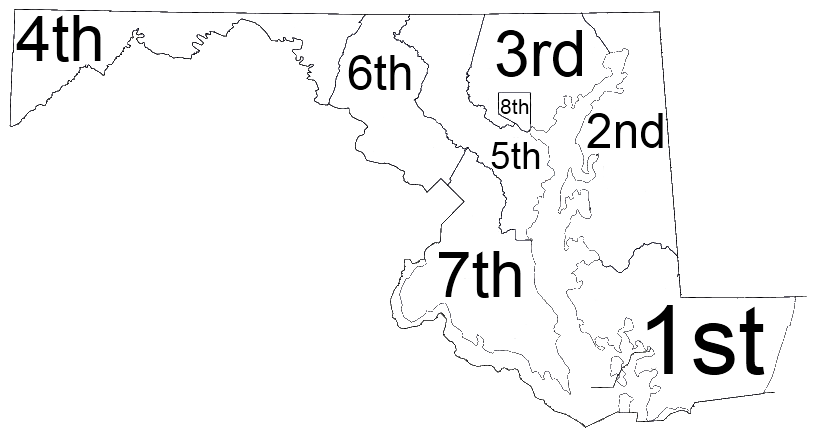
Maryland judicial circuit map

State courts of Maryland

- Supreme Court of Maryland
  - Appellate Court of Maryland
    - Maryland Circuit Courts (8 judicial circuits)
      - Maryland District Courts (34 locations in 12 judicial districts)

Federal courts located in Maryland

- United States District Court for the District of Maryland

Former federal courts of Maryland

- United States District Court for the District of Potomac (1801–1802; also contained the District of Columbia and pieces of Virginia; extinct, reorganized)

=== Massachusetts ===
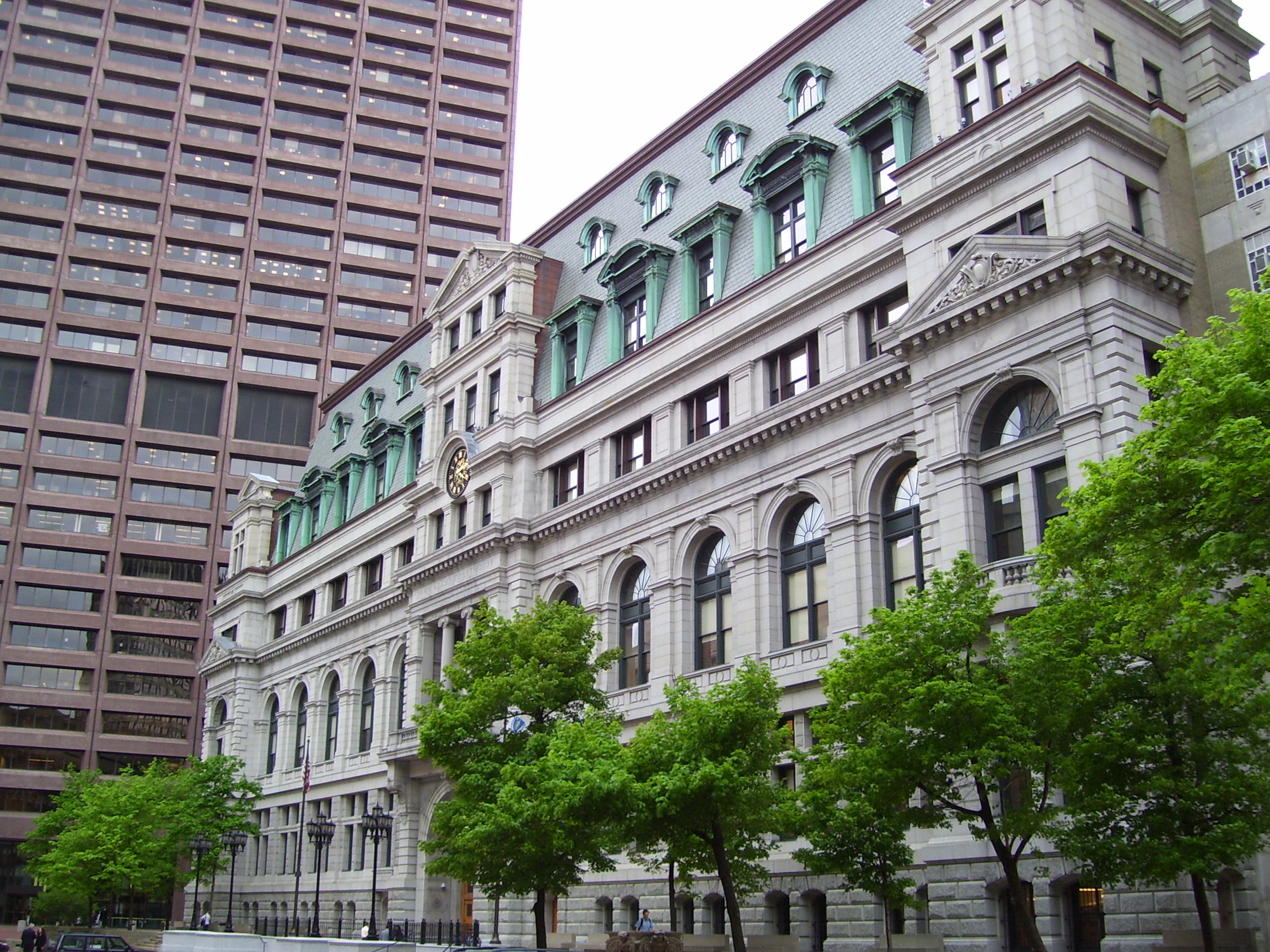
John Adams Courthouse in Boston, Massachusetts, home to the Massachusetts Supreme Judicial Court and Massachusetts Appeals Court

State courts of Massachusetts
Judicial courts

- Massachusetts Supreme Judicial Court
  - Massachusetts Appeals Court
    - Massachusetts Trial Court
      - Massachusetts Superior Court (14 divisions)
      - Massachusetts District Court
      - Massachusetts Boston Municipal Court
      - Massachusetts Land Court
      - Massachusetts Housing Court
      - Massachusetts Juvenile Court
      - Massachusetts Probate and Family Court

Administrative courts

- Massachusetts Appellate Tax Board
- Massachusetts Division of Labor Relations

Federal courts located in Massachusetts

- United States Court of Appeals for the First Circuit (headquartered in Boston, having jurisdiction over the United States District Courts of Maine, Massachusetts, New Hampshire, Rhode Island, and Puerto Rico)
- United States District Court for the District of Massachusetts

=== Michigan ===
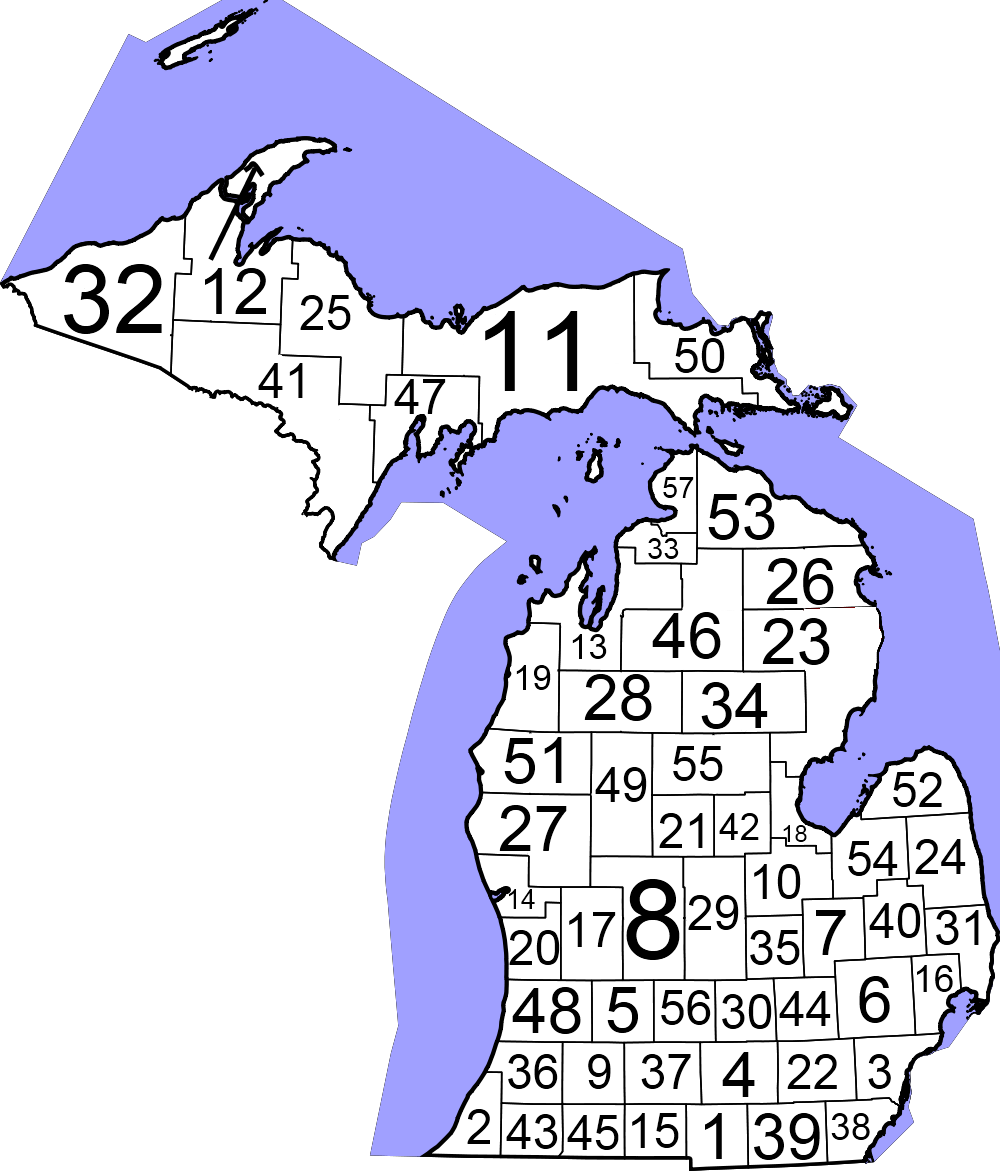
Judicial circuits map

State courts of Michigan

- Michigan Supreme Court
  - Michigan Court of Appeals
    - Michigan Circuit Courts
      - Michigan District Courts
      - Michigan Probate Courts
    - Michigan Court of Claims

Federal courts located in Michigan

- United States District Court for the Eastern District of Michigan
- United States District Court for the Western District of Michigan

Former federal courts of Michigan

- United States District Court for the District of Michigan (extinct, subdivided on February 24, 1863)

=== Minnesota ===
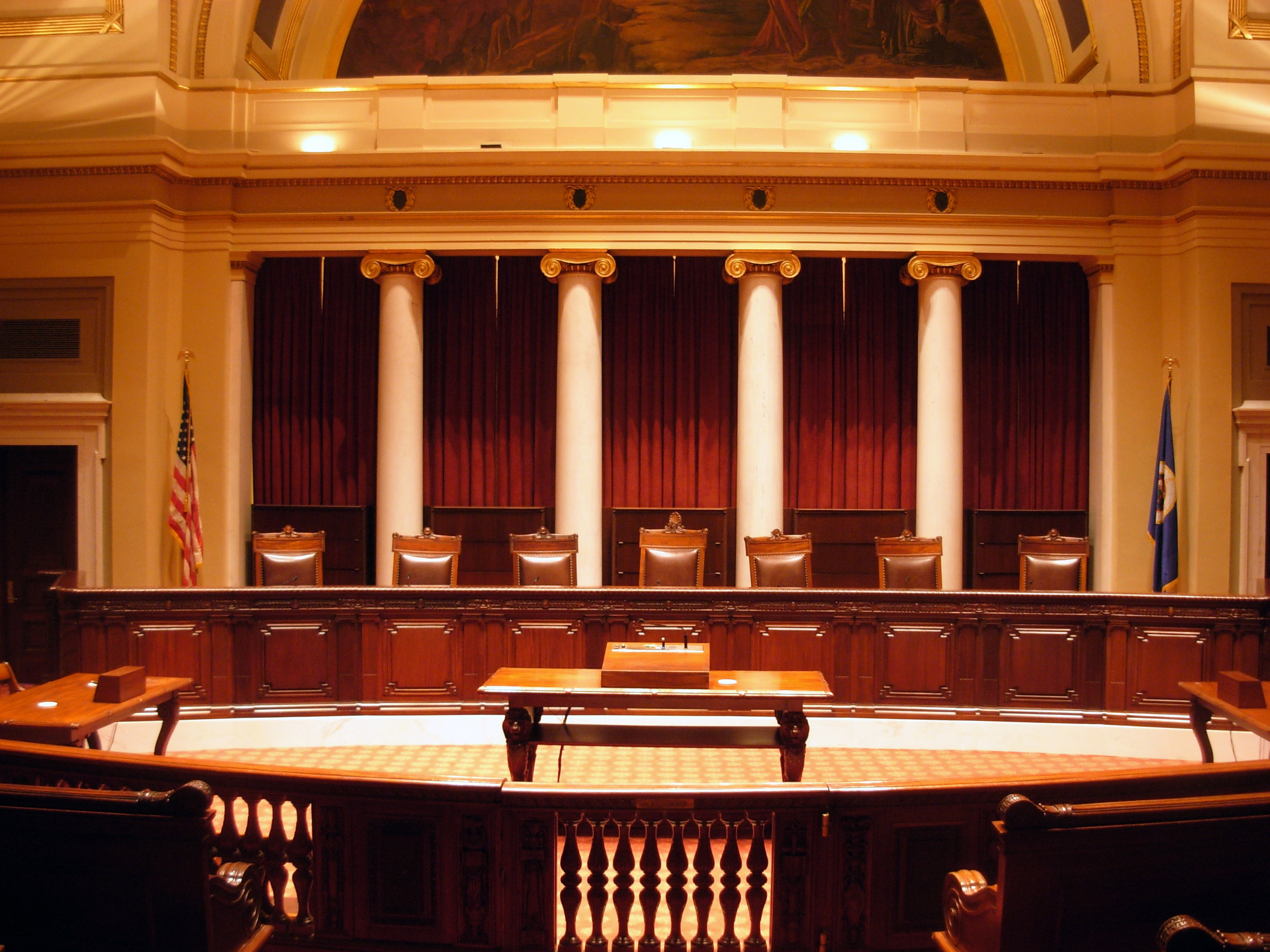
Supreme Court Chamber of the Minnesota Supreme Court in the Minnesota State Capitol in Saint Paul.

State courts of Minnesota

- Minnesota Supreme Court
  - Minnesota Court of Appeals
    - Minnesota District Courts (10 districts)
  - Minnesota Tax Court
  - Minnesota Workers' Compensation Court of Appeals

Federal courts located in Minnesota

- United States District Court for the District of Minnesota

=== Mississippi ===
State courts of Mississippi

- Supreme Court of Mississippi
  - Mississippi Court of Appeals
    - Mississippi Chancery Courts
    - Mississippi Circuit Courts (23 circuits)
      - Mississippi County Courts
        - Mississippi Justice Courts
        - Mississippi Municipal Courts
        - Mississippi Drug Courts
        - Mississippi Youth Courts

Federal courts located in Mississippi

- United States District Court for the Northern District of Mississippi
- United States District Court for the Southern District of Mississippi

Former federal courts of Mississippi

- United States District Court for the District of Mississippi (extinct, subdivided on June 18, 1838)

=== Missouri ===
State courts of Missouri

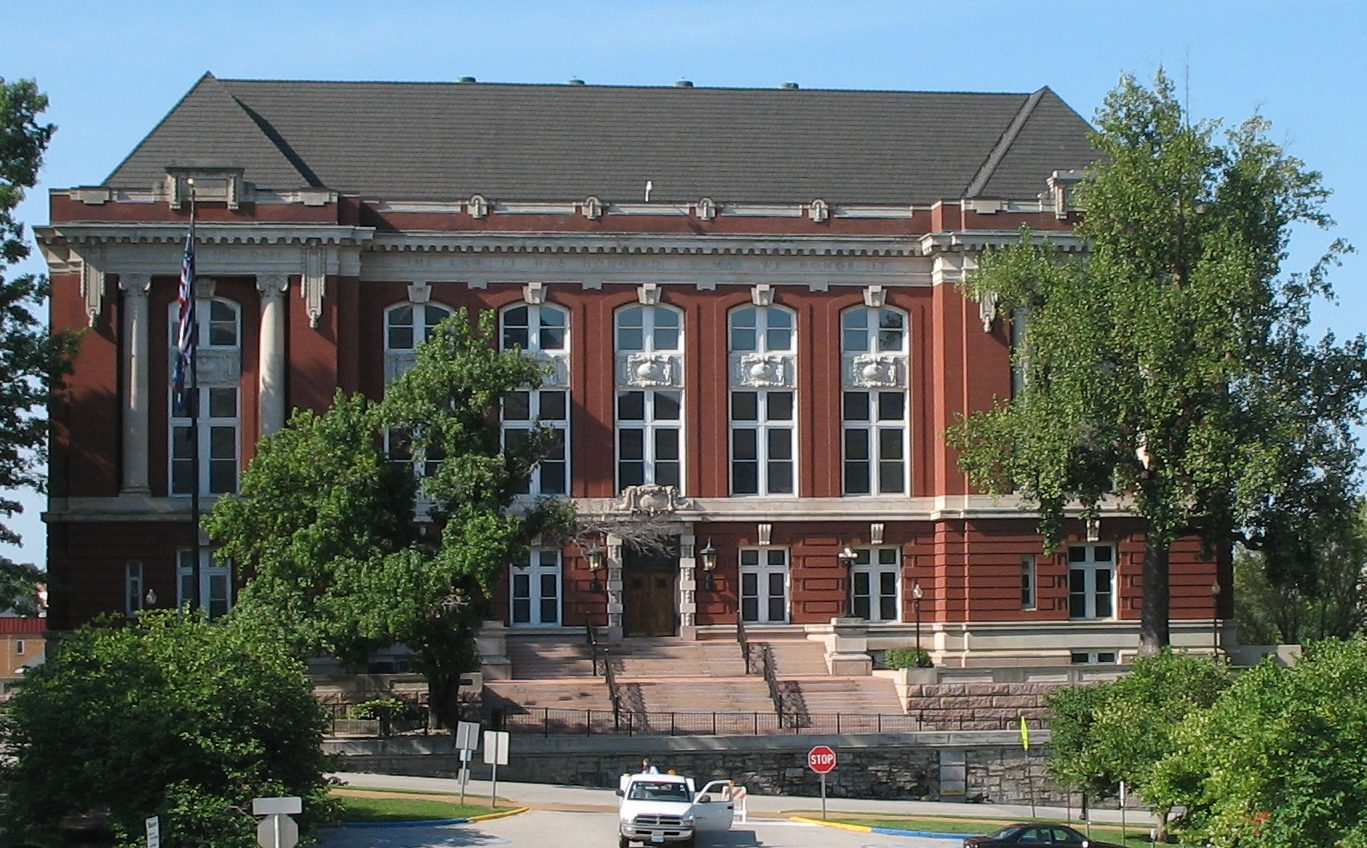
Missouri State Supreme Court building across from state capitol in Jefferson City.

- Supreme Court of Missouri
  - Missouri Court of Appeals (3 districts)
    - Missouri Circuit Courts (46 circuits)

Federal courts located in Missouri

- United States Court of Appeals for the Eighth Circuit (headquartered in St. Louis, having jurisdiction over the United States District Courts of Arkansas, Iowa, Minnesota, Missouri, Nebraska, North Dakota, South Dakota)
- United States District Court for the Eastern District of Missouri
- United States District Court for the Western District of Missouri

Former federal courts of Missouri

- United States District Court for the District of Missouri (extinct, subdivided)

=== Montana ===
State courts of Montana

- Montana Supreme Court
  - Montana District Courts (56 courts, 22 judicial districts)
    - Montana Justice Courts
    - Montana City Courts
    - Montana Municipal Courts
  - Montana Youth Courts, Generally assigned to District Court Judges, cases appealed to the Montana Supreme Court.
  - Montana Worker's Compensation Court
  - Montana Water Court
  - Montana Asbestos Claims Court

Federal courts located in Montana

- United States District Court for the District of Montana
- United States Bankruptcy Court for the District of Montana

=== Nebraska ===
State courts of Nebraska

- Nebraska Supreme Court
  - Nebraska Court of Appeals
    - Nebraska District Courts (12 districts)
      - Nebraska County Courts (93 courts, one for each county)
      - Nebraska Juvenile Courts (3 courts, in Douglas, Lancaster, and Sarpy counties)
      - Nebraska Problem-Solving Courts (35 courts statewide)
    - Nebraska Workers' Compensation Court

Federal courts located in Nebraska

- United States District Court for the District of Nebraska

=== Nevada ===
State courts of Nevada

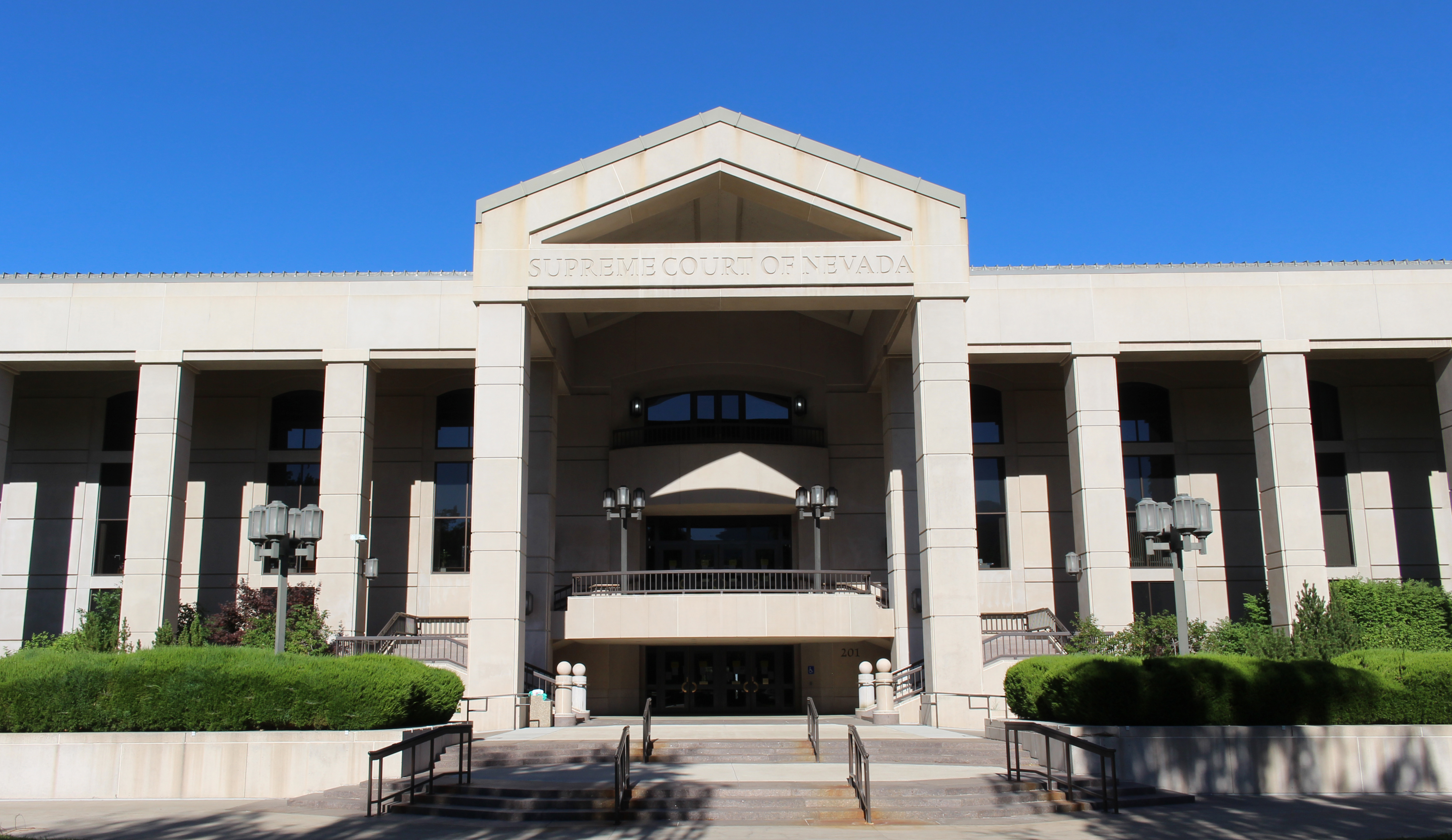
The headquarters of the Supreme Court of Nevada in Carson City.

- Supreme Court of Nevada
  - Nevada Court of Appeals
    - District Courts of Nevada (11 districts)
      - Municipal Courts of Nevada
      - Justice Courts of Nevada

Federal courts located in Nevada

- United States District Court for the District of Nevada

=== New Hampshire ===
State courts of New Hampshire

- New Hampshire Supreme Court
  - New Hampshire Superior Court
  - New Hampshire District Court
  - New Hampshire Family Division
  - New Hampshire Probate Court

Federal courts located in New Hampshire

- United States District Court for the District of New Hampshire

=== New Jersey ===
State courts of New Jersey

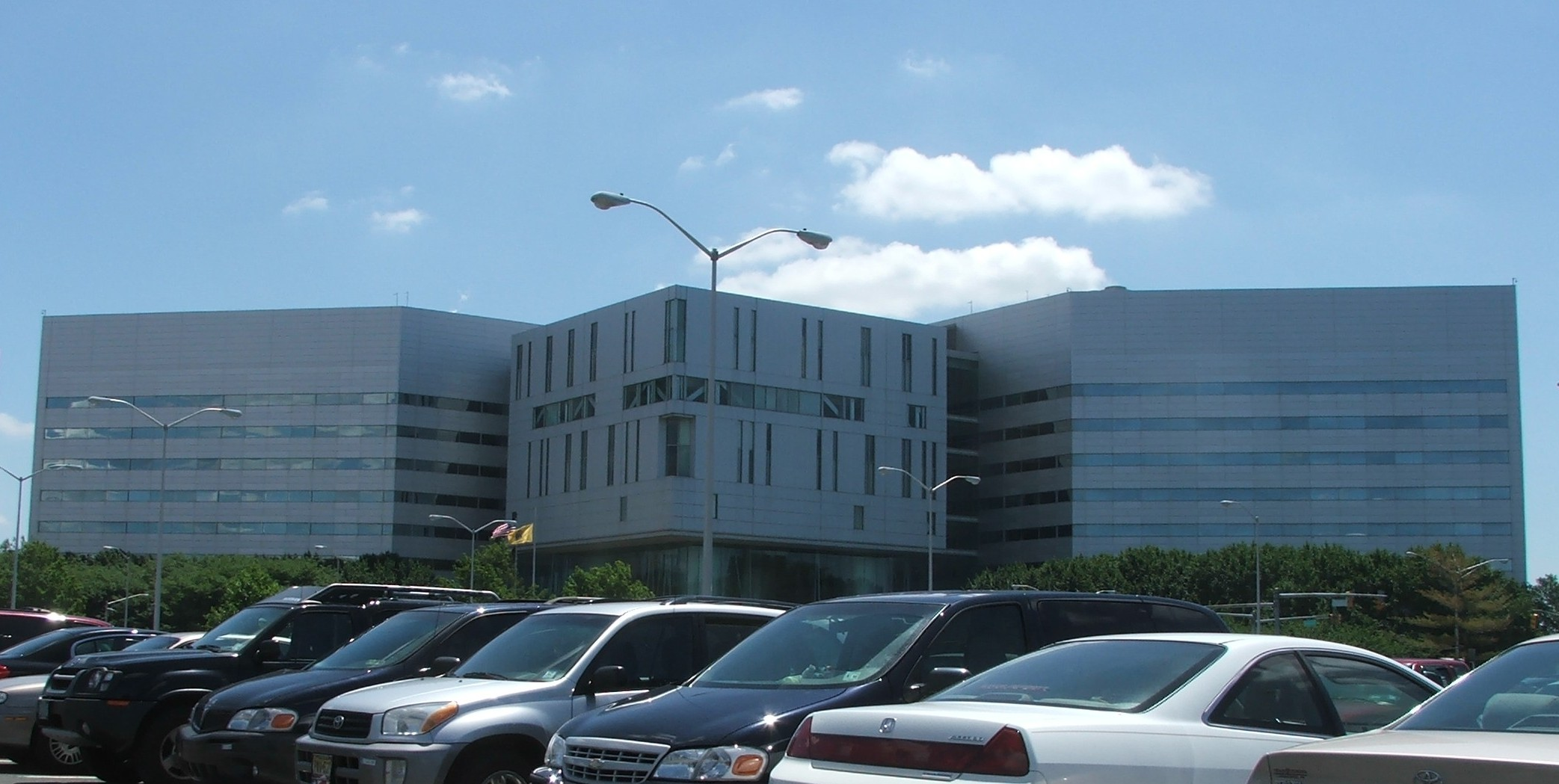
Richard J. Hughes Justice Complex, Trenton, New Jersey: The seat of the New Jersey Supreme Court and the central administrative offices of all statewide courts in New Jersey.

- New Jersey Supreme Court (previously the New Jersey Court of Errors and Appeals)
  - New Jersey Superior Court (including the Appellate Division; 15 vicinages)
  - New Jersey Tax Court
  - New Jersey Municipal Courts (including Joint Municipal Courts and the Court of the Palisades Interstate Park)

Federal courts located in New Jersey

- United States District Court for the District of New Jersey

Former federal courts of New Jersey

- United States District Court for the District of East Jersey (1801–1802; extinct, merged)
- United States District Court for the District of West Jersey (1801–1802; extinct, merged)

=== New Mexico ===
State courts of New Mexico

- New Mexico Supreme Court
  - New Mexico Court of Appeals
    - New Mexico District Court (13 judicial districts)
      - New Mexico Magistrate Court
      - Bernalillo County Metropolitan Court
      - New Mexico Municipal Court
      - New Mexico Probate Court

Federal courts located in New Mexico

- United States District Court for the District of New Mexico

=== New York ===
State courts of New York

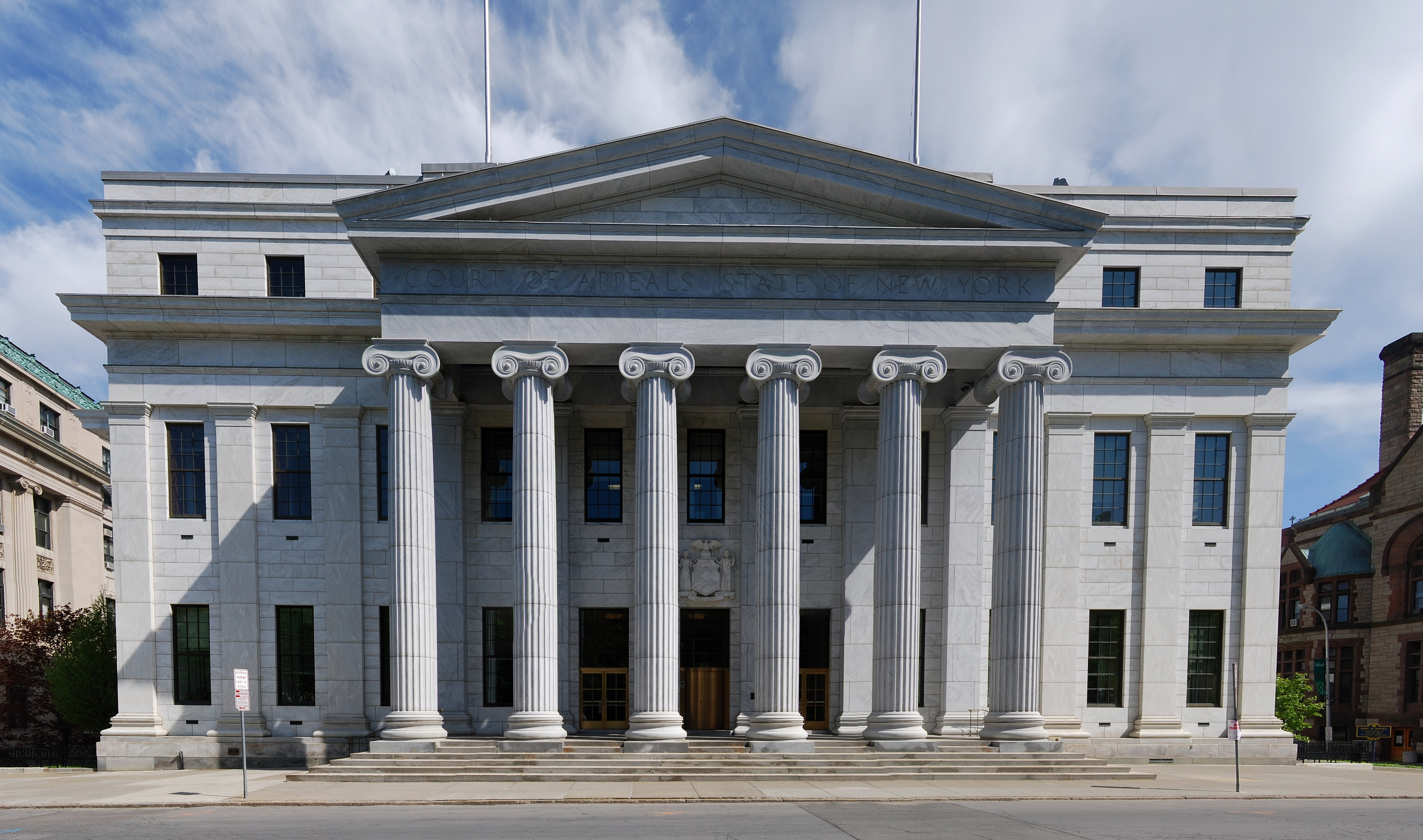
The 1842 courthouse of the New York Court of Appeals in Albany

- New York Court of Appeals
  - New York Supreme Court, Appellate Division (4 departments)
    - New York Supreme Court (13 judicial districts)
    - New York County Court (57 courts, one for each county outside New York City)
    - New York Surrogate's Court
    - New York Family Court
    - New York Court of Claims
    - New York City courts
      - New York City Criminal Court
      - New York City Civil Court
    - New York District Court
    - New York town and village courts

Federal courts located in New York

- United States Court of Appeals for the Second Circuit (headquartered in Manhattan, having jurisdiction over the United States District Courts of Connecticut, New York, and Vermont)
  - United States District Court for the Eastern District of New York
  - United States District Court for the Northern District of New York
  - United States District Court for the Southern District of New York
  - United States District Court for the Western District of New York
- United States Court of International Trade (headquartered in New York City)

Former federal courts of New York

- United States District Court for the District of New York (extinct, subdivided)

=== North Carolina ===
State courts of North Carolina

- North Carolina Supreme Court
  - North Carolina Court of Appeals
    - North Carolina Superior Court (48 districts)
    - North Carolina District Courts (41 districts)

Federal courts located in North Carolina

- United States District Court for the Eastern District of North Carolina
- United States District Court for the Middle District of North Carolina
- United States District Court for the Western District of North Carolina

Former federal courts of North Carolina

- United States District Court for the District of North Carolina (extinct, subdivided)
- United States District Court for the District of Edenton (1794–1797; extinct, reorganized)
- United States District Court for the District of New Bern (1794–1797; extinct, reorganized)
- United States District Court for the District of Wilmington (1794–1797; extinct, reorganized)
- United States District Court for the District of Albemarle (1801–1872; extinct, reorganized)
- United States District Court for the District of Cape Fear (1801–1872; extinct, reorganized)
- United States District Court for the District of Pamptico (1801–1872; extinct, reorganized)

=== North Dakota ===
State courts of North Dakota

- North Dakota Supreme Court
  - North Dakota District Courts (7 judicial districts)
    - North Dakota Municipal Courts

Federal courts located in North Dakota

- United States District Court for the District of North Dakota

=== Ohio ===
State courts of Ohio

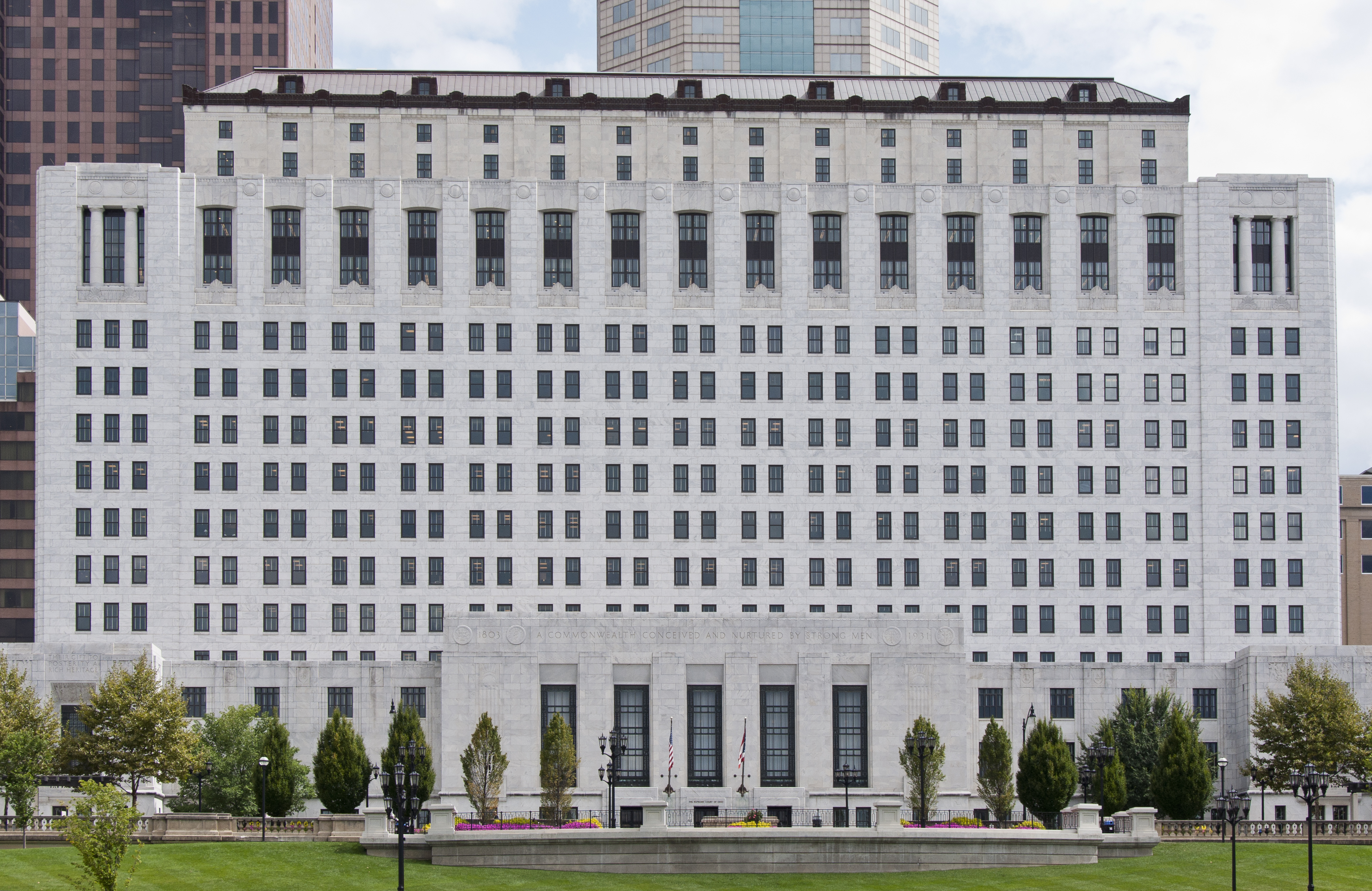
The Thomas J. Moyer Ohio Judicial Center in Columbus, headquarters of the Supreme Court of Ohio

- Supreme Court of Ohio
  - Ohio District Courts of Appeal (12 districts)
    - Ohio Court of Claims
    - Ohio Courts of Common Pleas
      - Ohio Municipal Courts
      - Ohio County Courts
        - Ohio Mayor's Courts

Federal courts located in this state

- United States Court of Appeals for the Sixth Circuit (headquartered in Cincinnati, having jurisdiction over the United States District Courts of Kentucky, Michigan, Ohio, and Tennessee)
- United States District Court for the Northern District of Ohio
- United States District Court for the Southern District of Ohio

Former federal courts of Ohio

- United States District Court for the District of Ohio (extinct, subdivided)

=== Oklahoma ===
State courts of Oklahoma

- Oklahoma Supreme Court (civil)
- Oklahoma Court of Criminal Appeals (criminal)
  - Oklahoma Court of Civil Appeals
    - Oklahoma District Courts (26 judicial districts with 77 district courts)
    - Oklahoma Workers' Compensation Court

Federal courts located in Oklahoma

- United States District Court for the Eastern District of Oklahoma
- United States District Court for the Northern District of Oklahoma
- United States District Court for the Western District of Oklahoma

=== Oregon ===
State courts of Oregon

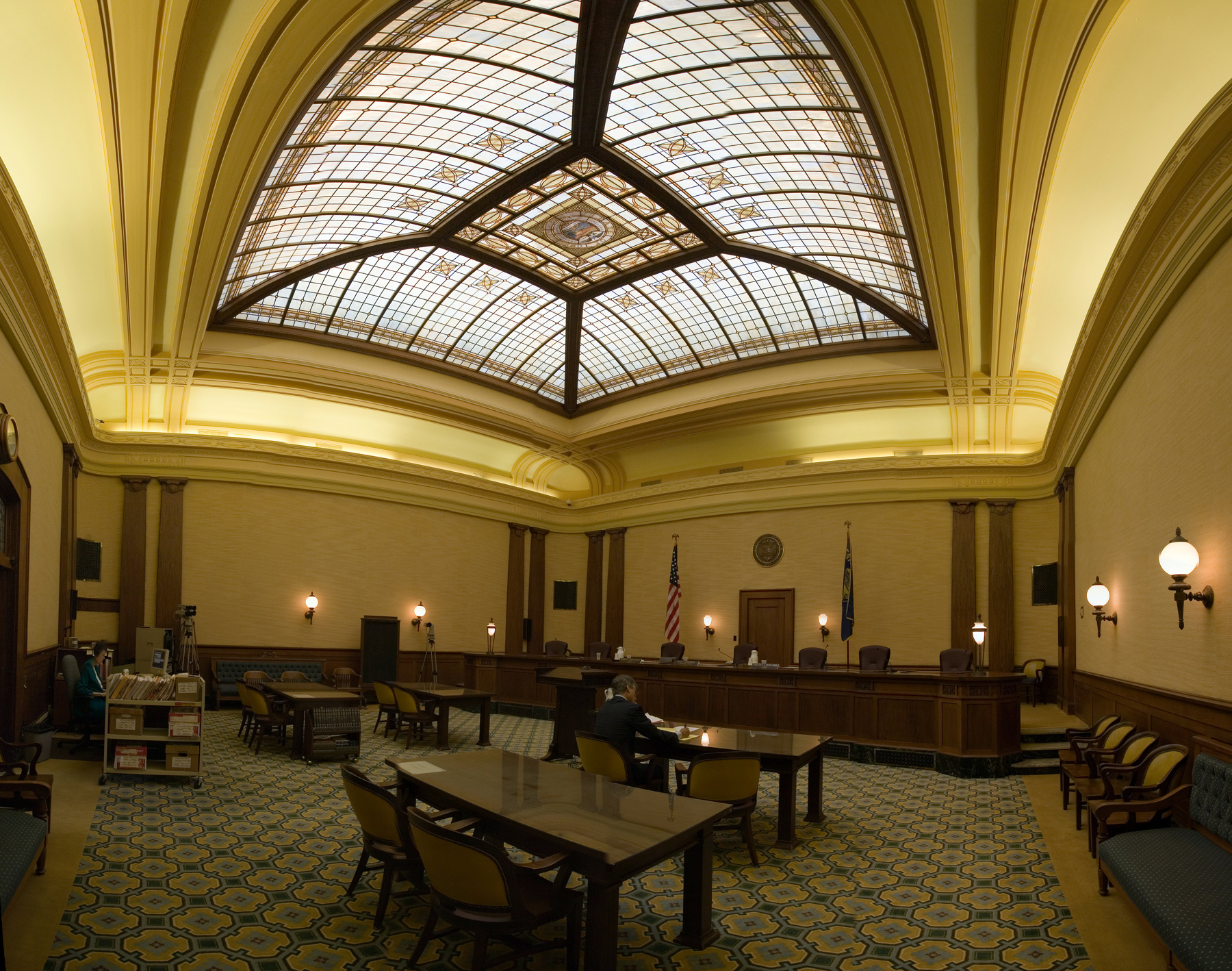
Courtroom of the Oregon Supreme Court.

- Oregon Supreme Court
  - Oregon Court of Appeals
    - Oregon Circuit Courts (36 courts, one for each county, administratively divided between 27 judicial districts)
    - Oregon Justice Courts
    - Oregon Municipal Courts
    - Oregon County Courts
  - Oregon Tax Court

Federal courts located in Oregon

- United States District Court for the District of Oregon

=== Pennsylvania ===
State courts of Pennsylvania

- Supreme Court of Pennsylvania
  - Superior Court of Pennsylvania (3 districts)
  - Commonwealth Court of Pennsylvania
    - Pennsylvania Courts of Common Pleas (60 judicial districts)
      - Magisterial District Courts

Former colonial and state courts of Pennsylvania

- Provincial Court (1684-1722)
- Orphans' Courts (1688-1968 when merged with Courts of Common Pleas)
- Justice of the Peace Courts (1682 - now Magisterial District Courts)
- Court for the Trial of Negroes (1700-1780)
- District Courts (1811-1873)
- County Courts (1682-1722)
- Court of Chancery (1720-1735)
- High Court of Errors and Appeals (1780-1808)
  - Court of Admiralty (1697-1789)
  - Register's Courts
- Courts of Quarter Sessions of the Peace (1682–1969)
- Courts of Oyer and Terminer and General Gaol Delivery (1802-1910)

Federal courts located in Pennsylvania

- United States Court of Appeals for the Third Circuit (headquartered in Philadelphia, having jurisdiction over the United States District Courts of Delaware, New Jersey, Pennsylvania, and the United States Virgin Islands)
  - United States District Court for the Eastern District of Pennsylvania
  - United States District Court for the Middle District of Pennsylvania
  - United States District Court for the Western District of Pennsylvania

Former federal courts located in Pennsylvania

- Court of Appeals in Cases of Capture (1780-1787)
- United States District Court for the District of Pennsylvania (1789-1815 when it was subdivided)

=== Rhode Island ===
State courts of Rhode Island

- Rhode Island Supreme Court
  - Rhode Island Superior Courts
    - Rhode Island District Courts
    - Rhode Island Family Courts
    - Rhode Island Workers' Compensation Courts
    - Rhode Island Traffic Tribunals

Federal courts located in Rhode Island

- United States District Court for the District of Rhode Island

=== South Carolina ===
State courts of South Carolina

- South Carolina Supreme Court
  - South Carolina Court of Appeals
    - South Carolina Circuit Courts (16 circuits)
    - South Carolina Family Courts
    - South Carolina Probate Courts
    - South Carolina Magistrate Courts
    - South Carolina Municipal Courts

Federal courts located in South Carolina

- United States District Court for the District of South Carolina

=== South Dakota ===
State courts of South Dakota

- South Dakota Supreme Court
  - South Dakota Circuit Courts (7 circuits)
  - South Dakota Magistrate Courts

Federal courts located in South Dakota

- United States District Court for the District of South Dakota

=== Tennessee ===
State courts of Tennessee

- Tennessee Supreme Court
  - Tennessee Court of Appeals (3 grand divisions)
  - Tennessee Court of Criminal Appeals (3 grand divisions)
    - Tennessee Circuit Courts (32 judicial districts)
    - Tennessee Chancery and Probate Courts (32 judicial districts)
    - Tennessee Criminal Courts (32 judicial districts)
    - Tennessee Municipal and City Courts
    - Tennessee Juvenile and Family Courts
    - Tennessee General Session Courts

Federal courts located in Tennessee

- United States District Court for the Eastern District of Tennessee
- United States District Court for the Middle District of Tennessee
- United States District Court for the Western District of Tennessee

Former federal courts of Tennessee

- United States District Court for the District of Tennessee (subdivided, as three districts, in 1862)

=== Texas ===
State courts of Texas

- Texas Supreme Court (Civil)
- Texas Court of Criminal Appeals (Criminal)
  - Texas Courts of Appeals (14 districts)
    - Texas District Courts (420 districts)
    - Texas Business Court
    - Texas County Courts
      - Texas Justice Courts
      - Texas Municipal Courts

Federal courts located in Texas

- United States District Court for the Eastern District of Texas
- United States District Court for the Northern District of Texas
- United States District Court for the Southern District of Texas
- United States District Court for the Western District of Texas

Former federal courts of Texas

- United States District Court for the District of Texas (extinct, subdivided)

=== Utah ===
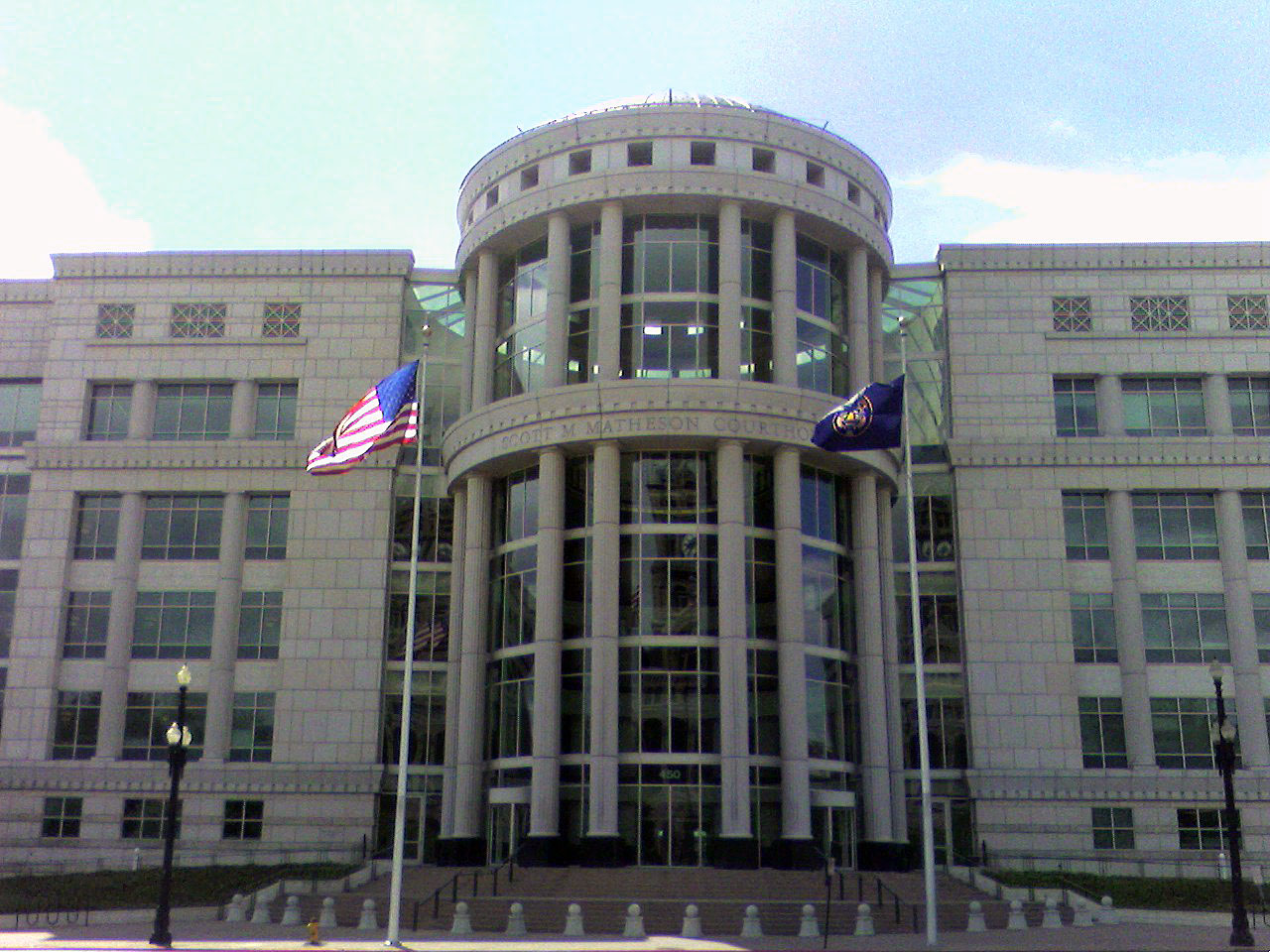
The Utah Supreme Court meets in the Scott M. Matheson Courthouse.

State courts of Utah

- Utah Supreme Court
  - Utah Court of Appeals
    - Utah District Courts (8 districts)
    - Utah Business and Chancery Court
    - Utah Juvenile Courts
    - Utah Justice Courts

Federal courts located in Utah

- United States District Court for the District of Utah

=== Vermont ===
State courts of Vermont

- Vermont Supreme Court
- Vermont Superior Court
  - Civil Division
  - Criminal Division
  - Environmental Division
  - Family Division
  - Probate Division
- Vermont Judicial Bureau

Federal courts located in Vermont

- United States District Court for the District of Vermont

=== Virginia ===
State courts of Virginia

- Supreme Court of Virginia
  - Court of Appeals of Virginia
    - Virginia Circuit Court (120 courts divided among 31 judicial circuits)
      - Virginia General District Court (courts in 32 districts)
      - Virginia Juvenile and Domestic Relations District Court (courts in 32 districts)

Federal courts located in Virginia

- United States Court of Appeals for the Fourth Circuit (headquartered in Richmond, having jurisdiction over the United States District Courts of Maryland, North Carolina, South Carolina, Virginia, and West Virginia)
- United States District Court for the Eastern District of Virginia
- United States District Court for the Western District of Virginia

Former federal courts of Virginia

- United States District Court for the District of Virginia (extinct, subdivided)
- United States District Court for the District of Potomac (1801-1802; also contained the District of Columbia and pieces of Maryland; extinct, reorganized)

=== Washington ===
State courts of Washington

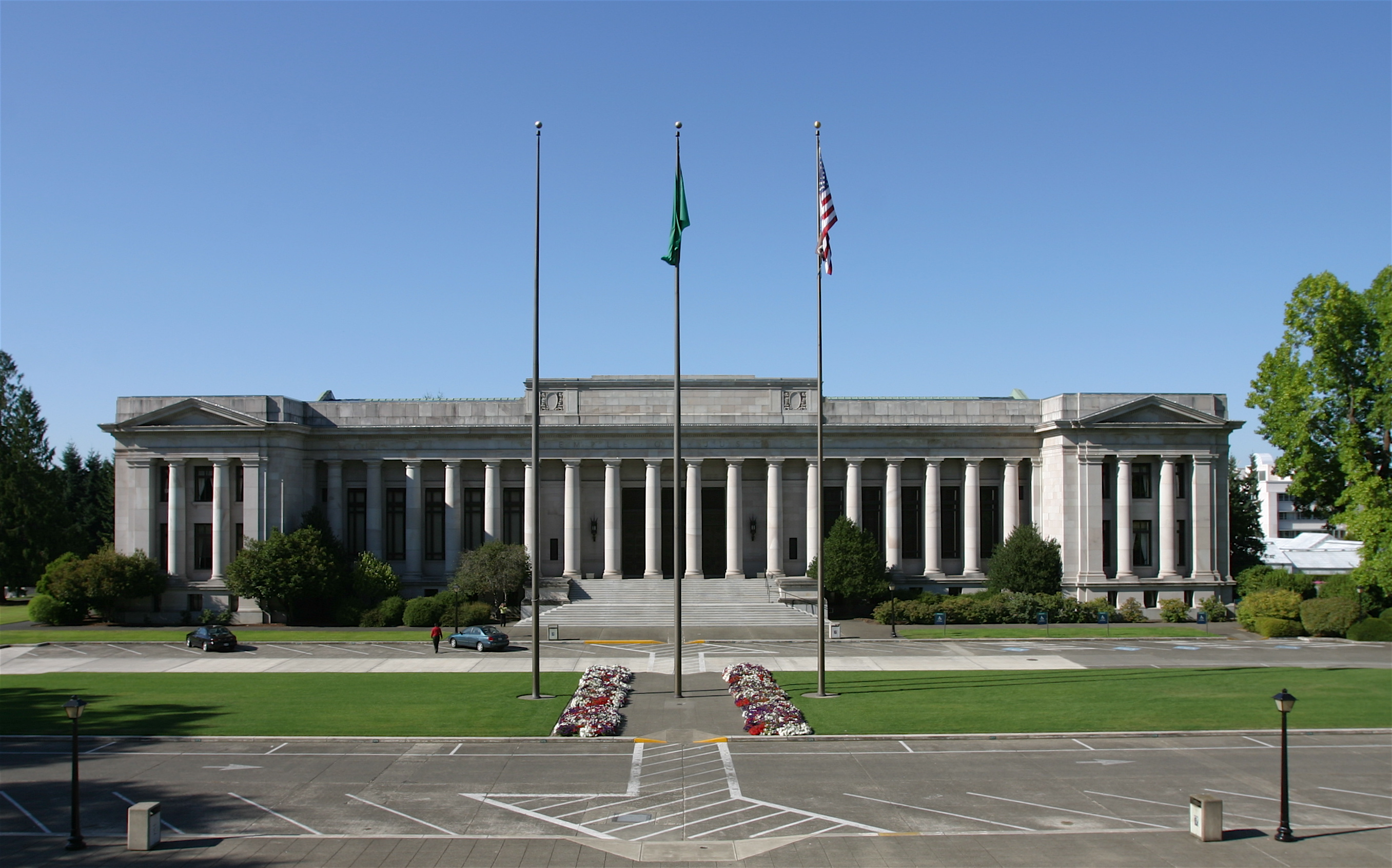
The headquarters of the Washington Supreme Court in Olympia.

- Washington Supreme Court
  - Washington Court of Appeals (3 divisions)
    - Washington Superior Courts (39 courts of general jurisdiction, one for each county)
      - Washington District Courts (Courts of limited jurisdiction)
      - Washington Municipal Courts (Courts of limited jurisdiction)

Federal courts located in Washington

- United States District Court for the Eastern District of Washington
- United States District Court for the Western District of Washington

Former federal courts of Washington

- United States District Court for the District of Washington (extinct, subdivided)

=== West Virginia ===
State courts of West Virginia

- Supreme Court of Appeals of West Virginia
  - Intermediate Court of Appeals of West Virginia (Effective July 1, 2022)
    - West Virginia Circuit Courts (30 judicial circuits)
      - West Virginia Family Courts
      - West Virginia Magistrate Courts
      - West Virginia Municipal Courts

Federal courts located in West Virginia

- United States District Court for the Northern District of West Virginia
- United States District Court for the Southern District of West Virginia

Former federal courts of West Virginia

- United States District Court for the District of West Virginia (extinct, subdivided)

=== Wisconsin ===
State courts of Wisconsin

- Wisconsin Supreme Court (7 justices)
  - Wisconsin Court of Appeals (4 districts, 16 judges)
    - Wisconsin Circuit Court (9 judicial administrative districts (1–5; 7–10), 69 circuits, 261 judges)
      - Wisconsin Municipal Courts

Federal courts located in Wisconsin

- United States District Court for the Eastern District of Wisconsin
- United States District Court for the Western District of Wisconsin

Former federal courts of Wisconsin

- United States District Court for the District of Wisconsin (extinct, subdivided)

=== Wyoming ===
State courts of Wyoming

- Wyoming Supreme Court
  - Wyoming District Courts (9 districts)
  - Wyoming Chancery Court
    - Wyoming Circuit Courts

Federal courts located in Wyoming

- United States District Court for the District of Wyoming

== Courts in the District of Columbia ==
- District of Columbia Court of Appeals
  - Superior Court of the District of Columbia

Federal courts located in the District of Columbia

- Supreme Court of the United States
  - United States Court of Appeals for the District of Columbia Circuit
    - United States District Court for the District of Columbia
    - United States Tax Court
  - United States Court of Appeals for the Federal Circuit
    - United States Court of Appeals for Veterans Claims
    - United States Court of Federal Claims
  - United States Court of Appeals for the Armed Forces
  - United States Foreign Intelligence Surveillance Court of Review
    - United States Foreign Intelligence Surveillance Court

Former federal courts in the District of Columbia

- United States District Court for the District of Potomac (1801–1802; also contained pieces of Maryland and Virginia; extinct, reorganized)

== Courts of the Territories of the United States ==
=== American Samoa ===
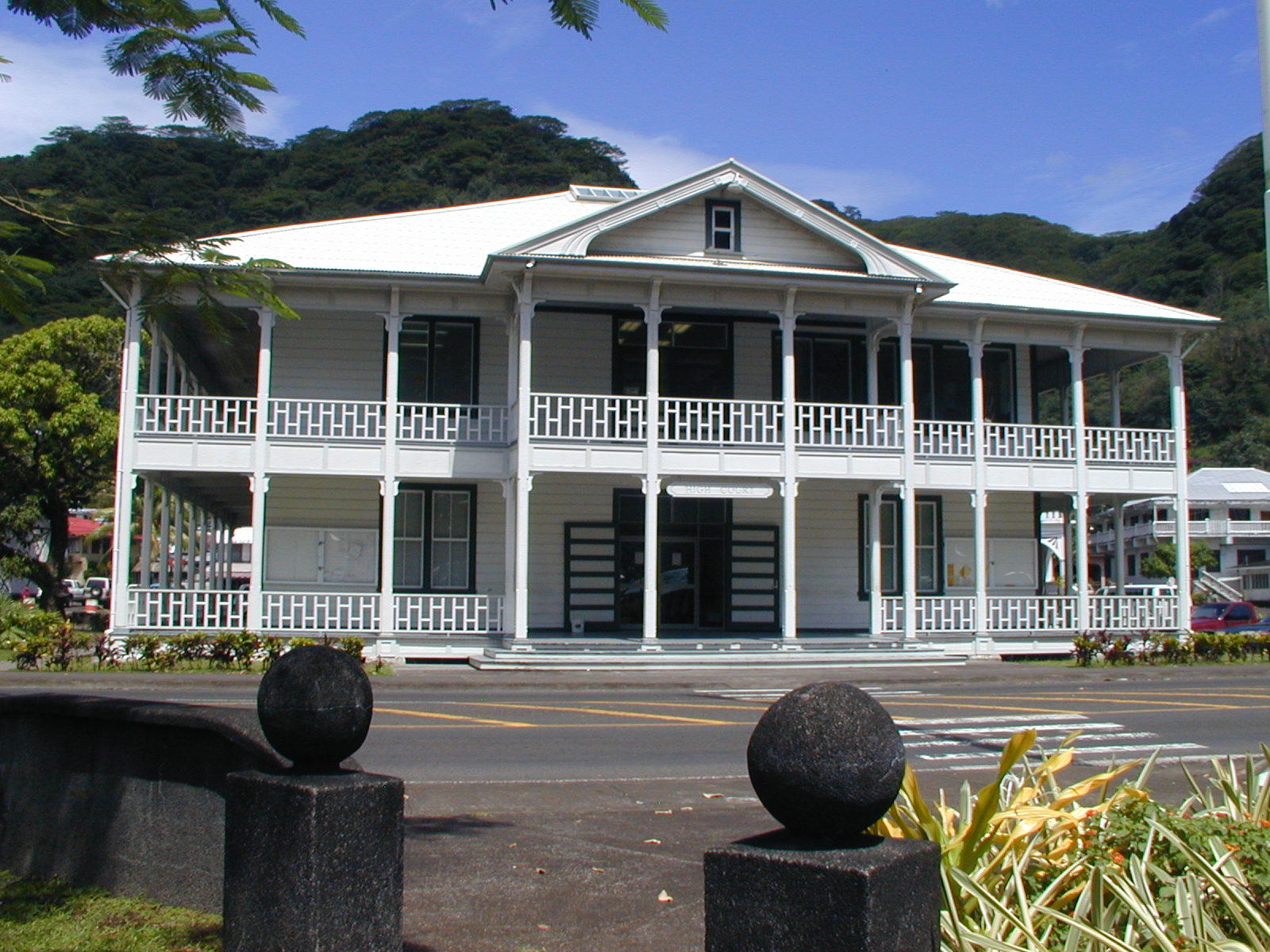
High Court of American Samoa courthouse

- High Court of American Samoa

=== Guam ===
- Supreme Court of Guam
  - Superior Court of Guam

==== United States territorial court ====
- District Court of Guam

=== Northern Mariana Islands ===
- Northern Mariana Islands Supreme Court
  - Northern Mariana Islands Superior Court

==== United States territorial court ====
- United States District Court for the Northern Mariana Islands

=== Panama Canal Zone ===
- United States District Court for the Canal Zone (abolished 1982)

=== Puerto Rico ===
- Supreme Court of Puerto Rico (Tribunal Supremo de Puerto Rico)
  - Circuit Court of Appeals of Puerto Rico (Tribunal de Apelaciones)
  - * Courts of First Instance of Puerto Rico (Tribunal de Primera Instancia; 13 divisions)

Federal courts located in Puerto Rico:

- United States District Court for the District of Puerto Rico

=== United States Virgin Islands ===
- United States Virgin Islands Supreme Court
  - United States Virgin Islands Superior Court (2 divisions)

==== United States territorial court ====
- District Court of the Virgin Islands

== Extraterritorial courts of the United States ==
- United States Court for China (1906 to 1943), appointed judge held court in cities in China including Shanghai, Hankow, Tientsin, and Canton.
- United States Court for Berlin (1979), existed on paper since 1955, but constituted in fact only once, to hear a single case.

== U.S. judicial system in popular culture ==
Due to its involvement in the resolution of crimes and conflicts, which are an intricate part of drama, the U.S. judicial system is often portrayed in American literature and films.

Several Hollywood films such as A Few Good Men (1992) and Runaway Jury (2003) are set around its courts.
