= Government of Hawaii =

- Great Seal of the State of Hawaii
- Part of: United States of America
- Constitution: Constitution of Hawaii

Legislative branch
- Name: Legislature
- Type: Bicameral
- Meeting place: Hawaii State Capitol
- Upper house
- Name: Senate
- Presiding officer: Ron Kouchi, President
- Lower house
- Name: House of Representatives
- Presiding officer: Nadine Nakamura, Speaker

Executive branch
- Head of state and government
- Title: Governor
- Currently: Josh Green
- Appointer: Election
- Cabinet
- Leader: Governor
- Deputy leader: Lieutenant Governor
- Headquarters: Hawaii State Capitol

Judicial branch
- Name: Judiciary of Hawaii
- Courts: Courts of Hawaii
- Supreme Court of Hawaii
- Chief judge: Vladimir Devens
- Seat: Honolulu, Hawaii

The Government of Hawaii (Hawaiian: Aupuni o Hawaiʻi) is the governmental structure as established by the Constitution of Hawaii, the 50th state to have joined the United States.

== Executive branch ==
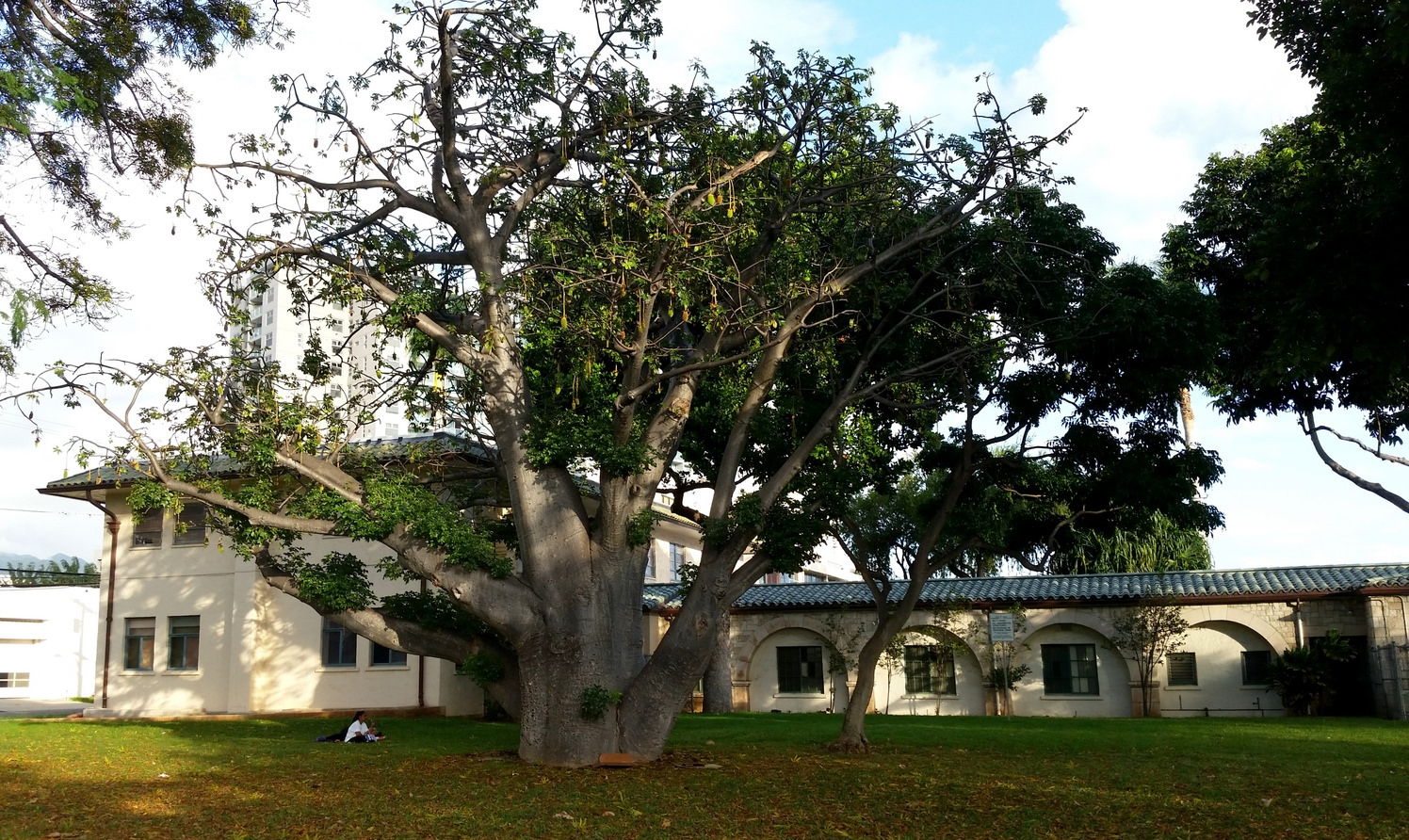
Hawaii State Department of Agriculture building, Honolulu. Large Baobab tree in foreground.

=== Statewide elected offices ===
- Governor of Hawaii
- Lieutenant Governor of Hawaii

The current Governor of Hawaii is Josh Green (D) and the current Lieutenant Governor of Hawaii is Sylvia Luke (D).

=== Agencies ===
- Department of Accounting and General Services
  - Hawaiʻi State Foundation on Culture and the Arts
- Department of Agriculture and Biosecurity
- Department of the Attorney General
- Department of Budget and Finance
- Department of Business, Economic Development, and Tourism
  - Hawaii Technology Development Corporation
- Department of Commerce and Consumer Affairs
  - Hawaii Public Utilities Commission
- Department of Corrections and Rehabilitation
- State of Hawaii Department of Defense
  - (see also: Hawaii National Guard)
  - Hawaii Emergency Management Agency
- Department of Education
  - Hawaii State Public Library System
- Department of Hawaiian Homelands
  - (see also: Hawaiian home land)
- Department of Health
- Department of Human Resources Development
- Department of Human Services
- Department of Labor and Industrial Relations
- Department of Land and Natural Resources
- Department of Law Enforcement
- Department of Taxation
- Department of Transportation
- University of Hawaii

==== Former Agencies ====
- Department of Public Safety

^{[a]}In 2024, the Department of Public Safety was split up into the Department of Corrections and Rehabilitation and the Department of Law Enforcement.

== Legislative branch ==
- Hawaii State Legislature
  - Hawaii State House of Representatives
  - Hawaii State Senate

== Judicial branch ==
- Hawaii State Judiciary
  - Supreme Court of Hawaii
  - Hawaii Intermediate Court of Appeals
  - Hawaii State Circuit Courts
  - Hawaii State Family Courts
  - Hawaii State District Courts
  - Hawaii State Land Court
  - Hawaii State Tax Appeal Court

== Independent state agencies ==
- Office of Hawaiian Affairs

== Counties ==
- County of Hawaiʻi – county seat in Hilo
- City and County of Honolulu – county seat in Honolulu
- Kalawao County
- County of Kauaʻi – county seat in Līhuʻe
- County of Maui – county seat in Wailuku
