= 2002 Virginia ballot measures =

The 2002 Virginia State Elections took place on Election Day, November 5, 2002, the same day as the U.S. Senate and the U.S. House elections in the state. The only statewide elections on the ballot were two constitutional referendums to amend the Virginia State Constitution and two government bond referendums. Because Virginia state elections are held on off-years, no statewide officers or state legislative elections were held. All referendums were referred to the voters by the Virginia General Assembly.

== Question 1 ==
The Judicial Power and Jurisdiction Act spells out in detail when and how a convicted felon may petition the Virginia Supreme Court (and thus bypass lower courts) to issue a writ of actual innocence. The petition must claim that the petitioner is actually innocent of the crime for which he or she was convicted, set out an exact description of the human biological or DNA evidence and testing supporting his or her innocence, and explain that the evidence was not available when the petitioner was convicted. The Supreme Court may dismiss or grant the petition and may overturn or modify the conviction after it considers the petition and the Commonwealth's response, the previous records of the case, and other evidence it may require.

Question 1
Choice	Votes	%
For	1,091,828	72.71
Against	409,807	27.29
Total	1,501,635	100.00
Source: - Official Results

== Question 2 ==
The proposed amendment authorizes local governments in the state to create a tax exemption for certain properties by an ordinance and eliminates the need for action by the General Assembly. The amendment provides that the local governing body may adopt an ordinance to exempt property "used by its owner for religious, charitable, patriotic, historical, benevolent, cultural, or public park and playground purposes." The General Assembly continues to have authority to enact laws setting out restrictions and conditions on these tax exemptions.

Question 2
Choice	Votes	%
For	964,441	64.32
Against	534,956	35.68
Total	1,499,397	100.00
Source: - Official Results

== Bond Question 1 ==
The Educational Facilities Act allows the Commonwealth to sell a maximum of $900,488,645 dollars in bonds for the purpose of raising funds to pay for capital projects at state-supported colleges, universities, museums and other educational facilities.

Bond Question 1
Choice	Votes	%
For	1,126,932	72.88
Against	419,423	27.12
Total	1,546,355	100.00
Source: - Official Results

== Bond Question 2 ==
The Parks and Recreational Facilities Act allows the Commonwealth to sell a maximum of $119,040,000 dollars in bonds for the purpose of raising funds to pay for capital projects at state-supported parks and recreational facilities.

Bond Question 2
Choice	Votes	%
For	1,051,393	68.79
Against	477,058	31.21
Total	1,528,451	100.00
Source: - Official Results
