= Judiciary of Hawaii =

U.S. state judiciary

The Hawaiʻi State Judiciary is the official name of the judicial system of Hawaiʻi in the United States. Based in Honolulu, the Hawaiʻi State Judiciary is a unified state court system that functions under the Chief Justice of the Hawaiʻi State Supreme Court who is its administrator-in-chief.

== Principal courts ==
The Hawaiʻi State judiciary has four levels; two at the trial level and two at the appellate level. The trial-level courts are the district court, for lesser offenses and minor civil cases, and circuit court, for more serious offenses and major civil cases. There are two appellate courts, the Intermediate Court of Appeals, the lower appellate court, and the Supreme Court, for appeals from the decision of the Intermediate Court via certiorari, and for certain cases, such as election cases, over which it exercises original jurisdiction.

The specific roles and names of the courts are as follows:

- The Hawaii State Supreme Court is the state supreme court. It is the high court of the state and makes binding decisions over appeals from the lower courts upon transfer from the Intermediate Court of Appeals and cases eligible to be heard directly by the Hawaiʻi Supreme Court. It is also responsible for court rules, licensing and disciplining attorneys.
- The Hawaii Intermediate Court of Appeals is the state's intermediate appellate court. It reviews appeals from state trial court or administrative agency decisions. Its decisions, under certain circumstances, are subject to the Hawai`i Supreme Court's review.
- The primary civil and criminal court in Hawaii is the body known as the Hawaii state circuit courts. They rule all jury trial cases and have exclusive jurisdiction over probate, guardianship and criminal felony cases as well as civil cases where the amount in controversy exceeds $25,000.
- The Hawaii State family courts deal with family law. They have exclusive jurisdiction over cases with minors involving delinquency, status offenses, abuse and neglect, termination of parental rights, adoption guardianships and detention among others. The Family Courts also oversee cases of domestic relations, include divorce, child support, and custody cases.
- The Hawaii state district courts have exclusive jurisdiction over traffic infractions, landlord-tenant disputes, civil bench trials cases where the amount in controversy is under $10,000, civil cases where claim does not exceed $25,000, criminal offenses punishable by fine or by imprisonment not exceeding one year, county-ordinance cases and petitions for restraining orders. The Hawaii State Small Claims Court is a division of district court dealing with small claims.
- The Hawaii Land Court has exclusive jurisdiction over cases involving land titles and is a part of circuit court.
- The Hawaii State Tax Appeal Court has jurisdiction over cases involving property, excise, liquor, tobacco, income and insurance taxes, and is a part of circuit court.
