= List of courts of the District of Columbia =

This is a list of courts in the District of Columbia, in the United States.

== District courts ==
- District of Columbia Court of Appeals
  - Superior Court of the District of Columbia

== Federal courts ==
- Supreme Court of the United States
  - United States Court of Appeals for the District of Columbia Circuit
    - United States District Court for the District of Columbia
    - United States Tax Court
  - United States Court of Appeals for the Federal Circuit
    - United States Court of Appeals for Veterans Claims
    - United States Court of Federal Claims
  - United States Court of Appeals for the Armed Forces
  - United States Foreign Intelligence Surveillance Court of Review
    - United States Foreign Intelligence Surveillance Court

== Former federal courts ==
- United States District Court for the District of Potomac (1801–1802; also contained pieces of Maryland and Virginia; extinct, reorganized)
