= Hawaii state circuit court =

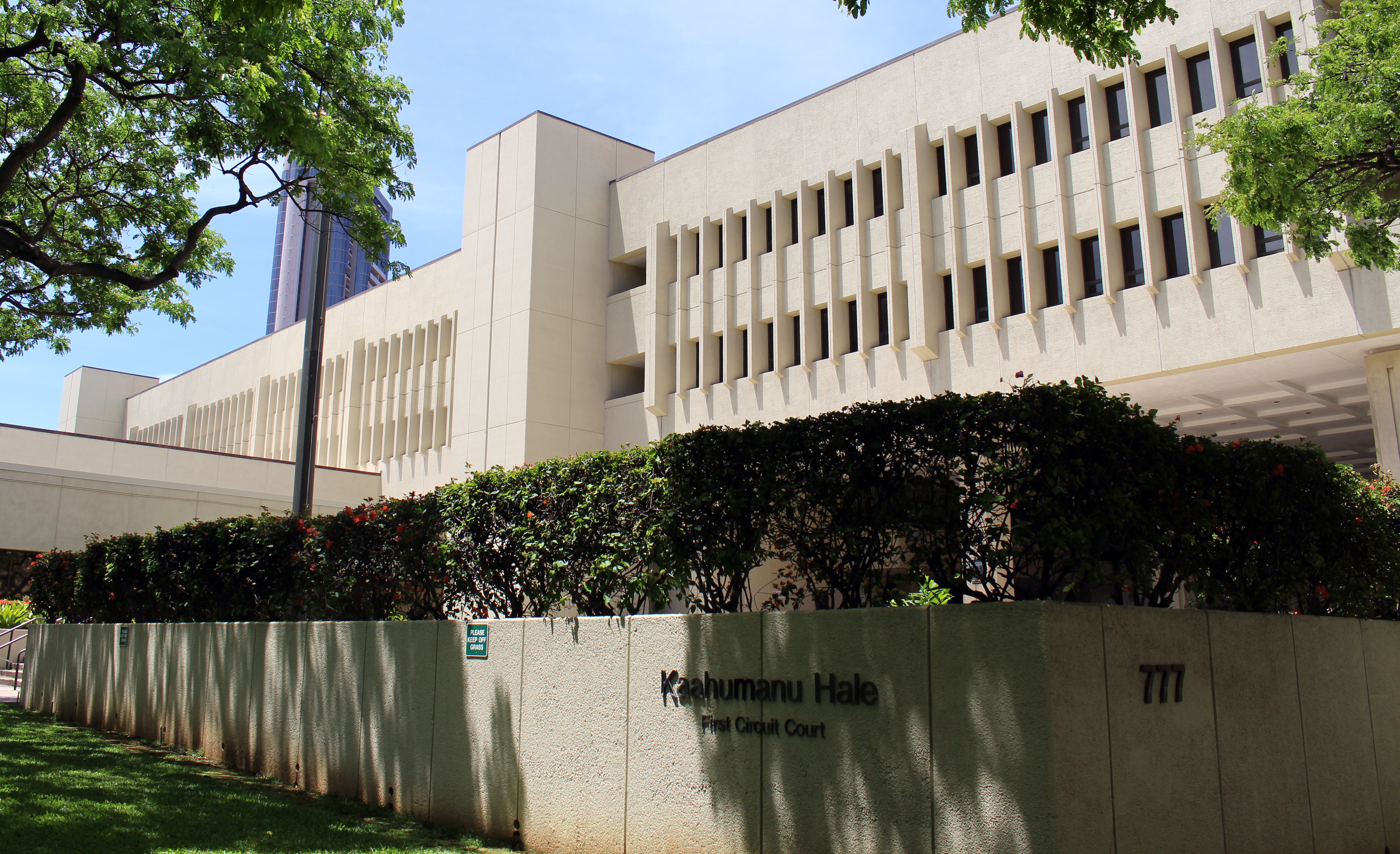
- Kaahumanu Hale, home of the First Circuit Court in Honolulu
- Appeals to: Hawaii Intermediate Court of Appeals
- Website: courts.state.hi.us/courts/circuit

Division map
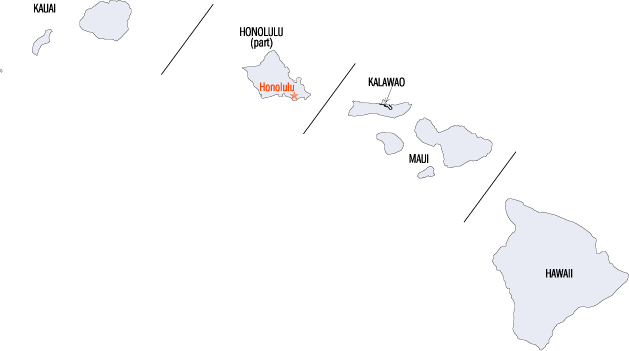

The Hawaii state circuit courts are the trial courts of general jurisdiction in Hawaii. They are the primary civil and criminal courts of the Hawaii State Judiciary. The circuit courts are the only Hawaii state courts to conduct jury trials. (The District Courts conduct bench trials while the Intermediate Court of Appeals and Supreme Court are appellate courts).

The circuit courts have exclusive original jurisdiction over probate and guardianship cases, criminal felony cases, and civil cases where the amount in controversy exceeds US$40,000.

The circuit courts are organized into four circuits:

- First: Oahu (based in Honolulu)
- Second: Maui, Molokai, and Lanai (based in Wailuku)
- Third: Hawaii (based in Hilo)
- Fifth: Kauai and Niihau (based in Lihue)

There is currently no Fourth Circuit, because the Fourth Circuit merged into the Third Circuit in 1943.

The largest and most important of the circuit courts is the First Circuit in Honolulu.

The state legislature has created additional statewide courts on paper, but failed to constitute them as actual courts with their own judges, support staff, and courthouses. Instead, judges of the First Circuit serve as the statewide Tax Appeal Court and one judge of the First Circuit serves as the judge of the statewide Land Court.
