= Courts of Hawaii =

List of courts in Hawaii, United States

Courts of Hawaii include:

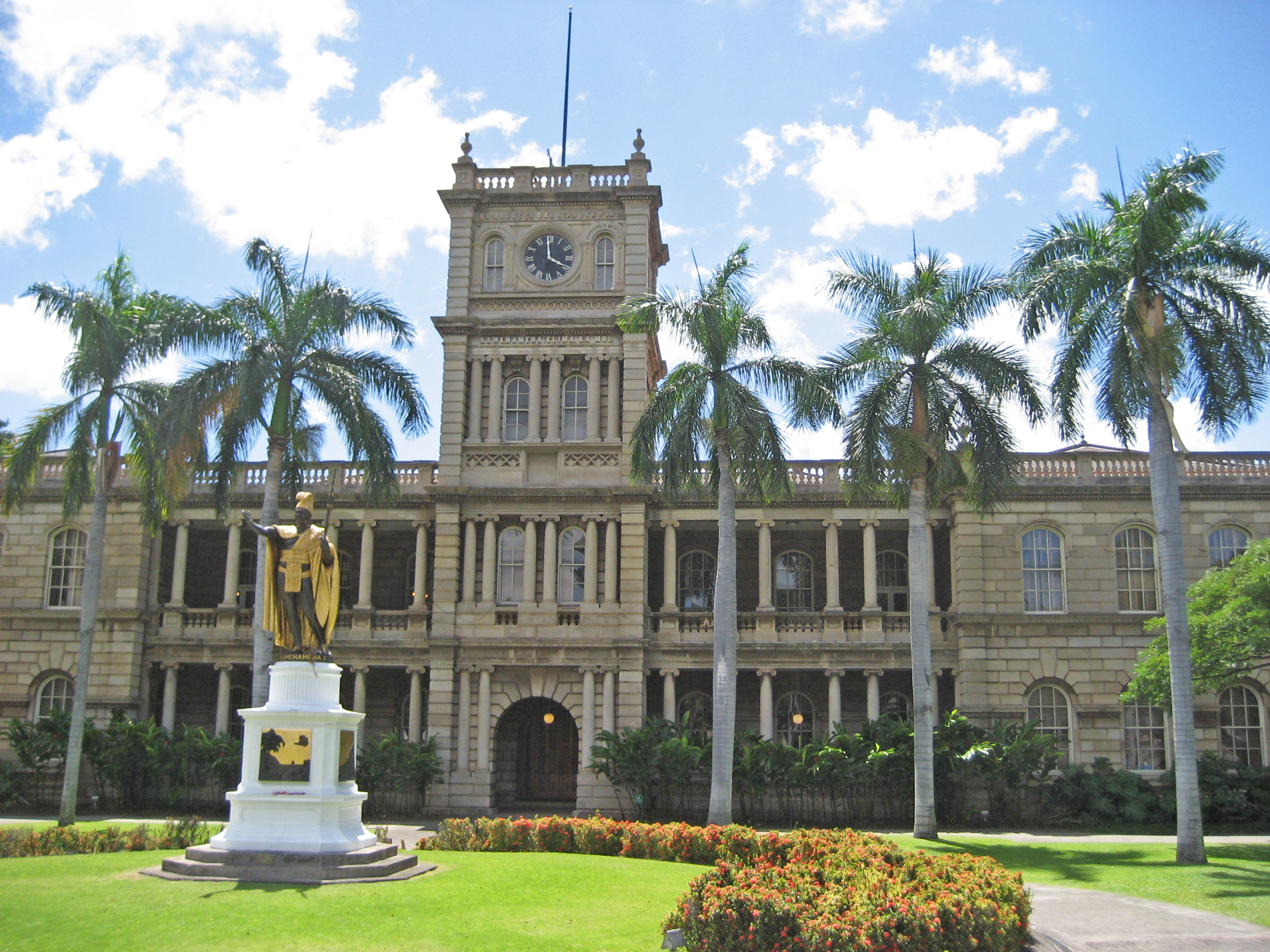
Aliʻiōlani Hale, in Honolulu, the building where the Hawaiʻi State Supreme Court meets

State courts of Hawaii

- Hawaiʻi State Supreme Court
  - Hawaii Intermediate Court of Appeals
    - Hawaii state circuit courts (4 circuits)
    - Hawaii State family courts (4 circuits)
    - Hawaii state district courts (including Small Claims Court)
    - Hawaiʻi State Land Court
    - Hawaii Tax Appeal Court

Federal courts located in Hawaii

- United States District Court for the District of Hawaii
