= Georgia Superior Courts =

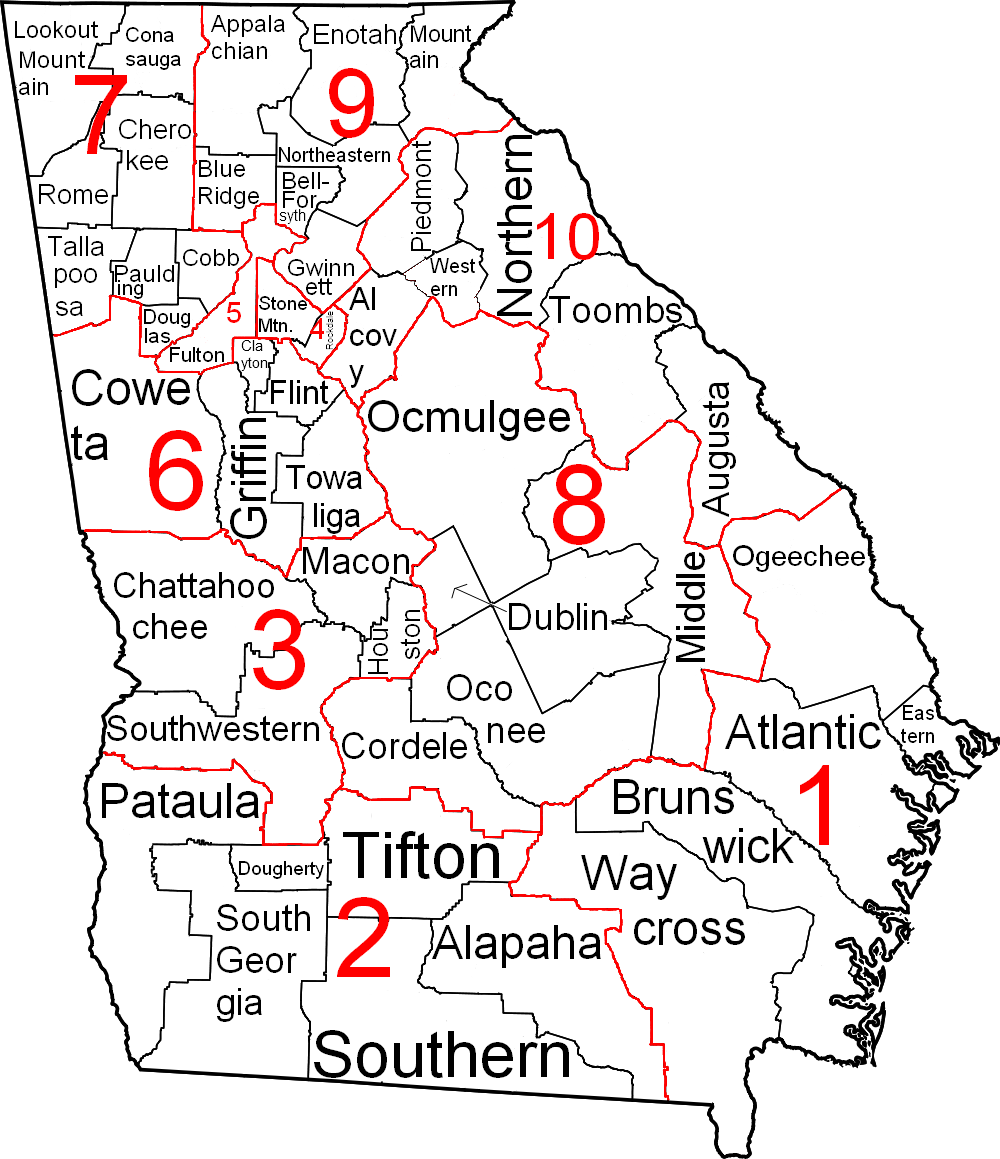
Map of the judicial districts and circuits

The Superior Court is Georgia's general jurisdiction trial court. It has exclusive, constitutional, authority over felony cases, divorce, equity and cases regarding title to land. The exclusive jurisdiction of this court also covers such matters as declaratory judgments, habeas corpus, mandamus, quo warranto and prohibition. The Superior Court corrects errors made by lower courts by issuing writs of certiorari; for some lower courts, the right to direct review by the Superior Court applies.

== Organization ==
Georgia has 159 counties, each with its own Superior Court. As of 2015, these are organized into 49 named Judicial Circuits, which are further collected into ten numbered Judicial Administrative Districts. The circuits and districts are administrative groupings and do not hear appeals, as the Georgia Court of Appeals is a single statewide court.

The ten Judicial Administrative Districts were created by the Judicial Administration Act of 1976, and were based on Congressional district boundaries at the time they were created, but do not subsequently change with Congressional redistricting.

A single judge may serve more than one county. A chief judge handles the administrative tasks for each circuit.

There is also a business court in the Fulton County (Atlanta) Superior Court, the Metro Atlanta Business Case Division. This business court track was originally created in 2005 by the judges of the Fulton County Superior Court as approved by Georgia's Supreme Court, via Judicial Circuit Rule 1004. The Business Case Division is distinct from the later constitutionally created Georgia State-wide Business Court. The constitutional amendment creating the State-wide Business Court in 2018, expressly provides authority for the Metro Atlanta Business Case Division's ongoing operation, and for the potential creation of such business case divisions in other local superior and state courts.

== Election of judges ==
Superior Court judges are elected to four-year terms in nonpartisan, circuit-wide races. To qualify as a Superior Court judge, a candidate must be at least 30 years old, a citizen of Georgia for at least three years, and have practiced law for at least seven years. Superior Court judges who have retired and taken senior status may hear cases in any circuit at the request of a local judge, an administrative judge, or the governor.

== See also ==
- Judiciary of Georgia (U.S. state)
