= Georgia State-wide Business Court =

In 2018, voters in the U.S. state of Georgia approved a constitutional amendment to create a business court for all of Georgia. After an enabling statute to create the Georgia State-wide Business Court was enacted in 2019, the court became operational in 2020.

== History ==
In November 2017, the State of Georgia Court Reform Council issued a report to Georgia's Governor Nathan Deal recommending creation of a statewide business court, with jurisdiction over matters involving a wide range of business and commercial disputes. Among the many case types listed, such as contracts and business torts, there are also specific references to disputes involving antitrust law, intellectual property law, cybersecurity and biotechnology, as well as international arbitration disputes.

Among other things, the report considered the success of the Metro Atlanta Business Case Division (associated with the Fulton County Superior Court) in making its recommendation for a statewide court, and concluded that creating a new statewide court as a distinct court, and not a sub-division of an existing court, required amending Georgia's Constitution.

Article VI of Georgia's Constitution was amended in 2018 to create a statewide business court, with the final approval being given by Georgia's voters. In 2019, the law creating the Georgia State-wide Business Court went into effect, and the court became operational in 2020.

== Details ==
The State-wide Business Court has the authority to hear seventeen types of cases listed in the governing statute, with the powers of a court of equity over all of those case types. If those case types only involve claims for money damages, however, the claim must be worth at least $1,000,000 if it involves commercial real property, or at least $500,000 for those permitted case types not involving disputes over commercial real property.

The court may be located in Atlanta or Macon-Bibb County, but its jurisdiction is statewide. This law establishing the State-wide Business Court's existence and jurisdiction makes clear that the Metro Atlanta Business Case Division may continue to separately exist, and other Georgia superior courts or state courts may have the ability to create business court divisions.

All parties to a case must consent to the State-wide Business Court's jurisdiction. A party may request a jury trial.

The State-wide Business Court has its own rules and forms. It has only one judge and one division. The judge is appointed by the Governor, subject to certain legislative approvals. By contrast, under Article VI, Section VII, of Georgia's constitution, superior and state court judges are elected. As of 2022, the State-wide Business Court judge is paid $174,500, the same as a Court of Appeals judge, whereas Georgia's (trial level) superior court judges are paid $126,265.

Walter W. Davis was appointed as the first State-wide Business Court judge in 2019. The current State-wide Business Court judge (as of June 2024) is William Grady Hamrick, III, who replaced Judge Davis and has served since September 2022.
