= Hawaii Technology Development Corporation =

U.S. state government agency

- HTDC
- Formation: 1983; 43 years ago
- Website: http://www.htdc.org/
- Formerly called: High Technology Development Corporation

The Hawaii Technology Development Corporation (HTDC) is a state agency created in 1983 to foster the development of Hawaii's technology industry.

== Naming ==
The HTDC was established as the High Technology Development Corporation in 1983, but renamed in 2017 to more accurately describe its mission.

== Responsibilities ==
The HTDC is in charge of Hawaii's Small Business Innovation and Research (SIBR) grants which provides funding to develop new technology that was started in 1988.

== History ==
In May 2019, the HTDC partnered with BoxJelly to build the Entrepreneurs Sandbox, a co-working and entrepreneurship hub in Honolulu.

In January 2019, Len Higashi was named acting director after Robbie Melton stepped down from her almost five-year tenure as director and CEO.

In 2018, the HTDC lost ~$800,000 of income when the Manoa Innovation Center went back under control of University of Hawaii.

== The Cyber Security and First Responder Tech Park ==
In 2017, the HTDC faced criticism for its plans to build a 150-acre industrial park focused on first-responders called the Cyber Security and First Responder Tech Park. The plans for the park allocated the Hawaii Office of Enterprise Technology Services about 4 percent of the park's total built area and about 5 percent for the HTDC itself. The park, which is to be built near an NSA office, is the brainchild of Hawaii Sen. Donovan Dela Cruz.
