= Courts of Virginia =

Courts of Virginia include:

State courts of Virginia

- Supreme Court of Virginia
  - Court of Appeals of Virginia
    - Virginia Circuit Court (120 courts divided among 31 judicial circuits)
      - Virginia General District Court (courts in 32 districts)
      - Virginia Juvenile and Domestic Relations District Court (courts in 32 districts)

Federal courts located in Virginia

- United States Court of Appeals for the Fourth Circuit (headquartered in Richmond, having jurisdiction over the United States District Courts of Maryland, North Carolina, South Carolina, Virginia, and West Virginia)
- United States District Court for the Eastern District of Virginia
- United States District Court for the Western District of Virginia

Former federal courts of Virginia

- United States District Court for the District of Virginia (extinct, subdivided)
- United States District Court for the District of Potomac (1801-1802; also contained the District of Columbia and pieces of Maryland; extinct, reorganized)

== See also ==
- Judiciary of Virginia
