= United States District Court for the District of Potomac =

Defunct United States federal court

- Defunct
- Established: February 13, 1801
- Abolished: March 8, 1802

The United States District Court for the District of Potomac was a short-lived United States federal court. Named for the Potomac River, it had jurisdiction over the District of Columbia and pieces of Maryland and Virginia, making it the first (and one of the only) United States district courts to cross state lines. It was established in the Judiciary Act of 1801 – also known as the "Midnight Judges Act", because it sought to redistrict the federal courts to allow outgoing President John Adams to make additional appointments – and was abolished in the Judiciary Act of 1802. The language of the first Judiciary Act, setting forth the geographic jurisdiction of the District, was as follows:

And a new district shall be established, in the districts of Maryland and Virginia, to consist of the territory of Columbia, of all that part of the district of Maryland, which lies west and southwest of the river Patuxent, and of the western branch thereof, and south of the line which divides the county of Montgomery in the last mentioned district, from the county of Frederick, and of a line to be drawn from the termination of the last mentioned line, a northeast course to the western branch of the Patuxent; and of all that part of the district of Virginia, which lies north of the river Rappahannock, and east of the line which divides the counties of Fauquier and Loudon, in the last mentioned district from the counties of Fairfax, Prince William, and Stafford; which new district shall be called the district of Potomac, and a district court in and for the same, shall be holden at Alexandria, by the district judge of the district of Maryland, on the first Tuesday in April, and the first Tuesday in October, in each and every year.

== See also ==
- Courts of Maryland
- Courts of Virginia
- List of courts of the District of Columbia
