= Hawaii state family court =

The Hawaii State family courts are the family courts in the state court system of Hawaii.

They have exclusive jurisdiction over cases involving legal minors, such as juvenile delinquency, status offenses, abuse and neglect, termination of parental rights, adoption, guardianships and detention among others. The family courts also oversee cases of domestic relations involving divorce, child support, and custody matters.Additionally, if it is assessed that a defendant is less than eighteen years old during the prosecution of a criminal charge, that court must transfer the case to family court, rather than try them as an adult. Like other district-level courts, decisions from family courts can be appealed by the intermediate appellate court. Should the case in question involve custody of a minor, this appeal will be fast-tracked to the earliest possible time.

Each district family judge must reside in the circuit where they work, and must have worked as an attorney for at least five years. At the age of 70, judges must retire. The chief justice of the State Supreme Court selects a candidate from a list of at least six names compiled by the Judicial Selection Commission, and the selected candidate is then confirmed by the State Senate of Hawaii. The Court can remove a judge if necessary for the public good, or if the caseload of the court is too low to warrant the continued service of a judge.

As is the case with the Supreme Court of Hawaii and other state-level courts, retired family court justices are allowed to temporarily serve on any district family court, at the request of the presiding chief justice. This rule is stated in the Constitution of Hawaii. The Judicial Selection Commission, in turn, consists of nine members. Two are appointed by the governor, the president of the senate, the speaker of the house, and the Hawaii Bar Association, respectively. One member is appointed by the chief justice of the Supreme Court.

The chief justice of a circuit court can allow any district judge to act as a district family judge, and likewise, designate a family judge to be a district judge. The chief justice can also temporarily order a district judge (family or otherwise) from any circuit to serve in any court in any other circuit.

The first circuit, operating on Oahu, offers specialized services, including juvenile client services, juvenile and family drug court, Hawai’i girls court, and “zero to three” court (which provides support for cases involving children from birth to three years of age). Temporary restraining orders for family members or intimate partners can be filed through the family court’s adult services branch, which also retains two criminal misdemeanor units. Other circuits have programs as well, such as Kids First, a mandatory training programs for divorced parents. In May, 2023, the third circuit (which covers Hawaii Island) launched the Rural Paternity Advocate Pilot Project, which lets attorney-supervised paternity advocates assist low-income rural citizens.

A peacemaking program known as the Na’au Pono Demonstration project aims to offer traditional conciliatory practices to Native Hawaiian clients. In 1994, the Na’au Pono Demonstration project began taking referrals from the Family Court of the First Circuit. In recent years, the family courts have recognized a native Hawaiian guided meditation practice known as Ho’oponopono as a legitimate form of conflict resolution.

Family courts, due to the sensitive nature of their cases, are often closed to the public. Similarly, Hawaii’s Sunshine Law, a policy meant to open up government proceedings and meetings to public scrutiny, does not apply to family courts or other sections of the judiciary.

== See also ==
- Courts of Hawaii
