= Hawaii Tax Appeal Court =

Appellate court in Hawaii, US

The Hawaii State Tax Appeal Court is part of the Hawaii State Judiciary.

A taxpayer or county may appeal a real property tax assessment from a board of review.

It has jurisdiction over cases involving property, excise, liquor, tobacco, income, and insurance taxes.

== See also ==
- Courts of Hawaii
