= Hawaii Land Court =

Court with jurisdiction over Hawaii land titles

The Land Court of the State of Hawaiʻi (originally, the Court of Land Registration in the former U.S. Territory of Hawaii) has exclusive jurisdiction in the Hawaiʻi State Judiciary over cases involving registered land titles. The Land Court system of land registration was created by statute in 1903 as a Torrens system of land titles.

Registration of land in Land Court is optional in Hawaii; non-registered land is conveyed in the "Regular System" instead, by recording deeds or other documents in the Bureau of Conveyances. Land in the Regular System may be lost by adverse possession (including squatter's rights, encroachments, and public trespassing) but land with registered title cannot be lost by adverse possession or other prescriptive means. "'No title, right or interest in, to or across registered land in derogation of that of the registered owner shall be acquired by prescription or adverse possession'. Thus is the possession of registered land protected. It cannot be interrupted by an adverse entry."

In order to register a parcel of land in Land Court for the first time, an application with supporting documents proving good title is filed with the court. If successful, the Land Court issues an Original Certificate of Title, and issues Transfer Certificates of Title for all subsequent valid transfers. Notice of liens, mortgages, long-term leases, easements, servitudes or other encumbrances on the land is recorded on the Certificate of Title.

The application is formally a legal case in a court of record, with required notice to all affected persons, and rights of appeal. Registered title to land is guaranteed by the State (and a special trust fund) to be solid ("good against the whole world") and is rarely challenged. Original applications to register new land parcels have become rare in Hawaii in recent years. It is possible, under a Hawaii statute, to take land out of the Land Court system into the Regular System.

The Land Court staff certifies transfers of land title under the Torrens system; the court presides over disputed titles and rights to registered land. The Land Court is administered by a Registrar, an Assistant Registrar, and the Judge of the Land Court, who is a judge of the First Circuit (Honolulu) assigned to the Land Court.

On Lānai Island, almost all land has been registered in Land Court, while very little of nearby Molokai Island is registered. Palmyra Island was registered in Land Court in 1912, and land parcels there were subdivided and transferred in that system until 1959, when the rest of the Territory of Hawaii, excluding Palmyra and the Stewart Islands, became the State of Hawaii (Hawaii Admission Act). The Land Court became a state court and lost jurisdiction over Palmyra land because Palmyra was left out of the new state, as the remnant of the old federal Territory. (Since 1962, Palmyra land transfers are recorded by the court clerk of the United States District Court for the District of Hawaii.)

== See also ==
- Courts of Hawaii
