= Hawaii state district court =

Level of state court in Hawaii

The Hawaii state district courts are a level of state courts in Hawaii.

In addition, the district courts have jurisdiction over:

- Civil cases with an amount in controversy not in excess of $25,000 or where the relief sought is specific performance valued under $25,000. The district courts have exclusive jurisdiction where the amount in controversy or relief sought is under $10,000 and small-claims cases where the amount claimed does not exceed $3,500.
- Exclusive jurisdiction over traffic infractions and most Landlord–tenant disputes, including summary possession/ejection (eviction) cases regardless of the amount of the claim
- Misdemeanor criminal offenses punishable by fine or by imprisonment not in excess of one year
- Cases arising from the violations of a county ordinance.
- Petitions for restraining orders for relief from and for injunctions against harassment

The Hawai'i State Small Claims court is a division of the district courts. Its primary purview is civil cases in which the amount in controversy is $3,500 or less. If the party being sued counterclaims against the plaintiff bringing the suit, the small claims court will still retain jurisdiction if the counterclaim is $25,000 or less.

The small claims court also has jurisdiction over all returns of residential security deposits from landlords, regardless of amount; returns of leased or rented personal property, where the property is worth $3,500 or less and where the rental amount claimed does not exceed $3,500; and suits to recover damages or repossess items stolen from business property, such as shopping carts, shopping baskets, or other similar devices.

The advantage of the small claims process is that it is informal. However, a disadvantage is that the decision of the judge is final and there is no right to appeal.

== See also ==
- Courts of Hawaii
