= Kotohira Jinsha v. McGrath =

- Court: United States District Court for the District of Hawaii
- Full case name: Kotohira Jinsha v. McGrath, Attorney General
- Decided: June 5, 1950
- Citation: 90 F.Supp. 892

Holding
- Infringement of the First Amendment by the Federal Government. The Federal Government had no basis to use the Trading with the Enemy Act. Return of property seized by the Federal Government.

Court membership
- Judge sitting: J. Frank McLaughlin

Kotohira Jinsha v. McGrath, Attorney General,. (90 F. Supp. 892) was a District court case allowing Shinto shrines to reopen following World War II.

== Background ==
Kotohira Jinsha Shrine was established in Honolulu, Hawaii in 1924.

December 7, 1941, the Empire of Japan attacked Pearl Harbor; thereafter practice of Shinto was banned by martial law; throughout the war clergy are deported to Japan or transferred to the U.S. mainland.

October 24, 1944, martial law was lifted in Hawaii.

September 2, 1945, Japan surrenders and World War II is over.

December 15, 1945, Shinto Directive abolishes State Shinto, Japan’s state religion.

April 6, 1946, without a clergy, the remaining ministry closes Kotohira Jinsha.

== Case ==
December 31, 1947, with declining tensions towards Japanese tradition, Shintos reopen Kotohira Jinsha despite the absence of a clergy.

June 1, 1948, federal officers raided the shrine under the Trading with the Enemy Act the seize the Kotohira Jinsha property and making arrests.

March 4, 1949, the Federal Government announces the sale of the seized Kotohira Jinsha property.

April 4, 1949, Kotohira Jinsha reacted by hiring law firm, Robertson, Castle & Anthony.

March 31, 1949, Kotohira Jinsha files lawsuit against the Attorney General’s office (held by J. Howard McGrath) for misusing Section 9 of the Trading with the Enemy Act against a civilian organization and not under the influence of the Japanese government.

March 27, 1950, The trial started and ended on May 17, 1950.

May 18, 1950, Judge J. Frank McLaughlin ruled in favor of the plaintiffs, Kotohira Jinsha.

=== Judge ===
J. Frank McLaughlin

=== Plaintiffs ===
Robertson, Castle & Anthony

- Joseph G. Anthony
- Frank D. Padgett

=== Defendants ===
Attorney General’s office

- Ray J. O'Brien
- Leon R. Gross
- Howard K. Hoddick

== Conclusion ==
Judge McLaughlin found the Attorney General’s office in violation of the First Amendment rights of plaintiffs in the United States Constitution with reference to Robert H. Jackson in American Communications Association v. Douds.

Judge J. Frank McLaughlin found the Attorney General’s office had no basis on which to exercise the Trading with the Enemy Act, moreover since 1945 Japan had abolished state religion under Douglas MacArthur and by judicial order return seized property to Kotohira Jinsha.

== Results ==
Kotohira Jinsha Shrine reopened almost immediately after the case that year. After relocating a second time in 1962 to make way for the H1 Freeway (the first time in 1931) to its current location.

The successful case demonstrated the possibility for other Japanese-based organizations perceived as being wronged by the United States to go to court.

In 2010 the Ground Zero mosque controversy over Park51 near the World Trade Center site, in comparison between the Attack on Pearl Harbor and September 11 attacks, renewed interest Kotohira in Jinsha v. McGrath arose as a counterpart for Park51.
