= Jech =

Jech (feminine: Jechová) is a Czech surname. Notable people with the surname include:

- Ctibor Jech, Czech ice hockey player
- Darcy Jech
- Jiří Jech (born 1975), Czech football referee
- Josef Jech
- Thomas Jech (born 1944), mathematician

== See also ==
- Jech Doab
- Jech v. Burch (1979), US federal district court case
