= Judge McLaughlin =

Judge McLaughlin may refer to:

- Charles F. McLaughlin (1887–1976), judge of the United States District Court for the District of Columbia
- Gerald McLaughlin (1893–1977), judge of the United States Court of Appeals for the Third Circuit
- Joseph Frank McLaughlin (1908–1962), judge of the United States District Court for the District of Hawaii
- Joseph M. McLaughlin (1933–2013), judge of the United States Court of Appeals for the Second Circuit
- Linda Hodge McLaughlin (1942–1999), judge of the United States District Court for the Central District of California
- Mary A. McLaughlin (born 1946), judge of the United States District Court for the Eastern District of Pennsylvania
- Sean J. McLaughlin (born 1955), judge of the United States District Court for the Western District of Pennsylvania

== See also ==
- Beverley McLachlin (born 1943), chief justice of Canada
