= Randall Roth =

American lawyer

- Born: May 14, 1948; Ellinwood, Kansas
- Occupation: Law Professor/Scholar
- Known for: Scholarship In Trusts & Estates

Randall Roth is a former law professor at the William S. Richardson School of Law at University of Hawaiʻi at Mānoa and a trusts and estates expert. The Honolulu Star-Bulletin identified him as one of the "100 Who Made A Difference" in the state since statehood, and Honolulu Magazine recognized his work, specifically on Broken Trust, as one of the "50 turning points" in the state's history.

== Background ==
Born in Ellinwood, Kansas, Roth graduated with a B.S. in economics and accounting from Regis University in Denver, Colorado in 1970. He later earned his Juris Doctor from University of Denver College of Law in 1974 and his LLM from University of Miami School of Law in 1975. In 1982, he moved to Hawaiʻi, where he has lived since.

Roth is married to his wife, Susan, and they have four children.

== Scholarship ==
Roth has both written and consulted on legal issues concerning trusts and estates.

In 2011, he was the legal advisor for The Descendants, consulting on such issues. Starring George Clooney as Matt King, a Honolulu-based lawyer and the sole trustee of a family trust that controls 25,000 acres of pristine land on the island of Kauaʻi, the film forces King to confront the realities of balancing the family's long-held interest in protecting the land with selling it to a developer.

=== The Price of Paradise ===
In 1992 and 1993, Roth co-authored a series of best-selling books called The Price of Paradise. In them, he coined the term "Paradise Tax," a term now widely used to denote the differential in the cost of living in the United States Mainland versus Hawaiʻi. He attributed the "Paradise Tax" to multiple factors including differences in regulation, land use, land availability, and shipping costs.

=== Broken Trust ===
Further Information: Kamehameha Schools Controversies

In 2006, Broken Trust: Greed, Mismanagement and Political Manipulation at America's Largest Charitable Trust, co-authored by Roth and Samuel Pailthorpe King, a Judge for United States District Court for the District of Hawaii, chronicled the controversies that had enveloped Hawaiʻi's Bishop Estate, one of the nation's largest trusts, estimated to be valued by the Wall Street Journal at nearly $10 billion. Established by the Hawaiian Princess, Bernice Pauahi Bishop, in a trust before her death in 1884, the Estate was entrusted with running Kamehameha Schools, a private college preparatory school dedicated to educating Native Hawaiian youth.

In the best-seller, he exposed how the Estate had been corrupted by the state's political apparatus and its trustees for their personal use at the expense of Kamehameha; a group of trustees who included, among others, Hawaii Supreme Court justices and prominent politicians; trustees were earning salaries of nearly $950,000 for their work as such.
