= David Alan Ezra =

American judge (born 1947)

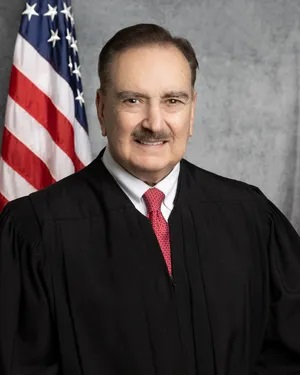

Senior Judge of the United States District Court for the District of Hawaii (Note: Since taking senior status, Ezra has sat with the United States District Court for the Western District of Texas)
- Incumbent
- Assumed office June 27, 2012

Chief Judge of the United States District Court for the District of Hawaii
- In office 1999–2005
- Preceded by: Alan Cooke Kay
- Succeeded by: Helen W. Gillmor

Judge of the United States District Court for the District of Hawaii
- In office May 20, 1988 – June 27, 2012
- Appointed by: Ronald Reagan
- Preceded by: Samuel Pailthorpe King
- Succeeded by: Derrick Watson

Personal details
- Born: June 27, 1947 (age 79) Columbus, Ohio, U.S.
- Education: St. Mary's University (BBA, JD)

David Alan Ezra (born June 27, 1947) is a senior United States district judge of the United States District Court for the District of Hawaii. Since January 2013, Ezra has been designated by the Chief Justice of the United States to serve on the United States District Court for the Western District of Texas, San Antonio and Austin Divisions to help ease the heavy workload for the federal judges in Texas. Judge Ezra is often designated to sit on the United States Court of Appeals for the Ninth Circuit where he holds the record for the most designated sittings of any judge in that Court’s history.

== Early life and education ==
Born in Columbus, Ohio, Ezra’s family moved to Hawaii when he was quite young and he grew up in Hawaii. Ezra graduated from St. Louis High School in Honolulu and received a Bachelor of Business Administration from St. Mary's University magna cum laude in 1969, followed by a Juris Doctor from St. Mary's University School of Law in 1972, where he graduated first in his class. He served in the US Marine Corps from 1966-1968. He also served as a commissioned officer in the United States Army from 1971 to 1976.

== Career ==
Ezra was in private practice in Honolulu, Hawaii from 1972 to 1988, becoming a partner in the law firm of Anthony, Hoddick, Reinwald, and O'Connor in 1980. Ezra became the Managing Partner of the law firm of Ezra, O'Connor, Moon and Tam in 1981. He was an adjunct professor of law at the William S. Richardson School of Law from 1978 to 2013. He has been the jurist in residence at St. Mary’s University School of Law since 2016.

Ezra is a member of both the Hawaii and Texas Bars.

=== Federal judicial service ===
On November 18, 1987, Ezra was nominated by President Ronald Reagan to a seat on the United States District Court for the District of Hawaii vacated by Judge Samuel Pailthorpe King. Ezra was unanimously confirmed by the United States Senate on May 19, 1988, and received his commission on May 20, 1988. He served as chief judge from 1999 to 2005.

Ezra was the youngest federal judge ever appointed to the District of Hawaii and the first federal judge from Hawaii to be elected to the Judicial Conference of the United States. Ezra also served as Secretary, Vice President, and President of the District Judges Association of the Ninth Circuit and served multiple terms on the Ninth Circuit Judicial Council. He also served as Vice President of the Federal Judges Association and remains a member of the Board of Directors. Ezra was appointed and served on the Judicial Conference Committee on the Administration of the Bankruptcy System and was its long range planning chairman. In 2010 Ezra was appointed to the Council on Budget and Finance of the Judicial Conference of the United States. In 2023 Ezra was appointed to the Committee which oversees Oscar, the federal judicial law clerk hiring system. Ezra continues to be designated to serve on federal courts both within and outside the Ninth Circuit, particularly in complex cases, and is often designated to sit on the Ninth Circuit Court of Appeals where he holds the record for the most designated sittings of any judge in that Court’s history. He assumed senior status on June 27, 2012, having served as an active judge in regular service longer than any other judge in Hawaii history. Ezra continues to carry a full caseload.

Ezra was awarded the University of Hawaii Lifetime Achievement Award; the St. Mary’s University Lifetime Achievement Award; The St. Mary’s University School of Law Rosewood Gavel Award; The Federal Bar of Austin, Texas “Judge David Alan Ezra” Extraordinary Achievement Award which they named after him.

In January 2013, Ezra was designated by the Chief Justice John Roberts to the Western District of Texas, San Antonio and Austin Divisions, to help ease the heavy workload for the federal judges in that state. Ezra maintains chambers and courtrooms in both San Antonio and Austin, but does the bulk of his court work in Austin, Texas.

In September 2023, Ezra ruled that a controversial floating border barrier in the Rio Grande River violates federal law and must be removed. Texas Governor Greg Abbott had ordered deployment of the floating barrier in July as part of Operation Lone Star, his multibillion-dollar effort to fight illegal immigration and smuggling at the U.S.-Mexico border.

Ezra presided over United States v. Texas, a legal challenge to Texas Senate Bill 4 which empowers state and local police officers to arrest migrants who cross from Mexico without authorization. Ezra struck down S.B. 4 in February 2024, and the 5th circuit affirmed Ezra's ruling on March 26, 2024.

In October 2025, Ezra issued a preliminary injunction blocking the enforcement of the Texas Senate Bill 2972, finding its restrictions on campus speech and protests likely violated the First Amendment.

== Sources ==
Legal offices
Preceded by Samuel Pailthorpe King	Judge of the United States District Court for the District of Hawaii; 1988–2012	Succeeded by Derrick Watson
Preceded by Alan Cooke Kay	Chief Judge of the United States District Court for the District of Hawaii; 1999–2005	Succeeded by Helen W. Gillmor
