= Jech v. Burch =

- Court: United States District Court for the District of Hawaii
- Full case name: Alena Jech, Adolf Befurt and Adrian Jebef, by his next friend, Alena Jech v. Thomas A. Burch and George A. Yuen
- Decided: February 21, 1979
- Docket nos.: Civ. No. 77-0244
- Citation: 466 F. Supp. 714

Court membership
- Judge sitting: Samuel King

Jech v. Burch, 466 F. Supp. 714 (D. Haw. 1979), was a United States federal district court case that in its ruling affirmed the constitutional right of parents to name their children as they wish.

The case was started when the parents of a newborn child gave the child a last name different from the father's name and different from the mother's name. The State of Hawaii, through Thomas A. Burch, Chief of the Research and Statistics Office of the State Department of Health and George A. L. Yuen, Director of Health, State of Hawaii, contended that Hawaii statutes required that the surname of a child born in wedlock be the surname of the father, or the hyphenated surnames of the mother and father in either order. The parents (Alena Jech and Adolf Befurt) and the child (Adrian Jebef, through his next friend, his mother) sued the two Hawaii officials to force them to have the surname they chose to appear on the birth certificate.

The court found that "parents have a common law right to give their child any name they wish, and that the Fourteenth Amendment protects this right from arbitrary state action." In deciding what cause would be sufficient for the state to interfere with this right, the court quoted Mr. Justice McReynolds who wrote

The established doctrine is that this liberty may not be interfered with, under the guise of protecting the public interest, by legislative action which is arbitrary or without reasonable relation to some purpose within the competency of the State to effect.

The court found the state's claim of a reasonable purpose ludicrous:

The State argues that it is necessary to name and register children as presently done in order to trace relationships for purposes of determining devolution of property and title to lands. There may have been a day when this argument had some validity. Today it is ludicrous. A person does not have to be born in Hawaii to inherit property in Hawaii or from a citizen of Hawaii. Nor does the present indexing system recover the names of all of one's heirs who are born in Hawaii.

The court found that the "Plaintiffs have a Constitutionally protected right to give their own child any surname they choose" and to the extent the state statute "prohibits the exercise of this right, the statute is unconstitutional."
