= Joseph Frank McLaughlin =

American judge

J. Frank McLaughlin
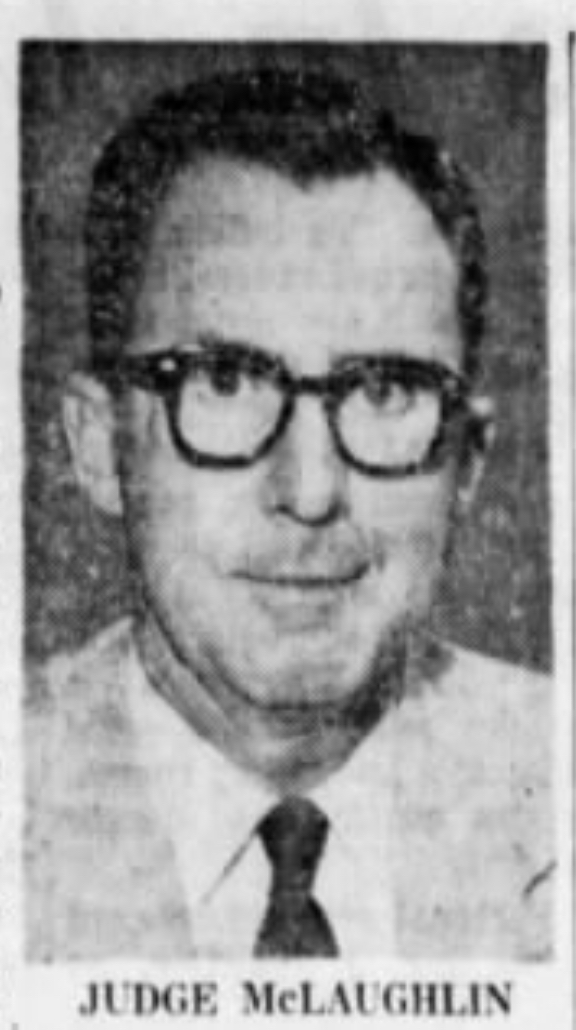

Chief Judge of the United States District Court for the District of Hawaii
- In office September 5, 1951 – March 17, 1959
- Preceded by: Delbert E. Metzger

Judge of the United States District Court for the District of Hawaii
- In office 1943 – March 17, 1959
- Appointed by: President Franklin D. Roosevelt
- Preceded by: Ingram M. Stainback

Personal details
- Born: Joseph Francis McLaughlin; June 7, 1908 Leominster, Worcester County, Massachusetts, U.S.
- Died: October 25, 1962 (aged 54) Honolulu, Hawaii, U.S.
- Education: Dartmouth College (BA); Harvard University (JD)

Joseph Francis McLaughlin (June 7, 1908 – October 25, 1962) was a United States district judge of the United States District Court for the District of Hawaii in the Territory of Hawaii.

== Early life and education ==
Born in Leominster, Massachusetts, J. Frank McLaughlin grew up in Worcester, Massachusetts, graduating from Saint John's High School in 1926. He received a Bachelor of Arts from Dartmouth College in 1930, followed by a Juris Doctor from Harvard Law School in 1933.

== Career ==
After graduating from a Harvard Law School, McLaughlin was in private practice in Whitinsville, Massachusetts from 1933 to 1935. He worked for a year in the United States Justice Department in Washington, D.C. and arrived in the Territory of Hawaii in 1936.

J. Frank served as the Assistant U.S. Attorney assigned to the United States District Court in Honolulu, Hawaii, where he worked with future Hawaii Governor Ingram M. Stainback.

In 1939, McLaughlin became a judge on the former 4th Circuit territorial court in Hilo.

== Federal judicial service ==
In 1942, McLaughlin was nominated by President Franklin D. Roosevelt to a seat on the United States District Court for the District of Hawaii vacated by Judge Ingram M. Stainback. He was confirmed by the United States Senate in 1943.

== Notable cases ==
- Ex Parte White, 66 F. Supp. 982 (D. Haw. 1944)

On August 20, 1942, stockbroker Harry E. White, a civilian, “unconnected with the armed forces of the United States,” was arrested for embezzlement. He was tried and convicted by a U.S. Army judge in a military provost court and was sentenced to five years (reduced to four) in an Oahu prison. Judge J. Frank McLaughlin granted his writ of Habeas Corpus and ordered White’s release without bond.

Judge McLaughlin argued that White was deprived of his constitutional rights under the Fifth and Sixth Amendments. McLaughlin stated that there was no justification for suspending the Bill of Rights. There was no military necessity that warranted White’s trial, conviction, and sentence in a military court.

Following the Japanese attack on Pearl Harbor on December 7, 1941, the Territory of Hawaii was placed under martial law and the writ of Habeas Corpus was suspended, along with other court functions. But after the United States Navy’s victory in the Battle of Midway there was no threat of a land invasion by early June, 1942, preceding Harry White’s arrest. So McLaughlin believed that there was no justification for martial law continuing in this United States Territory.

Judge McLaughlin outlined the Organic Act and how Governor Joseph Poindexter transferred powers to the army, which was beyond his powers to do. In an unprecedented move, U.S. Army General Delos C. Emmons issued general orders prohibiting the Habeas Corpus proceedings in the federal court and threatened the United States District Court and its judges over this issue.

Citing Ex parte Milligan, Judge McLaughlin wrote in his Opinion, “War does not suspend the Constitution, or any part of it. It is the supreme law of the land at all times. Neither generals, governors, nor courts are exempt from its provisions at any time.”

This was later adjoined to the United States Supreme Court case, Duncan v. Kahanamoku.

- Ex Parte Spurlock, 66 F. Supp. 997 (D. Haw. 1944)

Shortly after Pearl Harbor, Hawaii was put under martial law. There were two federal judges when Hawaii was a territory — Judge Delbert Metzger and J. Frank McLaughlin. Both judges upheld and defended the Writ of Habeas Corpus during this period. Fred L. Spurlock, an African American civilian, was arrested by Military Police and sentenced by a military provost judge.

A writ of Habeas Court was issued and Federal Judge J. Frank McLaughlin had Spurlock released. McLaughlin condemned the army’s sentence and trial in his written opinion.

Lt. General Robert C. Richardson Jr. threatened to jail both Judge Metzger and McLaughlin if they continued with these habeas corpus cases.

This case became a companion case to one of Judge Metzger’s cases that went to the U.S. Supreme Court. The Supreme Court, acknowledged the facts of the case, but ultimately it was determined that their ruling wouldn’t matter because the war had ended, along with martial law.

- Alesna v. Rice, 74 F. Supp. 865 (D. Haw. 1947)
- Kaname Fujino v. Clark, 71 F. Supp. 1 (D. Haw. 1947)
- Miyuki Okihara v. Clark, 71 F. Supp. 319 (D. Haw. 1947)
- Duze v. Woolley, 72 F. Supp. 422 (D. Haw. 1947)
- Hawaiian Tuna Packers v. INTERNATIONAL L. AND W. UNION, 72 F. Supp. 562 (D. Haw. 1947)
- Hall v. Hawaiian Pineapple Co., 72 F. Supp. 533 (D. Haw. 1947)
- United States v. 257.654 ACRES OF LAND, ETC., 72 F. Supp. 903 (D. Haw. 1947)
- Hawaiian Airlines v. Trans-Pacific Airlines, 73 F. Supp. 68 (D. Haw. 1947)
- Oahu Ry. & Land Co. v. United States, 73 F. Supp. 707 (D. Haw. 1947)
- Alesna v. Rice, 74 F. Supp. 865 (D. Haw. 1947)
- Kam Koon Wan v. EE Black, Limited, 75 F. Supp. 553 (D. Haw. 1948)
- Wilscam v. United States, 76 F. Supp. 581 (D. Haw. 1948)
- Hawaiian Airlines v. Trans-Pacific Airlines, 78 F. Supp. 1 (D. Haw. 1948)
- United States v. Hughes Tool Co., 78 F. Supp. 409 (D. Haw. 1948)
- Ex Parte Mulvaney, 82 F. Supp. 743 (D. Haw. 1949)
- Ishikawa v. Acheson, 85 F. Supp. 1 (D. Haw. 1949)
- United States v. Inter-Island Steam Nav. Co., 87 F. Supp. 1010 (D. Haw. 1950)
- Kotohira Jinsha v. McGrath, 90 F. Supp. 892 (D. Haw. 1950)

On June 1, 1948, U.S. Government officials raided and seized the Kotohira Jinsha Shrine under the Trading with the Enemy Act, and announced its sale the following year. Representatives for Kotohira Jinsha filed a lawsuit contending that the shrine had been wrongfully seized.

Senator J. Howard McGrath of Rhode Island was the Attorney General of the United States appointed by President Harry Truman in 1949. The lawsuit against the Attorney General's office became Kotohira Jinsha vs. McGrath.

The trial was held on May 17, 1950. Recent Harvard Law School graduate (Class of 1948) and future Hawaii Supreme Court Justice, Frank D. Padgett, argued his first case on behalf of the shrine.

The following day, Judge McLaughlin, citing the First Amendment, ruled in favor of the plaintiffs, Kotohira Jinsha. McLaughlin ordered that their property be returned to them, and rebuked the actions of Attorney General McGrath and the Federal Government.

In his opinion Judge McLaughlin stated, "The undisguised fact is that this plaintiff's property was vested taken away because what plaintiff believes in was disliked or suspected, and by taking away its base of operations, its fervor for its beliefs would tend to diminish and eventually vanish. Not until the evidence was concluded was I willing to even listen to argument on this point, for I could not believe it. I still do not believe the Attorney General really acted on such a basis even though such evidence as the Court was given might so indicate."

"We have not yet come to the point nor will we ever while "this Court [also] sits" where the Government can take away a person's property because it does not approve of what that person believes in or teaches by way of religion or philosophy of life. The First Amendment forbids."

- United States v. Fujimoto, 101 F. Supp. 293 (D. Haw. 1951)
- Hisao Murata v. Acheson, 99 F. Supp. 591 (D. Haw. 1951)
- Kiyokuro Okimura v. Acheson, 99 F. Supp. 587 (D. Haw. 1951)
- PETITION OF PLYWACKI, (D.Hawaii 1952) | 107 F. Supp. 593

Atheist Wladyslaw Plywacki was denied United States citizenship for declining to take the sworn oath of allegiance with the words, "So help me God."

There was an alternative oath for conscientious objectors, but not for atheists. Plywacki (Plywaski) provided his own written affirmation, which the judge rejected as bargaining with the court.

In a later opinion, Judge McLaughlin stated, “Few realize that an affirmation is allowed in lieu of an oath--a swearing-- in deference to a person's religious beliefs and concludes by affirming by reference to a Supreme Being--witness the Society of Friends and Jehovah's Witnesses.” (Plywacki Petition, 115 F. Supp. 613)

In his initial opinion, Judge McLaughlin stated, “No constitutional question of freedom of religion is even remotely involved by an alien atheist seeking naturalization, and the sole question is whether the petitioner believes in all of the principles which delicately support our free government (Petition of Plywacki, 107 F. Supp. 593)

- United States v. Fujimoto, 102 F. Supp. 890 (D. Haw. 1952)
- Kiyokuro Okimura v. Acheson, 111 F. Supp. 303 (D. Haw. 1953)
- PETITION OF PLYWACKI, 115 F. Supp. 613 (D. Hawai'I 1953)
- Castle & Cooke Terminals v. LOCAL 137, ETC., 110 F. Supp. 247 (D. Haw. 1953)
- Kiyokuro Okimura v. Acheson, 111 F. Supp. 303 (D. Haw. 1953)
- Hernandez v. United States, 112 F. Supp. 369 (D. Haw. 1953)
- Waialua Agr. Co. v. United Sugar Workers, 114 F. Supp. 243 (D. Haw. 1953)
- Smith v. United States, 113 F. Supp. 702 (D. Haw. 1953)
- INTERNATIONAL LONGSHORE., ETC. v. Libby, McNeill & Libby, 114 F. Supp. 249 (D. Haw. 1953)
- Daves v. Hawaiian Dredging Co., 114 F. Supp. 643 (D. Haw. 1953)
- Cooke v. United States, 115 F. Supp. 830 (D. Haw. 1953)
- United States v. Ushi Shiroma, 123 F. Supp. 145 (D. Haw. 1954)
- Terada v. Dulles, 121 F. Supp. 6 (D. Haw. 1954)
- Juneau Spruce Corp. v. INTERNATIONAL LONG. & W. UNION, 128 F. Supp. 697 (D. Haw. 1955)
- Richard Gladstein, Petitioner, v. Hon. J. Frank Mclaughlin, As Judge of the United States District Court for the District of Hawaii, Respondent, 230 F.2d 762 (9th Cir. 1955)

This was a petition brought to the U.S. Court of Appeals for the Ninth Circuit on April 8, 1955, by labor attorney, Richard Gladstein against U.S. Judge J. Frank McLaughlin.

The petition for a writ of mandamus or prohibition was decided by Chief Judge William Denman, and Circuit Judges Homer Bone and Walter Lyndon Pope.

Judge McLaughlin ordered attorney Gladstein to show cause why the U.S. District Court in Honolulu should not disbar or suspend him from practice in that court when Gladstein had been jailed for contempt in the trial of United States vs. Dennis in the District Court of the Southern District of New York.

The court’s stated opinion was, “We do not agree that Gladstein should be put to the time and expense of such a proceeding.” The court noted the recent decision on disbarment in the case of In re Isserman, 348 U.S. 1, 75 S. Ct. 6, 99 L. Ed. 3, and that, “the respondent, upon consideration of the above, will refrain from further continuing in the disbarment proceeding.”

The petitioner claimed that the respondent had no jurisdiction to disbar, and that the judge had personal bias and prejudice against Gladstein, which in a hearing on its sufficiency, Judge McLaughlin held it as being insufficient.

In an affidavit of former United States District Judge Delbert Metzger, he wrote that Judge McLaughlin stated to him "that it was questionable if any American lawyer had a right to appear in any United States court and defend a person who was proved to be a member of the Communist Party which Party had been proved in the Dennis case to advocate and teach the overthrow of the government by force and violence; and that in making such an appearance, if the lawyer by misconduct or disrespect to the court was found to be in contempt of court, that lawyer should be disbarred from practice in every United States court of the land."

- Scruggs v. Meredith, 134 F. Supp. 868 (D. Haw. 1955)
- Scruggs v. Meredith, 135 F. Supp. 376 (D. Haw. 1955)
- Dyer v. Kazuhisa Abe, 138 F. Supp. 220 (D. Haw. 1956)

In Dyer v. Kazuhisa Abe, Judge McLaughlin ruled that in certain circumstances the courts should remedy legislative districting issues when the legislature doesn't do this itself. If the rights of the people are hindered or obstructed (actively or inactively) by the legislative body of elected representatives then the only available recourse for the individual is with the courts.

There were several defendants in elected office in the territory that were named in this case, including Daniel K. Inouye, the future U.S. Senator.

The issue arose because of the population shift from other Hawaiian islands to Oahu over the years, resulting in a legislative imbalance that favored rural areas over urban areas.

The Hawaiian Organic Act required periodic legislative reapportionment based on the population of a given area. Judge McLaughlin's ruling addressed the territorial situation under the act, which was brought to the federal court by an Oahu voter. He ruled in Dyer's favor and ordered elections to be held.

This ruling was later overturned by the ninth circuit court of appeals in San Francisco, resulting in the new elections being called off.

In 1962, in Baker v. Carr, the U.S. Supreme Court ruled similarly to Judge McLaughlin. In Justice Douglas's concurring opinion, he quoted Judge McLaughlin and Dyer v. Kazuhisha Abe.

From Baker v. Carr

MR. JUSTICE DOUGLAS, concurring.

As stated by Judge McLaughlin in Dyer v. Kazuhisa Abe, 138 F. Supp. 220, 236 (an apportionment case in Hawaii which was reversed and dismissed as moot, 256 F.2d 728):

"The whole thrust of today's legal climate is to end unconstitutional discrimination. It is ludicrous to preclude judicial relief when a mainspring of representative government is impaired. Legislators have no immunity from the Constitution. The legislatures of our land should be made as responsive to the Constitution of the United States as are the citizens who elect the legislators."

In 1964, the Supreme Court ruled additionally on the apportionment issue in Reynolds v. Sims.

- Mitchell v. Rogers, 138 F. Supp. 214 (D. Haw. 1956)
- Aradanas v. Hogan, 155 F. Supp. 546 (D. Haw. 1957)
- Knox v. Anderson, 159 F. Supp. 795 (D. Haw. 1958)
- UNITED STATES v. REYNOLDS, 169 F.Supp. 479 (1958)

In 1958, anti-nuclear peace activist Earl L. Reynolds sailed with his wife and children on the Phoenix of Hiroshima, into the American nuclear testing zone in the Pacific known as the Pacific Proving Grounds. He was tried by Chief Judge J. Frank McLaughlin and convicted by a jury in the U.S. District Court in Honolulu. He later appealed his sentence and had it overturned by the 9th Circuit Court of Appeals in San Francisco.

- Svedlund v. Pepsi Cola Bottling Co. of Hawaii, 172 F. Supp. 597 (D. Haw. 1959)

== Speeches ==
Judge McLaughlin delivered the 1944 commencement address titled, "The University for Hawaii," at the University of Hawaii in Manoa.

Judge McLaughlin delivered an address in San Francisco to the Circuit Conference of the Ninth Judicial Circuit on June 30, 1950, titled, “The Feudal Law of Hawaii and its Transition into the Common Law of New England.”
