= Samuel Pailthorpe King =

American judge

Samuel King

Senior Judge of the United States District Court for the District of Hawaii
- In office November 30, 1984 – December 7, 2010

Chief Judge of the United States District Court for the District of Hawaii
- In office 1974–1984
- Preceded by: Martin Pence
- Succeeded by: Harold Fong

Judge of the United States District Court for the District of Hawaii
- In office June 28, 1972 – November 30, 1984
- Appointed by: Richard Nixon
- Preceded by: Cyrus Nils Tavares
- Succeeded by: David Alan Ezra

Personal details
- Born: Samuel Pailthorpe King; April 13, 1916 Hankou, China
- Died: December 7, 2010 (aged 94) Honolulu, Hawaii, U.S.
- Party: Republican
- Spouse: Anne van Patten Grilk
- Children: 3
- Parent: Samuel Wilder King (father)
- Relatives: James A. King (grandfather); Leilehua Lanzilotti (grandchild)
- Education: Yale University (BS, LLB)

Samuel Pailthorpe King (April 13, 1916 – December 7, 2010) was an American lawyer and judge. He served as a United States district judge of the United States District Court for the District of Hawaii.

== Life ==
King was born April 13, 1916, in Hankou, China while his father was in the United States Navy. His grandfather was ship captain and politician James A. King (1832–1899). He lost his left eye as a child of about six. After the family returned to Hawaii, he attended and graduated from Punahou School. His mother, Pauline Nawahineokalai Evans, was Native Hawaiian and Chinese. His father, Samuel Wilder King (1886–1959), also Native Hawaiian, later became the delegate to the United States Congress from the Territory of Hawaii, and then governor. He attended Yale University where he received a Bachelor of Science degree in 1937 and Yale Law School, where he graduated with a Bachelor of Laws in 1940.

=== Personal ===
King married Anne van Patten Grilk (born 1921) on July 8, 1944, in Boulder, Colorado. They had a son, Samuel Pailthorpe King, Jr., and two daughters, Louise Kealiʻiloma King Lanzilotti and Charlotte "Becky" Lelepoki King; and six grandchildren, including Leilehua Lanzilotti.

== Legal career ==
King started in private law practice in Washington, D.C., in 1942. During World War II, he joined the United States Navy as a Japanese language translator from 1942 to 1946, and the Naval Reserve from 1946 to 1967. He returned to private practice of law in Honolulu, Hawaii, from 1946 to 1961. He was a district magistrate for the City and County of Honolulu from 1956 to 1961. Governor William F. Quinn appointed him judge to the First Circuit Court of Hawaii from 1961 to 1970, and then a judge on the Family Court of Hawaii from 1966 to 1970. In 1970 he resigned as a judge and ran as a Republican for governor of Hawaii, losing to incumbent John A. Burns. He returned to private law practice from 1970 to 1972.

=== Federal judicial service ===
King was nominated by President Richard Nixon on May 22, 1972, to a seat vacated by Judge Cyrus Nils Tavares on the United States District Court for the District of Hawaii. He was confirmed by the United States Senate on June 28, 1972, and received his commission on June 28, 1972. He served as Chief Judge from 1974 to 1984. Although there were two judgeships authorized for the district, the other judge, Dick Yin Wong, died in 1978. King had to try all the cases except for occasional help from visiting mainland judges. Walter Meheula Heen was nominated in January 1981 via a recess appointment, but was not confirmed, so by the end of 1981 King was back to being the only judge until Harold Fong was confirmed in 1982.

=== Notable cases ===
From The New York Times, "His favorite and longest-running case involved protecting a small finch-billed bird, the palila, by removing wild goats and sheep from the slopes of a volcano. He ruled in 1979 that the bird had standing to sue in federal court and monitored the bird’s welfare for the rest of his life." In 1973, King presided over the case that convicted suspected organized crime leader Wilford Kalaauala "Nappy" Pulawa and five others for income tax evasion. After taking senior status, he continued to hear cases, including a murder trial depicted in the book And the Sea Will Tell that took place on remote Palmyra Atoll. The trial moved to California because of pre-trial publicity, and included defense lawyers Vincent Bugliosi and Leonard Weinglass. King's other high-profile rulings include one "barring federal authorities from using a telescope to peer into a home without a warrant and upholding a state land-reform law that allowed residential leaseholders to buy land from landlords, including the Bishop Estate."

== Essay ==
In 1997, King joined with other respected Kanaka Maoli (Native Hawaiian) senior civic leaders to publish in the Honolulu Star-Bulletin newspaper the essay "Broken Trust" on the mismanagement of the trust fund that ran the Kamehameha Schools. Co-authors were Judge Walter Heen, Monsignor Charles Kekumano, educator Gladys Brandt, and William S. Richardson School of Law Professor Randall W. Roth. The investigation prompted by the report resulted in the reorganization of the Kamehameha Schools. He and Roth co-authored a book expanding the essay, published in 2006.

== Works ==
- Broken Trust: Greed, Mismanagement, and Political Manipulation at America's Largest Charitable Trust. University of Hawaii Press. March 2006. ISBN 978-0-8248-3014-4. 336 pages, with Randall W. Roth
- "Making it all pono a work in progress: Broken Trust: 10 years ago today". Honolulu Star-Bulletin. August 9, 2007.
- Judge Sam King A Memoir. Watermark Publishing. 2013. with Jerry Burris and Ken Kobayashi.

== Sources ==
Party political offices
Preceded by Randolph Crossley	Republican nominee for Governor of Hawaii; 1970	Succeeded by Randolph Crossley
Legal offices
Preceded by Cyrus Nils Tavares	Judge of the United States District Court for the District of Hawaii; 1972–1984	Succeeded by David Alan Ezra
Preceded by Martin Pence	Chief Judge of the United States District Court for the District of Hawaii; 1974–1984	Succeeded by Harold Fong
