= United States v. Texas =

United States v. Texas may refer to the following cases:

- United States v. Texas, 579 U.S. ___ (2016), a case in which the United States Supreme Court considered the legality of the Deferred Action for Parents of Americans program.
- United States v. Texas, 595 U.S. ___ (2021), a case in which the Supreme Court considered the constitutionality of the Texas Heartbeat Act.
- United States v. Texas, 599 U.S. ___ (2023), a case in which the Supreme Court considered whether the states have Article III standing to challenge the legality of the Department of Homeland Security's guidelines for the enforcement of civil immigration law.
- United States v. Texas, a pending Fifth Circuit Court of Appeals case on Texas Senate Bill 4, permitting state officials to arrest and deport migrants.
- United States v. Texas, 143 U.S. 621 (1892), a case to determine whether a parcel of land belonged to the United States or to Texas
- United States v. Texas, 162 U.S. 1 (1896)
- United States v. Texas, 314 U.S. 480 (1941)
- United States v. Texas, 339 U.S. 707 (1950)

== See also ==
- Texas v. United States (disambiguation)
