= Helen W. Gillmor =

American judge (born 1942)

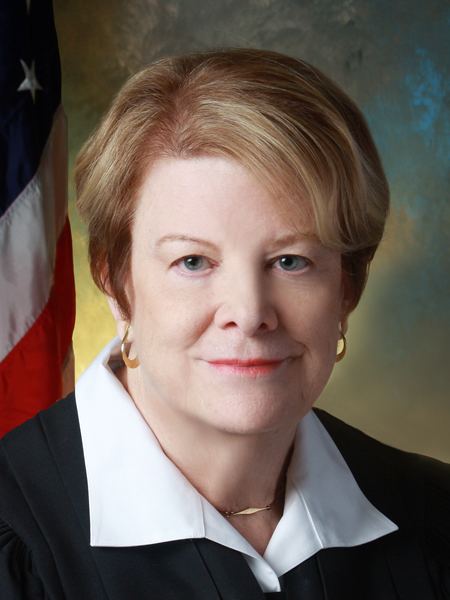
- Gillmor in 2013

Senior Judge of the United States District Court for the District of Hawaii
- Incumbent
- Assumed office June 30, 2009

Chief Judge of the United States District Court for the District of Hawaii
- In office 2005–2009
- Preceded by: David Alan Ezra
- Succeeded by: Susan Oki Mollway

Judge of the United States District Court for the District of Hawaii
- In office October 11, 1994 – June 30, 2009
- Appointed by: Bill Clinton
- Preceded by: Seat established by 104 Stat. 5089
- Succeeded by: Leslie E. Kobayashi

Personal details
- Born: Helen Patricia Willey; 1942 (age 83–84) Syracuse, New York, U.S.
- Education: Queens College, City University of New York (BA); Boston University School of Law (LLB)

Helen Patricia Willey Gillmor (born in 1942) is a senior United States district judge of the United States District Court for the District of Hawaii.

== Early life and education ==
Born in Syracuse, New York, Gillmor received a Bachelor of Arts degree from Queens College, City University of New York in 1965, and a Bachelor of Laws from Boston University School of Law in 1968.

== Career ==
Gillmor was in private practice in Boston, Massachusetts from 1968 to 1969, and in El Paso, Texas in 1969. She was a lecturer at the International Legal Center of the United States Agency for International Development, in Seoul, South Korea from 1969 to 1970, returning to private practice in Camden, Maine in 1970, and in Honolulu, Hawaii from 1971 to 1972, 1974 to 1977, and 1985 to 1994. She was a law clerk to William S. Richardson, Chief Justice of the Hawaii State Supreme Court in 1972, a deputy public defender of the Honolulu Office of the Public Defender from 1972 to 1974, and a lecturer at the University of Hawaii in 1975. She was a district court judge of the Hawaii State Family Court, First Circuit from 1977 to 1983, and of the District Court of Hawaii for the same circuit from 1983 to 1985.

== Federal judicial service ==
On August 25, 1994, Gillmor was nominated by President Bill Clinton to a new seat on the United States District Court for the District of Hawaii created by 104 Stat. 5089. She was confirmed by the United States Senate on October 7, 1994, and received her commission on October 11, 1994. She became chief judge in 2005. She assumed senior status on June 30, 2009.

In November 2012, Gillmor found that Hawaii's licensing requirement to openly carry firearms did not violate the Second Amendment to the United States Constitution. Her judgment was then reversed by a divided panel of the United States Court of Appeals for the Ninth Circuit in July 2018. The ruling was re-heard en banc by the 9th Circuit and Judge Gillmor's decision was affirmed in March 2021.

== Sources ==
Legal offices
Preceded by Seat established by 104 Stat. 5089	Judge of the United States District Court for the District of Hawaii; 1994–2009	Succeeded by Leslie E. Kobayashi
Preceded by David Alan Ezra	Chief Judge of the United States District Court for the District of Hawaii; 2005–2009	Succeeded by Susan Oki Mollway
