= Texas v. United States =

Texas v. United States may refer to:

- Texas v. United States (2016), relating to gender identity
- California v. Texas, a 2021 court case relating to the Affordable Care Act known as Texas v. United States in the lower courts
- Texas vs The Nation, a college football all-star game

== See also ==
- United States v. Texas (disambiguation)
