= Martin Pence =

American judge

Senior Judge of the United States District Court for the District of Hawaii
- In office November 18, 1974 – January 31, 2000

Chief Judge of the United States District Court for the District of Hawaii
- In office 1961–1974
- Preceded by: Cyrus Nils Tavares
- Succeeded by: Samuel Pailthorpe King

Judge of the United States District Court for the District of Hawaii
- In office September 22, 1961 – November 18, 1974
- Appointed by: John F. Kennedy
- Preceded by: Seat established by 73 Stat. 4
- Succeeded by: Dick Yin Wong

Personal details
- Born: Martin Pence; November 18, 1904 Sterling, Kansas
- Died: May 29, 2000 (aged 95) Maunawili, Hawaii
- Education: read law

Martin Pence (November 18, 1904 – May 29, 2000) was a United States district judge of the United States District Court for the District of Hawaii.

== Education and career ==
Born in Sterling, Kansas, Pence attended the UC Berkeley School of Law, but read law to enter the bar in 1928. He was in private practice of law in Hilo, Territory of Hawaii from 1936 to 1945. He was a judge of the Third Circuit Court of the Territory of Hawaii from 1945 to 1950. He returned to private practice in Hilo, Territory of Hawaii (State of Hawaii from 1959) from 1950 to 1961.

== Federal judicial service ==
Pence was nominated by President John F. Kennedy on September 14, 1961, to the United States District Court for the District of Hawaii, to a new seat created by 73 Stat. 4. He was confirmed by the United States Senate on September 21, 1961, and received his commission on September 22, 1961. He served as Chief Judge from 1961 to 1974. He assumed senior status on November 18, 1974. His service was terminated on January 31, 2000, due to his retirement. He died on May 29, 2000, in Maunawili, Hawaii.

== Sources ==
Legal offices
Preceded by Seat established by 73 Stat. 4	Judge of the United States District Court for the District of Hawaii; 1961–1974	Succeeded by Dick Yin Wong
Preceded by Cyrus Nils Tavares	Chief Judge of the United States District Court for the District of Hawaii; 1961–1974	Succeeded by Samuel Pailthorpe King
