= Cyrus Nils Tavares =

American judge

Senior Judge of the United States District Court for the District of Hawaii
- In office April 12, 1972 – August 3, 1976

Chief Judge of the United States District Court for the District of Hawaii
- In office 1960–1961
- Preceded by: Office established
- Succeeded by: Martin Pence

Judge of the United States District Court for the District of Hawaii
- In office October 13, 1960 – April 12, 1972
- Nominated by: Dwight D. Eisenhower
- Appointed by: Dwight D. Eisenhower (recess); John F. Kennedy (commission)
- Preceded by: Seat established by 73 Stat. 4
- Succeeded by: Samuel Pailthorpe King

Personal details
- Born: Cyrus Nils Tavares; April 12, 1902 Pukalani, Territory of Hawaii
- Died: August 3, 1976 (aged 74)
- Children: Shirley Ann Tavares
- Education: University of Michigan Law School (J.D.)
- Alma mater: University of Michigan-Ann Arbor

Cyrus Nils Tavares (April 12, 1902 – August 3, 1976) was a United States district judge of the United States District Court for the District of Hawaii.

== Education and career ==
Born in Pukalani, Territory of Hawaii, Tavares received a Juris Doctor from University of Michigan Law School in 1925. He was in private practice of law in Maui County, Territory of Hawaii from 1925 to 1927. He was a deputy attorney general of the Territory of Hawaii from 1927 to 1934. He was in private practice in Honolulu, Territory of Hawaii from 1934 to 1941. He was a special deputy attorney general of the Territory of Hawaii for war matters from 1941 to 1942. He was an assistant attorney general of the Territory of Hawaii from 1942 to 1943. He was Attorney General of the Territory of Hawaii from 1944 to 1947. He was in private practice of law in Honolulu, Territory of Hawaii (State of Hawaii from 1959) from 1947 to 1960. From March 1953 to September 1956, Tavares served on the Hawaii Statehood Commission.

== Federal judicial service ==
Tavares received a recess appointment from President Dwight D. Eisenhower on October 13, 1960, to the United States District Court for the District of Hawaii, to a new seat created by 73 Stat. 4. He was nominated to the same seat by President Eisenhower on January 10, 1961. He was confirmed by the United States Senate on September 21, 1961, and received his commission from President John F. Kennedy on September 22, 1961. He served as Chief Judge from 1960 to 1961. He assumed senior status on April 12, 1972. His service was terminated on August 3, 1976, due to his death.

== Sources ==
Legal offices
Preceded by Seat established by 73 Stat. 4	Judge of the United States District Court for the District of Hawaii; 1960–1972	Succeeded by Samuel Pailthorpe King
Preceded by Office established	Chief Judge of the United States District Court for the District of Hawaii; 1960–1961	Succeeded by Martin Pence
