= Texas Senate Bill 4 (2023) =

Texas State Legislature
- House voted: November 19, 2023 (83–61)
- Senate voted: November 14, 2023 (17–11)
- Signed into law: December 18, 2023
- Governor: Greg Abbott
- Bill: Senate Bill 4

Status: On hold

Texas Senate Bill 4 (Texas S.B. 4) is a Texas state statute enacted by the Texas Legislature and signed into law by governor Greg Abbott on December 18, 2023. The bill allows state officials to arrest and deport migrants who enter the state illegally.

Senate Bill 4 is the subject of United States v. Texas, a lawsuit filed against Texas alleging that the bill violates the Supremacy Clause of the Constitution.

== Constitutionality ==
In January 2024, the Department of Justice sued Texas over Senate Bill 4. In United States v. Texas, district court judge David Alan Ezra ruled that the bill violated the Supremacy Clause of the Constitution, a conflict of laws clause.

On March 19, the Supreme Court ruled that the law could go into effect while the Court of Appeals for the Fifth Circuit considers the district court's judgment. Hours later, the appellate court put the bill on hold. United States v. Texas was argued on March 20.

== See also ==
- Standoff at Eagle Pass
- Mexico–United States border
- Mexico–United States border crisis
- Operation Lone Star
