= Leslie E. Kobayashi =

American judge (born 1957)

Leslie Kobayashi
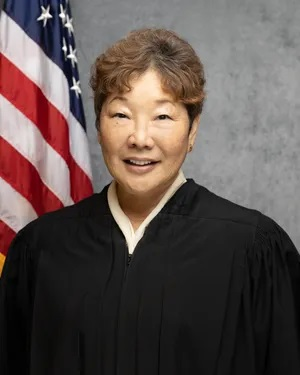

Senior Judge of the United States District Court for the District of Hawaii
- Incumbent
- Assumed office October 9, 2024

Judge of the United States District Court for the District of Hawaii
- In office December 22, 2010 – October 9, 2024
- Appointed by: Barack Obama
- Preceded by: Helen W. Gillmor
- Succeeded by: Shanlyn A. S. Park

Magistrate Judge of the United States District Court for the District of Hawaii
- In office August 2, 1999 – December 22, 2010

Personal details
- Born: Leslie Emi Kobayashi; 1957 (age 68–69) Mount Holly, New Jersey, U.S.
- Spouse: Clarence Pacarro (m. 1990)
- Education: Wellesley College (BA); Boston College (JD)

Leslie Emi Kobayashi (born 1957) is an American lawyer who serves as a senior United States district judge for the United States District Court for the District of Hawaii.

== Early life and education ==
Kobayashi was born in 1957 in Mount Holly Township, New Jersey. She received her Bachelor of Arts degree from Wellesley College in 1979 and her Juris Doctor from the Boston College Law School in 1983.

== Career ==
Kobayashi worked as a trial attorney and managing partner of the law firm of Fujiyama, Duffy & Fujiyama in Honolulu for a period of 17 years. She worked as a deputy prosecuting attorney in Honolulu before becoming a United States magistrate judge on August 2, 1999. In 2000 and 2001, she taught at the William S. Richardson School of Law.

=== Federal judicial service ===
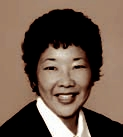
Leslie E. Kobayashi; ca. 2010

On April 21, 2010, Kobayashi was nominated to a seat as a United States district judge of the United States District Court for the District of Hawaii by Barack Obama. She was nominated to fill the seat vacated by Judge Helen W. Gillmor, who assumed senior status in 2009. The United States Senate confirmed the nomination on December 18, 2010. This makes her the first Japanese American federal judge confirmed during the Obama Administration. She received her commission on December 22, 2010. Kobayashi assumed senior status on October 9, 2024.

=== Notable cases ===
On December 13, 2022, Kobayashi dismissed Hawaiian Kingdom v. Biden, a lawsuit brought by an organisation claiming to be the Kingdom of Hawaii in exile seeking to have Hawaii recognised as an occupied sovereign country. On August 8, 2023, she partially blocked Hawaii's ban on firearms in public places. On September 6, 2024, the 9th circuit largely reinstated Hawaii's firearm ban, and denied en banc on January 15, 2025.

== See also ==
- List of Asian American jurists

Legal offices
Preceded by Helen W. Gillmor	Judge of the United States District Court for the District of Hawaii; 2010–2024	Succeeded by Shanlyn A. S. Park
