= James Leslie Coke =

American judge (1875–1957)

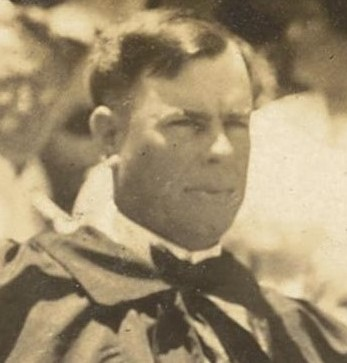
- James Leslie Coke

Justice of the Supreme Court of Hawaii
- In office January 13, 1917 – April 17, 1922

Personal details
- Born: August 31, 1875 Marshfield, Oregon
- Died: August 12, 1957 (aged 81)
- Resting place: Oahu Cemetery, Honolulu

James Leslie Coke (August 31, 1875 – August 12, 1957) was a justice of the Supreme Court of Hawaii from January 13, 1917, to April 17, 1922, serving as chief justice from March 7, 1918, to April 17, 1922, and again from 1935 to 1941.

== Biography ==
Born at Marshfield, Coos County, Oregon, to John Stephen and Mary E. Coke, he was the grandson of Sterling and Caroline Cocke and a great-grandson of Revolutionary War participant William Cocke.

Coke arrived in Hawaii in 1898 to observe the ceremonies of Hawaii's annexation to the United States. He began his practice in Wailuku, Maui and in 1908 was elected as a county attorney. Coke moved to Honolulu in 1909, represented Oahu in the Territorial Senate in 1912, and became circuit court judge in 1916.In 1912 he also fathered with Henrietta Amoy Ahlo, an illegitimate son, James Anthony Tokunaga (adopted) whom James L. Coke never recognized.

In 1917, President Woodrow Wilson appointed Coke as an associate justice to the territorial supreme court, and in 1918 Wilson elevated Coke to chief justice, which office he held until 1922. In 1935, Coke was again appointed chief justice by President Franklin D. Roosevelt, retiring from that position in 1941. Coke later "lectured to law classes in Japan at the urging of the Imperial Japanese government", and "worked with the Japanese Bar to set up a jury system in Japan".

He was buried in Oahu Cemetery, Honolulu.

== See also ==
- James L. Coke House

Political offices
Preceded by Edward M. Watson	Justice of the Supreme Court of Hawaii; 1917–1922	Succeeded by Antonio Perry
