= List of United States federal courthouses in Hawaii =

Following is a list of current and former courthouses of the United States federal court system located in Hawaii. Each entry indicates the name of the building along with an image, if available, its location and the jurisdiction it covers, the dates during which it was used for each such jurisdiction, and, if applicable the person for whom it was named, and the date of renaming. Dates of use will not necessarily correspond with the dates of construction or demolition of a building, as pre-existing structures may be adapted or court use, and former court buildings may later be put to other uses. Also, the official name of the building may be changed at some point after its use as a federal court building has been initiated.

== Courthouses ==
Courthouse	City	Image	Street address	Jurisdiction	Dates of use	Named for
Federal Building, U.S. Post Office and Courthouse^{†}	Hilo		154 Waianuenue Avenue	D. Haw.	1959–1979	n/a
King David Kalakaua Building^{†}	Honolulu		335 Merchant Street	D. Haw.	1959–1978	King Kalākaua (2003; renamed after end of federal use)
Prince Kūhiō Federal Building	Honolulu		300 Ala Moana Boulevard	D. Haw.	1977–present	Prince Jonah Kūhiō Kalanianaʻole

== Key ==
^{†}	Listed on the National Register of Historic Places (NRHP)
^{††}	NRHP-listed and also designated as a National Historic Landmark
