= James L. Coke House =

Historic house in Hawaii, United States

- U.S. National Register of Historic Places
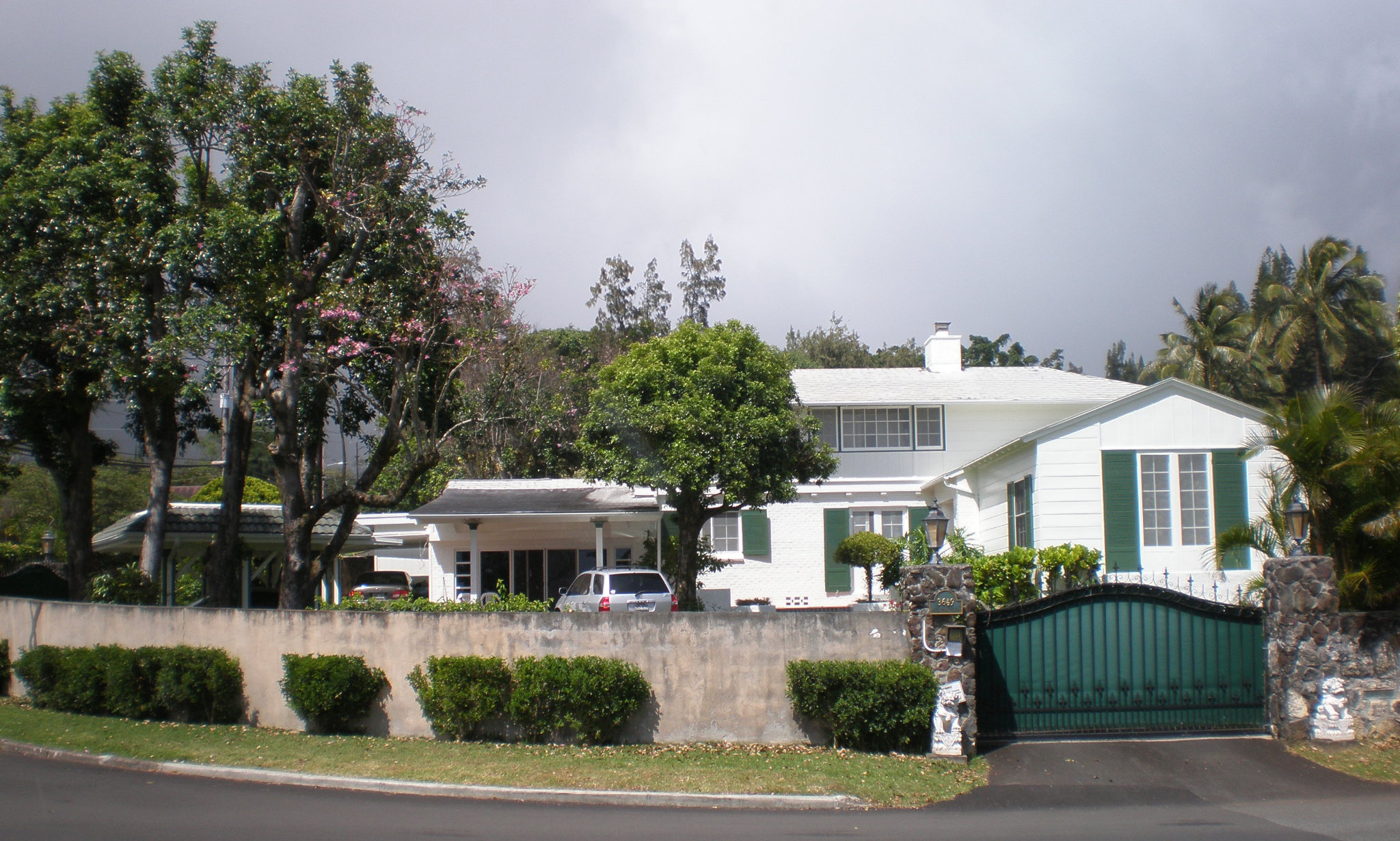
- "Waipuna" in 2009

- Location within Oahu Location within Hawaii
- Location: 3649 Nuuanu Pali Dr., Honolulu, Hawaii
- Coordinates: 21°20′37″N 157°49′44″W
- Area: 0.6 acres (0.24 ha)
- Built: 1934
- Architect: C.W. Dickey, Richard Tongg
- NRHP reference No.: 86001618
- Added to NRHP: August 20, 1986

The James L. Coke House, also called Waipuna ('springwater' in the Hawaiian language), at 3649 Nuʻuanu Pali Drive in Honolulu, Hawaiʻi was built in 1934 for Judge James L. Coke, who had that year been reappointed Chief Justice of the Hawaii Supreme Court by U.S. President Franklin D. Roosevelt. Its architecture is significant as an example of the residential work of C.W. Dickey, the most prominent local architect of the period, and its landscaping represents the work of the preeminent landscape architect of the period, Richard Tongg. The house and grounds were added to the National Register of Historic Places in 1986.

The house is not typical of Dickey's residential work, but displays fine craftsmanship and is well adapted to an indoor-outdoor lifestyle. It is a two-story, double-wall building on an L-shaped plan, with a gabled roof over one wing and a hipped roof over the other. The outside walls are of brick on the ground floor, with clapboard siding on the upper floor, both painted white. The interior floors are of ohia wood and the stairway bannister and dining room chandelier are of wrought iron.

Tongg landscaped both the front yard and the back lot, which straddles Nuʻuanu Stream, during 1935–37. Among his other notable landscape designs were Andrews Outdoor Theatre at the University of Hawaiʻi, the Alexander & Baldwin Building, local residences for George W. Vanderbilt and Doris Duke, and the central concourse garden at Honolulu International Airport.
