= Sunshine tax =

North American term for costs and salary

"Sunshine tax" or "Paradise tax" is an ironic term used in the United States and Canada to describe the phenomenon that salaries are often lower than the national average, and costs of living higher than the national average, in places that have a desirably temperate climate.

The term can also be used to mean anything that has the effect of making costs higher in areas like the Sunbelt. In 2007, the San Diego Union-Tribune calculated the cost of the California sunshine tax at $1.1 billion just for the additional cost of gasoline in the state.

In Hawaii, the same concept is called a "paradise tax". It arises because incomes are lower and the cost of living is higher in Hawaii than on the mainland. It is not an actual tax, but rather a perceived persistent difference between costs among locations. It is also described as "the price you pay for paradise" or "the cost of living in paradise." Randall W. Roth, in a book entitled The Price of Paradise, listed a number of possible causes, including shipping costs, land availability, and differences in regulation.

The phenomenon arises because many people are willing to accept lower earnings and higher costs of living to live in a place like Hawaii, California, Florida, Colorado, British Columbia, or other places with an attractive climate.

"As most people know, everything seems to cost more in California. The houses are more expensive, the gas and groceries cost more and don't ask about the cost of daycare. This added cost of living has inspired its own term – the sunshine tax. It is the added cost to live in one of the best climates on earth, where the sun shines almost every day. When the sun is taxed, freedom is just a phase (Fahrel D, 2019)."
