= Edward M. Watson =

American judge (1874–1938)

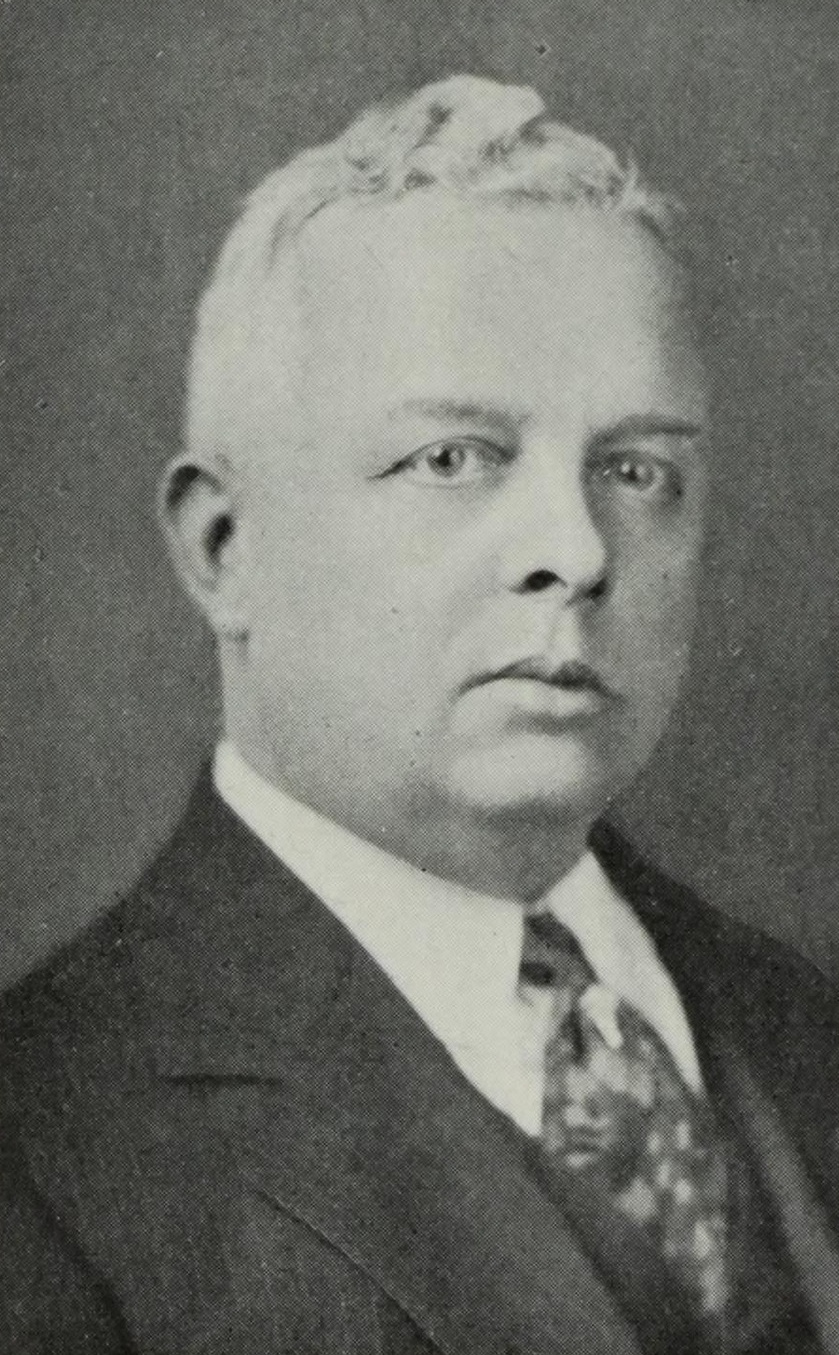
Edward M. Watson in 1921

Edward Minor Watson Jr. (December 20, 1874 – September 23, 1938) was a justice of the Supreme Court of Hawaii from March 19, 1914 to December 15, 1916.

A native of Mississippi, Watson was "a member of one of the oldest and most distinguished families of the South", his father, Edward Minor Watson, having been an assistant Attorney General of the United States under President Grover Cleveland. He received a law degree from the University of Mississippi, and gained admission to the bar in that state on November 22, 1897. He was for a number of years the private secretary, and later the law partner of Senator Sullivan of Mississippi. Watson came to Hawaii in 1901, and was considered as a potential territorial governor before his nomination to the court. In 1935, President Franklin D. Roosevelt appointed him as a judge of the United States District Court for the Territory of Hawaii, on which he served until his death on September 23, 1938.

Political offices
Preceded by John T. DeBolt	Justice of the Supreme Court of Hawaii; 1914–1916	Succeeded by James Leslie Coke
