= John Michael Seabright =

American judge (born 1959)

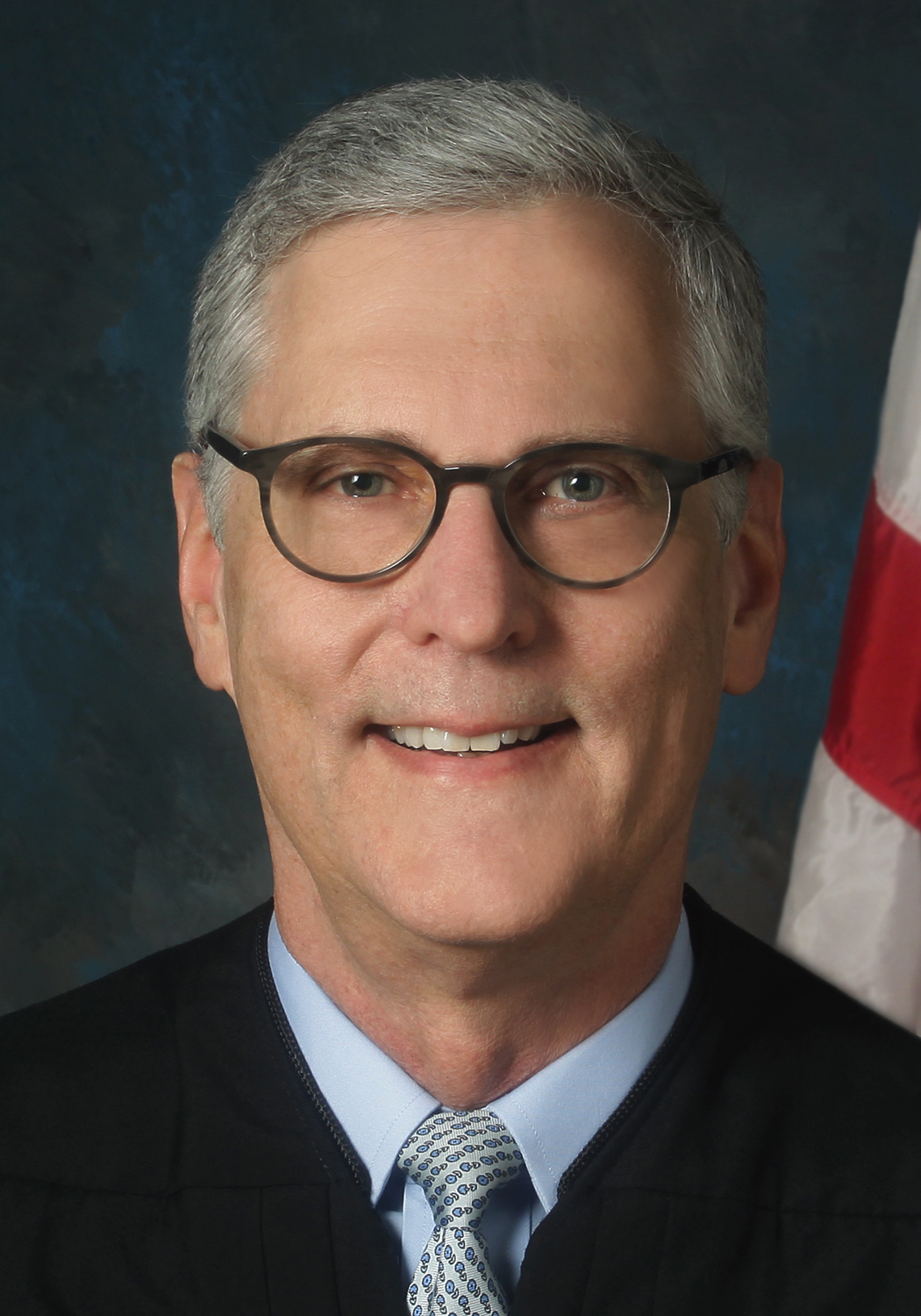

Senior Judge of the United States District Court for the District of Hawaii
- Incumbent
- Assumed office January 30, 2024

Chief Judge of the United States District Court for the District of Hawaii
- In office November 6, 2015 – November 6, 2022
- Preceded by: Susan Oki Mollway
- Succeeded by: Derrick Watson

Judge of the United States District Court for the District of Hawaii
- In office April 28, 2005 – January 30, 2024
- Appointed by: George W. Bush
- Preceded by: Alan Cooke Kay
- Succeeded by: Micah W. J. Smith

Personal details
- Born: John Michael Seabright; 1959 (age 66–67) Wheeling, West Virginia, U.S.
- Education: Tulane University (BA); George Washington University (JD)

John Michael Seabright (born 1959) is an American lawyer who serves as a senior United States district judge of the United States District Court for the District of Hawaii.

== Early life and education ==
Born in Wheeling, West Virginia, Seabright received a Bachelor of Arts degree from Tulane University in 1981 and a Juris Doctor from George Washington University Law School in 1984.

== Career ==
Seabright was in private practice in Hawaii from 1984 to 1987. He was an assistant United States attorney in the District of Columbia from 1987 to 1990, and then held the same office in the District of Hawaii from 1990 to 2005, becoming a supervisory assistant United States attorney in 2001. He was an adjunct professor at the William S. Richardson School of Law of the University of Hawaiʻi at Mānoa in 1999, 2000, and 2002.

=== Federal judicial service ===
On February 14, 2005, President George W. Bush nominated Seabright to a seat on the United States District Court for the District of Hawaii vacated by Judge Alan Cooke Kay. The Senate confirmed Seabright by a 98-0 vote on April 27, 2005, and he received his commission on April 28, 2005. He became chief judge on November 6, 2015 when Susan Oki Mollway assumed senior status and served until November 6, 2022. Seabright assumed senior status on January 30, 2024.

== Sources ==
Legal offices
| Preceded by Alan Cooke Kay | Judge of the United States District Court for the District of Hawaii; 2005–2024 | Succeeded by Micah W. J. Smith |
| Preceded by Susan Oki Mollway | Chief Judge of the United States District Court for the District of Hawaii; 2015–2022 | Succeeded by Derrick Watson |
