= Harold Fong =

American judge (1938–1995)

Chief Judge of the United States District Court for the District of Hawaii
- In office 1984–1991
- Preceded by: Samuel Pailthorpe King
- Succeeded by: Alan Cooke Kay

Judge of the United States District Court for the District of Hawaii
- In office June 21, 1982 – April 20, 1995
- Appointed by: Ronald Reagan
- Preceded by: Walter Heen
- Succeeded by: Susan Oki Mollway

Personal details
- Born: Harold Michael Fong; April 28, 1938 Honolulu, Territory of Hawaii, U.S.
- Died: April 20, 1995 (aged 56) Honolulu, Hawaii, U.S.
- Education: University of Southern California (A.B.); University of Michigan Law School (J.D.)

Harold Michael Fong (April 28, 1938 – April 20, 1995) was an American lawyer and a United States district judge of the United States District Court for the District of Hawaii.

== Education and career ==
Fong was born on April 28, 1938, in Honolulu, Hawaii, to a Chinese Hawaiian family. He attended the University of Southern California where he received an Artium Baccalaureus degree in 1960. He later went to the University of Michigan Law School where he got a Juris Doctor in 1964. He was named the deputy prosecuting attorney for Honolulu the next year, serving until 1968, when he went into private practice. In 1969, Fong became an assistant federal prosecutor in the District of Hawaii. He was appointed United States Attorney in 1973 and served the same district until 1978, after which he returned to private practice until 1982.

== Federal judicial service ==
Fong was nominated by President Ronald Reagan on February 11, 1982, to a seat vacated by Judge Walter Heen on the United States District Court for the District of Hawaii. He was confirmed by the United States Senate on June 18, 1982, and received his commission on June 21, 1982. He served as Chief Judge from 1984 to 1991. Fong died on April 20, 1995, in Honolulu, from complications of heart surgery.

== Notable cases ==
Judge Fong authored the judicial opinion in Anbe v. Kikuchi that determined federal rules for international service of legal process under the Hague Service Convention. Fong also presided over a case involving Hawaii's ban on write-in votes and a case involving the assets of Ferdinand Marcos and Imelda Marcos of the Philippines.

== See also ==
- List of Asian American jurists

== Sources ==
Legal offices
Preceded by Walter Heen	Judge of the United States District Court for the District of Hawaii; 1982–1995	Succeeded by Susan Oki Mollway
Preceded by Samuel Pailthorpe King	Chief Judge of the United States District Court for the District of Hawaii; 1984–1991	Succeeded by Alan Cooke Kay
