= Micah W. J. Smith =

American judge (born 1981)

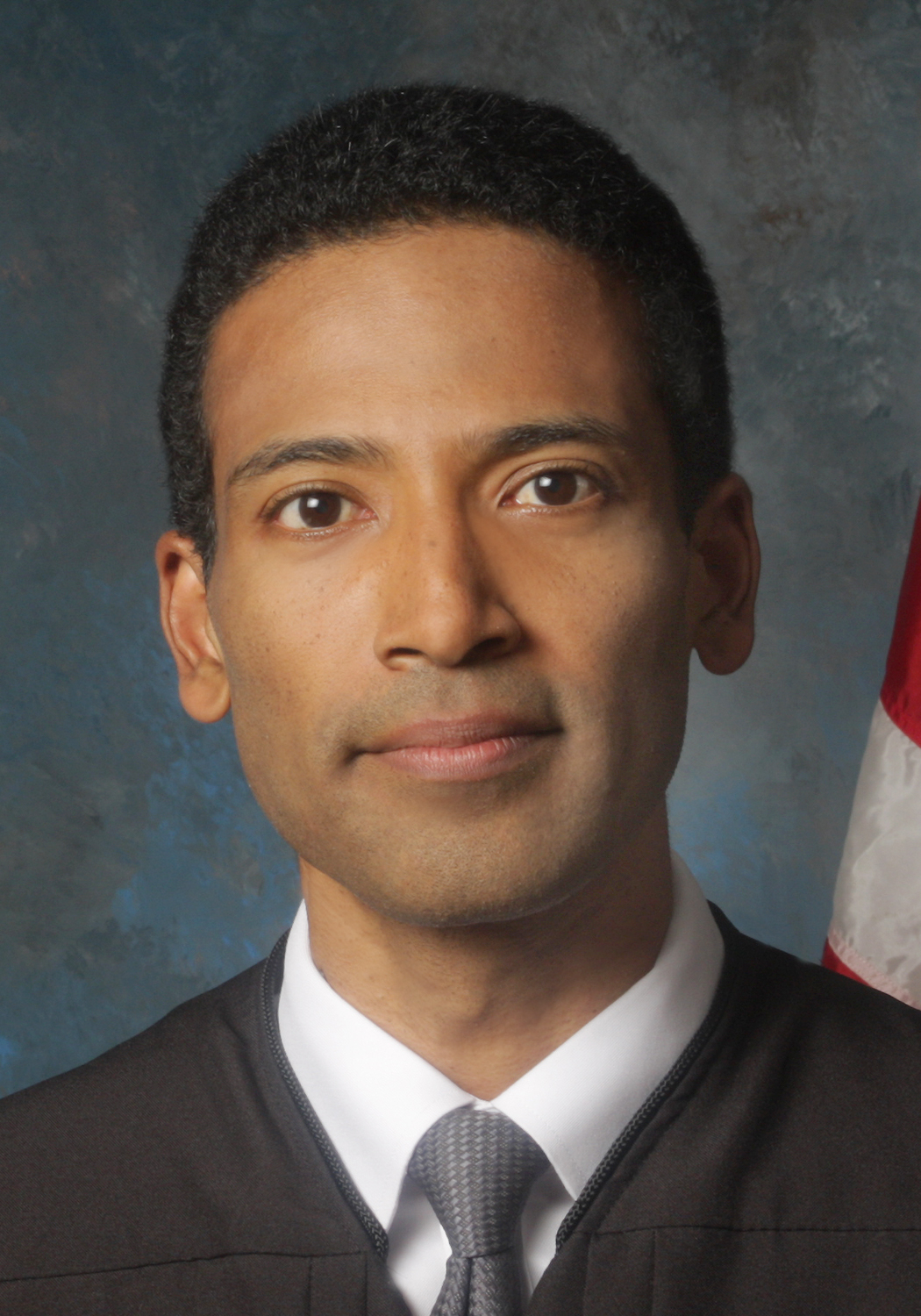

Judge of the United States District Court for the District of Hawaii
- Incumbent
- Assumed office January 31, 2024
- Appointed by: Joe Biden
- Preceded by: John Michael Seabright

Personal details
- Born: Micah William Janso Smith; 1981 (age 44–45) Mill Hall, Pennsylvania, U.S.
- Education: Lock Haven University of Pennsylvania (BA); Harvard University (JD)

Micah William Janso Smith (born 1981) is an American lawyer from Hawaii who has served as a United States district judge of the United States District Court for the District of Hawaii since 2024. He served as an assistant United States attorney for the District of Hawaii from 2018 to 2024.

== Education ==
Smith is a graduate of Kauai High School and received a Bachelor of Arts, summa cum laude, from Lock Haven University of Pennsylvania in 2003 and a Juris Doctor magna cum laude, from Harvard Law School in 2006.

== Career ==
From 2006 to 2007, Smith served as a law clerk to Judge Guido Calabresi of the United States Court of Appeals for the Second Circuit and for Justice David Souter of the Supreme Court of the United States from 2007 to 2008. From 2008 to 2012, he was an associate and counsel at O'Melveny & Myers in Washington, D.C. From 2012 to 2018, he served as an assistant United States attorney in the U.S. Attorney's Office for the Southern District of New York. From 2018 to 2024, he served as an assistant United States attorney in the U.S. Attorney's Office for the District of Hawaii, where he serves as Chief of the Criminal Division and Criminal Civil Rights Coordinator. From 2022 to 2024, he served as Chief of Appeals and Legal Strategy within the office.

=== Federal judicial service ===
On August 30, 2023, President Joe Biden announced his intent to nominate Smith to serve as a United States district judge of the United States District Court for the District of Hawaii. On September 11, 2023, his nomination was sent to the Senate. President Biden nominated Smith to the seat to be vacated by Judge John Michael Seabright, who subsequently assumed senior status on January 30, 2024. His nomination was supported by the National Asian Pacific American Bar Association. On October 4, 2023, a hearing on his nomination was held before the Senate Judiciary Committee. On October 26, 2023, his nomination was reported out of committee by a 14–7 vote. On November 29, 2023, the United States Senate invoked cloture on his nomination by a 57–42 vote. His nomination was confirmed later that day by a 57–41 vote. He received his judicial commission on January 31, 2024 and was sworn in the same day.

== See also ==
- List of African American federal judges
- List of African American jurists
- List of Asian American jurists
- List of law clerks for the third seat of the Supreme Court of the United States

Legal offices
Preceded by John Michael Seabright	Judge of the United States District Court for the District of Hawaii; 2024–present	Incumbent
