= William Barker Lymer =

American lawyer, Attorney General, and federal judge in Hawaii (1882–1949)

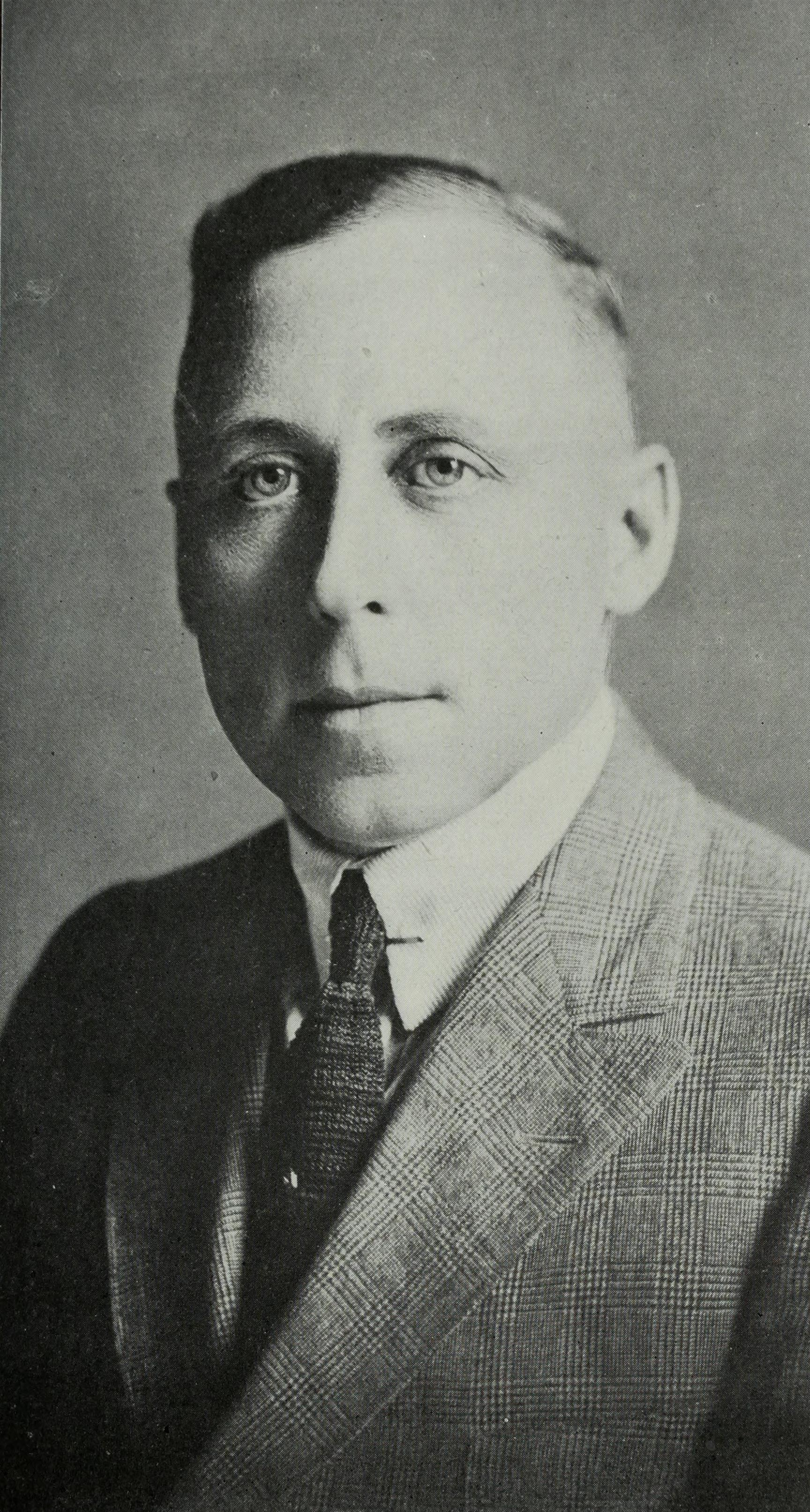

Judge of the United States District Court for the District of Hawaii
- In office 1928–1934
- President: Calvin Coolidge

Attorney General of Hawaii
- In office 1925–1928
- Governor: Wallace Rider Farrington
- Preceded by: John A. Matthewman
- Succeeded by: Harry R. Hewitt

Personal details
- Born: August 22, 1882 Clarinda, Iowa, U.S.
- Died: March 28, 1949 (aged 66) Honolulu, Territory of Hawaii, U.S.
- Education: Amity College (A.B.); Harvard Law School (LL.B.)
- Profession: Jurist, lawyer, government official

William Barker Lymer (August 22, 1882 – March 28, 1949) was an American attorney, government official, and jurist who served as Attorney General of Hawaii from 1925 to 1928 and as a federal judge on the United States District Court for the District of Hawaii from 1928 to 1934.

== Early life and education ==
Lymer was born on August 22, 1882, in Clarinda, Iowa, to Richard Henry Lymer and Sarah (Bagnall) Lymer. He received his early education in Iowa public schools before attending Amity College in College Springs, Iowa, from which he graduated with a Bachelor of Arts (A.B.) degree in 1901. He subsequently attended Harvard Law School, earning his Bachelor of Laws (LL.B.) in 1907.

== Legal and judicial career ==
Following his graduation from Harvard Law School, Lymer moved to Honolulu, Territory of Hawaii, where he entered private legal practice. Active in territorial civic and legal affairs, he served as a member of the Board of Regents of the University of Hawaii during the 1920s.

In 1925, Territorial Governor Wallace Rider Farrington appointed Lymer as Attorney General of Hawaii. He served in that office until 1928, when President Calvin Coolidge nominated him to serve as a United States District Judge for the Territory of Hawaii. Confirmed by the Senate, Lymer served on the federal territorial bench from 1928 until 1934, after which he returned to private practice in Honolulu.
