= Shanlyn A. S. Park =

American judge (born 1969)

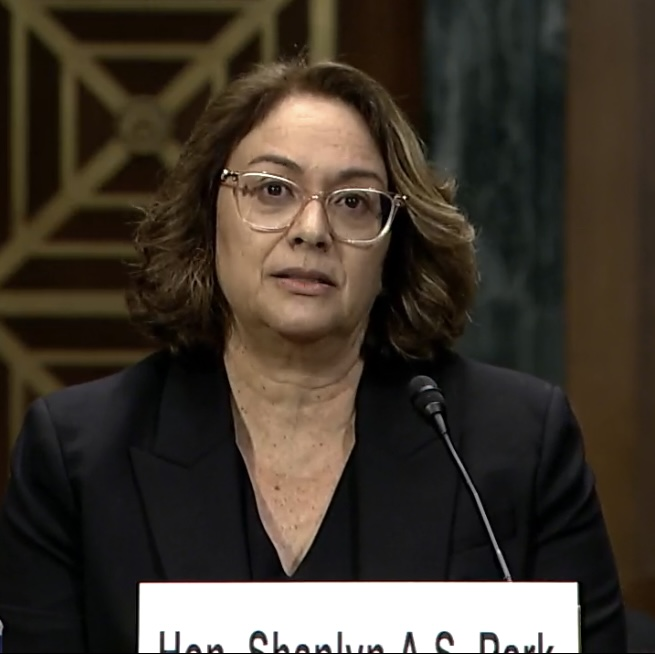

Judge of the United States District Court for the District of Hawaii
- Incumbent
- Assumed office October 15, 2024
- Appointed by: Joe Biden
- Preceded by: Leslie E. Kobayashi

Judge of the Hawaii First Circuit Court
- In office 2021 – October 15, 2024
- Appointed by: David Ige
- Preceded by: Karen T. Nakasone

Personal details
- Born: Shanlyn Alohakeao Souza; 1969 (age 56–57) Honolulu, Hawaii, U.S.
- Education: Chaminade University of Honolulu (BA); University of Hawaiʻi at Mānoa (JD)

Shanlyn Alohakeao Souza Park (née Souza; born 1969) is an American lawyer from Hawaii who has served as a United States district judge of the United States District Court for the District of Hawaii since 2024. She previously served as a judge of the Hawaii First Circuit Court from 2021 to 2024.

== Education ==
A graduate of Sacred Hearts Academy, Park received a Bachelor of Arts, cum laude, from Chaminade University of Honolulu in 1991 and a Juris Doctor from the William S. Richardson School of Law at the University of Hawaiʻi at Mānoa in 1995.

== Career ==
Park started her career as a law clerk for Judge Francis I. Yamashita, U.S. Magistrate Judge for the District of Hawaii, serving from 1995 to 1996. From 1996 to 1997, she was in private practice at Hisaka Stone & Goto in Honolulu. From 1997 to 2017, Park served as an assistant federal public defender in the Office of the Federal Public Defender for the District of Hawaii. From 2017 to 2021, she worked at the Honolulu law firms McCorriston Miller Mukai MacKinnon, L.L.P. and Gallagher Kane Amai & Reyes. On October 8, 2021, Park was nominated to serve as a judge of the a state court judge on the Hawaii First Circuit Court in Oahu, Hawaii. She was nominated to fill the vacancy left by the elevation of Judge Karen T. Nakasone. She was confirmed by the Hawaii Senate on October 29, 2021.

=== Federal judicial service ===
On September 6, 2023, President Joe Biden announced his intent to nominate Park to serve as a United States district judge of the United States District Court for the District of Hawaii. On September 27, 2023, her nomination was sent to the Senate. President Biden nominated Park to the seat vacated by Judge Leslie E. Kobayashi, who subsequently assumed senior status on October 9, 2024. On October 4, 2023, a hearing on her nomination was held before the Senate Judiciary Committee. On October 26, 2023, her nomination was reported out of committee by a 12–9 vote. On November 29, 2023, the United States Senate invoked cloture on her nomination by a 53–44 vote. On November 30, 2023, her nomination was confirmed by a 53–45 vote. She received her judicial commission on October 15, 2024. Park became the first Native Hawaiian woman on the federal bench.

Legal offices
Preceded by Leslie E. Kobayashi	Judge of the United States District Court for the District of Hawaii; 2024–present	Incumbent
