= Frank D. Padgett =

American judge (1923–2021)

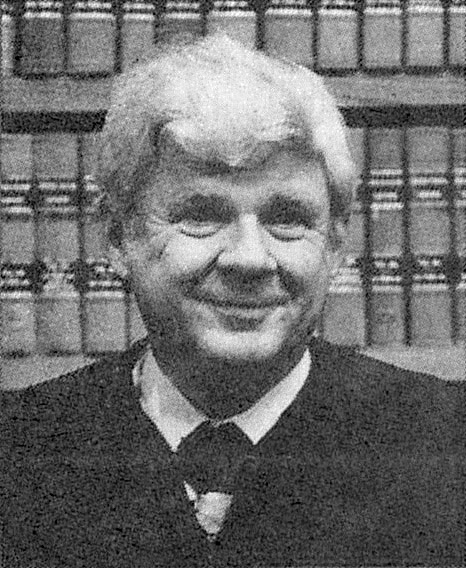
- Justice Frank D. Padgett

Associate Justice of the Hawaiʻi Supreme Court
- In office 1982–1992
- Preceded by: Benjamin Menor
- Succeeded by: Steven Levinson

Personal details
- Born: March 9, 1923 Vincennes, Indiana, U.S.
- Died: July 11, 2021 (aged 98) Honolulu, Hawaii, U.S.
- Citizenship: United States
- Spouse: Sibyl Padgett
- Education: Harvard College
- Nickname: Bobcat

Military service
- Allegiance: United States
- Branch/service: Army Air Force
- Unit: 308th Heavy Bombardment Group
- Battles/wars: World War II; South-East Asian theatre of World War II

Frank David Padgett (March 9, 1923 – July 11, 2021) was an American judge and World War II B-24 bomber pilot. Padgett grew up during the Great Depression and earned a scholarship to Harvard College in Massachusetts. Before he could graduate however, he was called to active duty in the U.S. Army Air Force and for the next 13 months, trained as a pilot.

== Biography ==
In 1944, Padgett and a crew of ten flew their B-24 heavy bomber from Mitchell Field in New York to an airbase in southeastern China. There, as part of the 373rd Squadron, 308 Bomb Group, 14th. Air Force, they began bombing operations against the Japanese. On January 1, 1945, while on their 13th. mission, they were hit by enemy anti-aircraft fire and forced to bail out. Coming down spread out across the French Indochinese countryside, the crew evaded the Japanese search parties as best they could. Some crewmembers were found by members of the French underground, but Padgett was eventually captured by the Japanese. He was taken to a prison in Hanoi and was tortured by the Kempetai. He spent several weeks in that prison before being transferred south to the Saigon Kempetai prison where he spent the next eight months. On the train journey south, he was reunited with two others from his crew who had been captured then dragged through the countryside in chains. The three men spent the rest of the war in the Saigon prison, starving and wracked with tropical illnesses.

After the war, Padgett spent many months in military hospitals recovering from malaria, beriberi and amoebic dysentery, which he had contracted while a prisoner. He went back to school and earned his law degree from Harvard College in 1948. He and his family moved to Honolulu, Hawaii in 1948, where Padgett was offered a job with the law firm Robertson, Castle and Anthony.

His first case was representing a Shinto shrine in Kalihi Valley on the island of Oahu. The case involved the seizure of the Kotohira Jinsha temple by the federal government's Alien Property Custodian in June 1948 and the subsequent attempt to sell the property in 1949, on the grounds that the Shinto religion was enemy-tainted and associated with emperor worship.

When the case went to trial in 1950, federal judge J. Frank McLaughlin ruled against the government and the land was released back to the members of the Kotohira Jinsha community. In his ruling, Judge McLaughlin found the Attorney General's office in violation of the First Amendment rights of plaintiffs with reference to Robert H. Jackson in "American Communications Association v. Douds". McLaughlin found the Attorney General's office had no evidence to use the Trading with the Enemy Act, moreover, since 1945 Japan had abolished state religion under Douglas MacArthur and by judicial order returned seized property to Kotohira Jinsha.

Padgett went on to practice law in Honolulu for the next thirty years before being appointed to the Hawaii Intermediate Court of Appeals in 1980. In 1982, he was appointed, by then governor George Ariyoshi, to the Hawaii Supreme Court as an associate justice. He served on the court for ten years until his retirement in 1992. He lived in Honolulu with his wife Sibyl. Padgett died there on July 11, 2021, at the age of 98.
