= Derrick Watson =

American judge (born 1966)

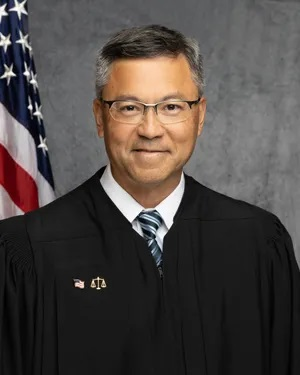

Chief Judge of the United States District Court for the District of Hawaii
- Incumbent
- Assumed office November 6, 2022
- Preceded by: John Michael Seabright

Judge of the United States District Court for the District of Hawaii
- Incumbent
- Assumed office April 23, 2013
- Appointed by: Barack Obama
- Preceded by: David Alan Ezra

Personal details
- Born: Derrick Kahala Watson; 1966 (age 59–60) Honolulu, Hawaii, U.S.
- Education: Harvard University (AB, JD)
- Civilian awards: EPA Bronze Medal for Commendable Service

Military service
- Allegiance: United States
- Branch/service: United States Army • United States Army Reserve
- Years of service: 1998–2006
- Rank: Captain
- Unit: Army Judge Advocate General's Corps
- Military awards: Army Commendation Medal; Army Achievement Medal; National Defense Service Medal; Army Service Ribbon

Derrick Kahala Watson (born 1966) is an American lawyer who serves as the chief United States district judge of the United States District Court for the District of Hawaii.

A native of Hawaii, he graduated from Harvard University and Harvard Law School before entering private practice in San Francisco. He served as a federal prosecutor for some years in California and then Hawaii, rising to become chief of the Civil Division of the U.S. Attorney's Office for the District of Hawaii. He was appointed to the federal bench in 2013 by President Barack Obama and unanimously confirmed by the United States Senate in 2013. Watson is the fourth Native Hawaiian federal judge in U.S. history.

Watson acted against the Trump travel ban in 2017.

== Early life and education ==
Derrick Kahala Watson was born in 1966, in Honolulu, Hawaii, to a Honolulu police officer and a worker at a local bank. He graduated from the Kamehameha Schools in 1984 and received his Bachelor of Arts, cum laude from Harvard University in 1988. Watson was the first in his family to graduate college. Watson received his Juris Doctor from Harvard Law School in 1991, and was admitted to practice law in California the same year. Barack Obama and Neil M. Gorsuch were members of his graduating class.

== Legal career and service in Army Reserves ==
He began his career as an associate at the law firm of Landels, Ripley & Diamond in San Francisco, California, where he worked from 1991 to 1995. He served as an assistant United States attorney in the Northern District of California from 1995 to 2000, serving as deputy chief of the Civil Division from 1999 to 2000. In 2000, Watson returned to private practice, joining the law firm of Farella Braun + Martel LLP, where he worked on product liability, toxic tort, and environmental cost recovery litigation. Watson became a partner at the firm in 2003. While in private practice, Watson conducted substantial pro bono work on behalf of the San Francisco Lawyers' Committee for Civil Rights, he also did pro bono work involving human trafficking and wage and hour claims. Watson served as an assistant United States attorney in the District of Hawaii from 2007 to 2013 and served as chief of the Civil Division from 2009 to 2013. From 1998 to 2006, Watson served in the United States Army Reserve in the Judge Advocate General's Corps, honorably discharged with the rank of captain.

=== Federal judicial service ===
On November 14, 2012, President Barack Obama nominated Watson to serve as a United States district judge of the United States District Court for the District of Hawaii, to the seat vacated by Judge David Alan Ezra, who assumed senior status on June 27, 2012. On January 2, 2013, his nomination was returned to the President, due to the sine die adjournment of the Senate. He was renominated to the same office the next day. Watson was rated "well qualified" by a substantial majority of the American Bar Association's Standing Committee on the Federal Judiciary. Watson encountered no opposition in the Senate Judiciary Committee, which reported his nomination to the Senate floor on February 14, 2013, by voice vote. Watson's nomination was confirmed by a 94–0 vote on April 18, 2013. He received his commission on April 23, 2013. Watson is the fourth Native Hawaiian to serve on the federal bench, and the only currently serving Native Hawaiian judge. Watson became chief judge on November 6, 2022.

=== Travel ban case ===
On March 15, 2017, Watson granted a temporary restraining order blocking President Trump's revised executive order banning entry of nationals of six majority-Muslim countries into the United States from going into effect. Watson held that the order would violate the First Amendment's Establishment Clause in that "a reasonable, objective observer ... would conclude that the Executive Order was issued with a purpose to disfavor a particular religion." Watson justified his opinion by contending that because the intent of Trump's executive order disfavored foreign Muslims, it by extension disfavored domestic Muslims thus violating their First Amendment rights as well.

On March 29, Watson converted the temporary restraining order into a preliminary injunction. On June 12, 2017, the U.S. Court of Appeals for the Ninth Circuit upheld the majority of the injunction, unanimously determining that Trump had "exceeded the scope of authority delegated to the president" under the Immigration and Nationality Act. The United States Supreme Court granted Trump's request to hear the case, setting arguments for October 2017; in the meantime, the Court partially reinstated Trump's executive order for a travel ban on June 26, 2017; the Court "prohibited the government from enforcing the ban against any 'foreign nationals who have a credible claim of a bona fide relationship with a person or entity in the United States,' but they allowed the government to enforce it against travelers who lack such a relationship."

Initially, the Trump administration excluded grandparents, aunts, uncles, and other relations from the exceptions to the travel ban, arguing that they were not "close" relatives. The State of Hawaii filed an emergency motion to clarify the scope of "close familial relationships" under the terms of the injunction and Supreme Court decision narrowing it, asking the district court to rule "that the federal government may not enforce the controversial bans against fiances, grandparents, grandchildren, brothers-in-law, sisters-in-law, aunts, uncles, nieces, nephews and cousins of people currently living in the United States." On July 6, Watson denied the motion, writing that "[t]his Court will not upset the Supreme Court's careful balancing and equitable judgment" and that the State should seek guidance from the Supreme Court. State Attorney General Doug Chin described Watson's action as "procedural" rather than a decision on the merits. Subsequently, the Ninth Circuit ruled that Watson "had the authority to interpret the Supreme Court's order and block any violation of it" and the issue returned to him. On July 13 Watson issued a ruling expanding the class of exemptions from the travel ban. He ordered that the definition of "close family members" be expanded to include grandparents, grandchildren, brothers-in-law, sisters-in-law, aunts, uncles, nieces, nephews, and cousins in the United States. Watson also ruled that refugees who have a formal promise of placement from a U.S. resettlement agency are exempt from the ban. The following day, U.S. Secretary of State Rex Tillerson sent out a diplomatic cable to all U.S. diplomatic posts reflecting Watson's ruling; the cable "reversed the State Department's previous, narrow definition of close family and stated that 'grandparents, grandchildren, brothers-in-law, sisters-in-law, aunts and uncles, nephews and nieces, and cousins' are eligible for visas."

On October 17, 2017, Watson again issued a temporary restraining order preventing a later revision of Trump's travel ban from going into effect. In his decision, Watson prevented the blocking of citizens of Iran, Libya, Syria, Yemen, Somalia, and Chad from traveling to the United States, while leaving intact the restrictions for North Korean citizens and some Venezuelan officials. He argued that the revised ban "suffers from precisely the same maladies as its predecessor".

On June 26, 2018, in Trump v. Hawaii the Supreme Court reversed this decision in a 5–4 decision, ruling that plaintiffs did not have a "likelihood of success on the merits" on either their INA or their Establishment Clause claims. The court vacated the injunction and remanded the case to lower courts for further proceedings.

== Personal life ==
Watson described himself to the Honolulu Star-Advertiser as a political independent.

== See also ==
- List of Asian American jurists

Legal offices
Preceded by David Alan Ezra	Judge of the United States District Court for the District of Hawaii; 2013–present	Incumbent
Preceded by John Michael Seabright	Chief Judge of the United States District Court for the District of Hawaii; 2022–present	Incumbent
