= Delbert E. Metzger =

American judge

Judge of the United States District Court for the Territory of Hawaii
- In office August 25, 1939 – September 5, 1951
- Appointed by: Franklin D. Roosevelt
- Preceded by: Edward Watson Jr.
- Succeeded by: Jon Wiig

Personal details
- Born: Delbert E. Metzger; March 4, 1875 Ozawkie, Kansas, U.S.
- Died: April 24, 1967 Honolulu, Hawaii, U.S.
- Party: Democratic
- Education: Washburn College; Indiana Law School

Delbert E. Metzger (March 4, 1875 - April 24, 1967) was a United States district judge of the United States District Court for the District of Hawaii in the Territory of Hawaii.

== Early life and education ==
Born in Ozawkie, Jefferson County, Kansas. Delbert grew up on the shores of Lake Perry, outside of Topeka, he attended local private and public schools before attending Washburn College in Topeka for a year in 1893–94.

== Career ==
Delbert E. Metzger worked as a realtor, a grain dealer, a newspaper publisher, a theatrical producer, an accountant, a justice of peace, city attorney, and mining engineer.

He volunteered as an engineer in the U.S. Army in the Spanish American War. He served from June 1898 to May 1899 with the 2 U.S. Volunteer Engineers and was a private. In 1899, he was sent to Oahu to complete the first land survey of Pearl Harbor. Metzger remained in Hawaii, drilling artesian wells for Lucius E. Pinkham.

He was a railroad superintendent for the Oahu Railroad. In 1912, he was elected as one of five Senators from the 1st district. He served in the Hawaii Territorial Senate from 1912 to 1915. He later served as a District Magistrate, and Territorial Treasurer.

On July 12, 1934, Metzger was nominated to be a judge on the former 4th Circuit territorial court in Hilo.

== Federal judicial service ==
In 1939, Metzger was nominated by President Franklin D. Roosevelt to a seat on the United States District Court for the District of Hawaii vacated by Judge Edward Minor Watson Jr. He was confirmed by the United States Senate on the same day on August 2, 1939. He was sworn in on August 25, 1939. Metzger was reappointed to additional six year terms until 1952, when he was replaced by John Wiig.

== Post-judicial service ==
He was an unsuccessful candidate for Congress in 1952 and 1954 losing to Republican incumbent Joseph Farrington and Republican candidate and Farrington's widow Elizabeth Farrington respectively.

Legal offices
Preceded by Edward Watson Jr.	United States District Court Judge; 1939–1951	Succeeded by Jon Wiig
