= Ctibor Jech =

Czech ice hockey player

- Born: 28 August 1983 (age 41); Frýdlant, Czechoslovakia
- Height: 6 ft 0 in (183 cm)
- Weight: 196 lb (89 kg; 14 st 0 lb)
- Position: Forward
- Shot: Right
- Played for: HC Bílí Tygři Liberec
- NHL draft: Undrafted
- Playing career: 2002–2014

Ctibor Jech (born 28 August 1983) is a Czech former professional ice hockey player who played mainly with HC Bílí Tygři Liberec in the Czech Extraliga.

His father of the same name has been a staff member (coach and general manager) at the Liberec club since the 1980s.
