= Walter Plywaski =

Polish-American Holocaust educator and secularism activist

- Born: Wladyslaw Plywacki; August 10, 1929; Łódź, Poland
- Died: January 28, 2021 (aged 91); Boulder, Colorado, United States
- Occupation: Electrical engineer
- Known for: Holocaust education

Walter Plywaski (August 10, 1929 – January 28, 2021) was a Polish-born Holocaust survivor who emigrated to the United States after World War II. He established a legal precedent allowing immigrants to the country to make a secular affirmation as an alternative to the Oath of Allegiance and received the Order of Merit of the Republic of Poland for his role as a Holocaust educator.

== Childhood in Poland ==
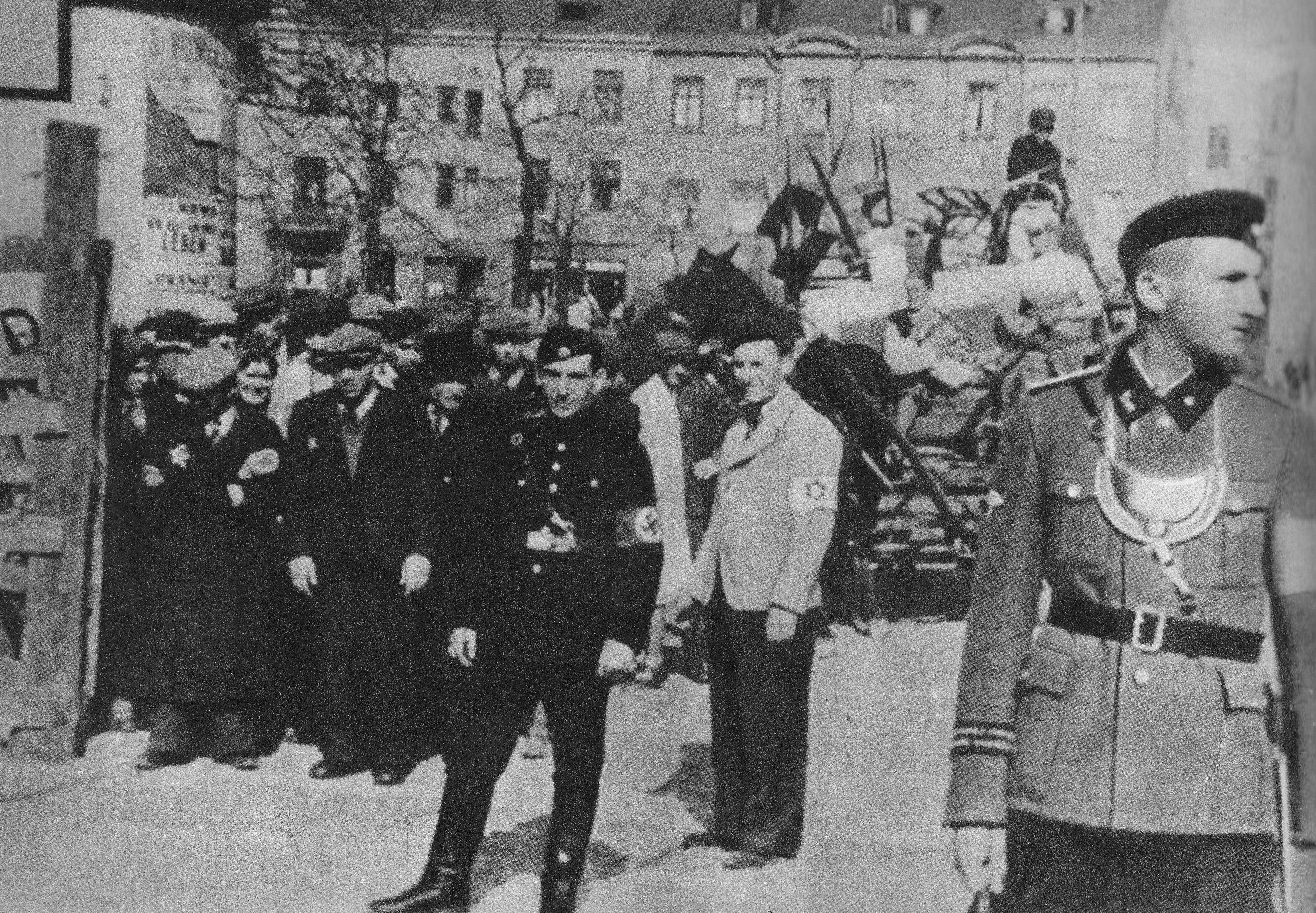
Entrance of the Łódź Ghetto, 1941

Plywaski grew up in a Jewish family living in the Polish city of Łódź. He was 10 years old when in World War II, the occupying German forces established the Łódź Ghetto. When their provisions ran out, the family surrendered to the German occupation forces in 1944, and they were sent to the Auschwitz-Birkenau concentration camp. Transferred from one camp to another, he ended the war at the camp near Dachau, while his parents had perished.

== Immigration to the U.S. and Oath of Allegiance ruling ==
After breaking out of Dachau while it was being liberated by the U.S. military, Plywaski worked as an interpreter for the American forces until 1947. He immigrated to the United States and worked a variety of jobs, from lumberjack to welder, living in Oregon and California. He served in the American air forces for four years, then studied at Oregon State University, earning a degree in electrical engineering. He worked at the National Oceanic and Atmospheric Administration for 18 years before founding his own electronics firm.

When he became an American citizen in 1952, Plywaski requested an alternative to the Oath of Allegiance: as an atheist, he could not sincerely use an oath ending with "so help me God". While Americans could refuse to swear on the Bible for "religious reasons", Plywaski, as an atheist insisted on refusing to swear on the Bible for non-religious reasons. When the citizenship judge turned down his request, support from the American Civil Liberties Union allowed him to appeal the decision. He won the appeal in Oregon in 1955 and was allowed to complete the citizenship process.

The landmark ruling of Plywaski's religious freedom case established that persons who apply for citizenship in the United States must have a non-religious alternative to the oath, a policy that is still in place as of 2021.

== Later life and death ==
Plywaski talked about his experiences during The Holocaust throughout his life, to groups at schools and universities, as well as in documentary films. In 2013, he received Knight's Cross of Merit, for educating the public about the German occupation of Poland.

He married and raised three daughters in Colorado. Plywaski lost his Sugarloaf home to a major wildfire in 2010. He played chess and learned six languages throughout his life.

Plywaski had Parkinson's disease in his later years and died from complications of COVID-19 in Boulder, Colorado, on January 28, 2021, at the age of 91.
