= Hawaii Kotohira Jinsha – Hawaii Dazaifu Tenmangu =

Shinto shrine in Honolulu, Hawaii, U.S.

Coordinates: 21.3283°N 157.8692°W

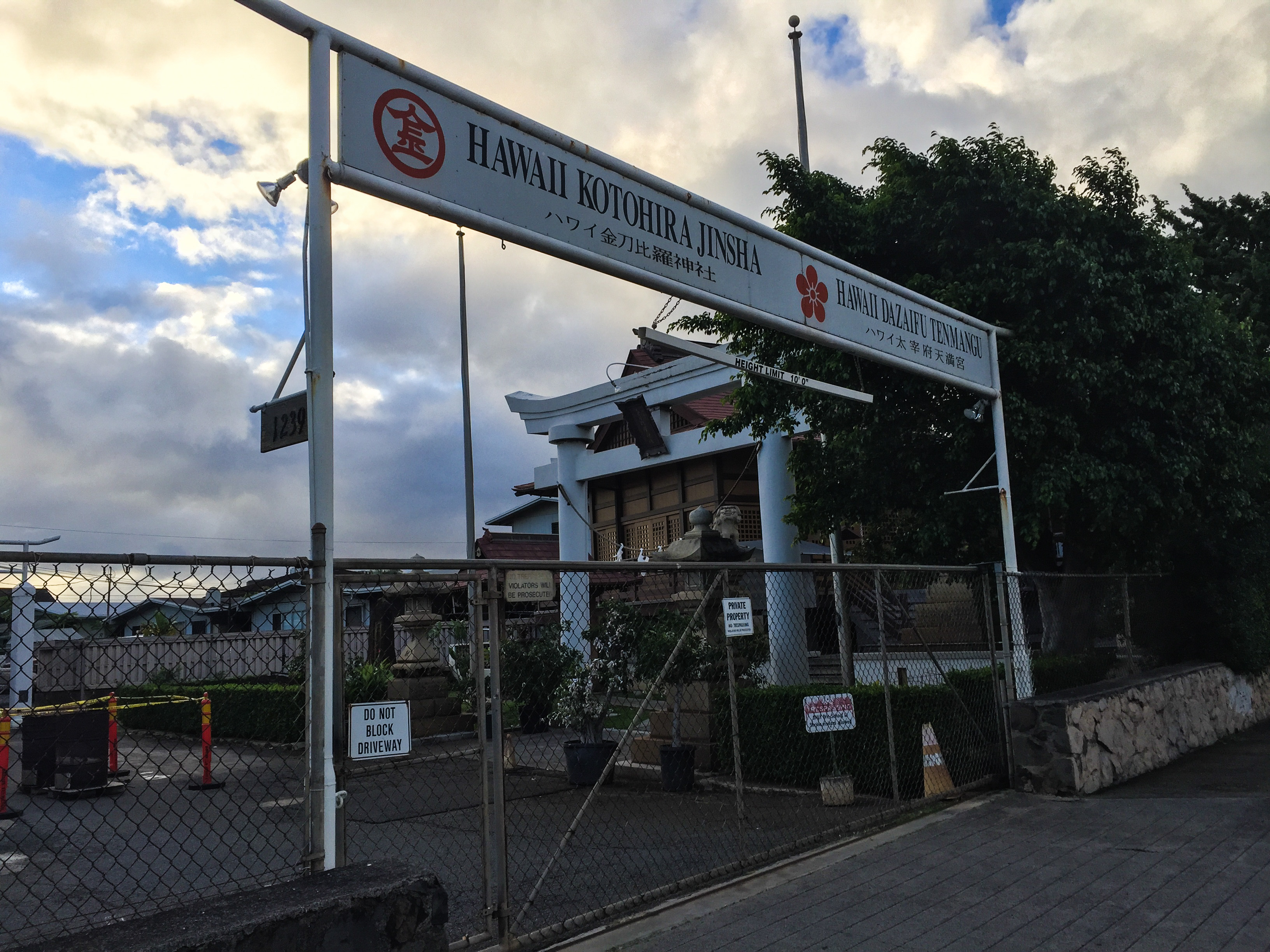
Hawaii Kotohira Jinsha – Hawaii Dazaifu Tenmangu

Hawaii Kotohira Jinsha – Hawaii Dazaifu Tenmangu (Japanese: ハワイ金刀比羅神社・ハワイ大宰府天満宮) is a Shinto shrine established in Honolulu, Hawaii in 1924. It traces its origins to Honolulu's Japanese fishing community in the early 1920s and is notable for Kotohira Jinsha v. McGrath, a 1950 federal case that returned the shrine's property after a government seizure.

An annual blessing of animals is undertaken at the shrine.

== History ==
The shrine traces its origins to the early 1920s, when Itsuki Hirota and associates in Honolulu's Japanese fishing community established Hawaii Kotohira Shrine. It purchased land in 1931 and moved there in 1932, and by 1941 it had grown into the largest Shinto shrine in Hawaii. On June 1, 1948, the federal government vested the shrine's property; in 1950, the United States District Court for the District of Hawaii ordered the property returned, finding that the vesting unduly infringed a freedom protected by the First Amendment. In 1952, the shrine received the divided spirit of Dazaifu Tenmangu from Fukuoka and adopted its current combined name.
