= Dick Yin Wong =

American judge

Judge of the United States District Court for the District of Hawaii
- In office April 25, 1975 – December 26, 1978
- Appointed by: Gerald Ford
- Preceded by: Martin Pence
- Succeeded by: Walter Heen

Personal details
- Born: Dick Yin Wong; September 20, 1920 Honolulu, Territory of Hawaii, U.S.
- Died: December 26, 1978 (aged 58) Honolulu, Hawaii
- Education: University of Hawaiʻi (B.A., M.A.); Northwestern University Pritzker School of Law (J.D.)

Dick Yin Wong (September 13, 1920 – December 26, 1978) was a United States district judge of the United States District Court for the District of Hawaii.

== Education and career ==
Wong was born on September 13, 1920, in Honolulu, Hawaii. He received a Bachelor of Arts degree from the University of Hawaiʻi in 1942. He received a Master of Arts degree from the University of Hawaiʻi in 1944. He received a Juris Doctor from Northwestern University Pritzker School of Law in 1950. He was in the United States Army as a staff sergeant from 1945 to 1947. He was an accountant in Chicago, Illinois, from 1947 to 1949. He was in private practice of law in Honolulu, from 1950 to 1951, from 1960 to 1961, from 1962 to 1968 and from 1973 to 1975. He was an accountant in Honolulu, from 1951 to 1961 and from 1962 to 1968. He was a Judge of the Hawaii Tax Appeal Court, from 1960 to 1968. He was a Judge of the First Circuit Court of Hawaii, from 1968 to 1973.

== Federal judicial service ==
Wong was nominated by President Gerald Ford on March 17, 1975, to a seat on the United States District Court for the District of Hawaii vacated by Judge Martin Pence. He was confirmed by the United States Senate on April 24, 1975, and received his commission on April 25, 1975. His service was terminated on December 26, 1978, due to his death.

== See also ==
- List of Asian American jurists
- List of first minority male lawyers and judges in the United States
- List of first minority male lawyers and judges in Hawaii

== Sources ==
Legal offices
| Preceded by Martin Pence | Judge of the United States District Court for the District of Hawaii; 1975–1978 | Succeeded by Walter Heen |
