= Walter Heen =

American judge and politician

Judge of the United States District Court for the District of Hawaii
- In office January 1, 1981 – December 16, 1981
- Appointed by: Jimmy Carter
- Preceded by: Dick Yin Wong
- Succeeded by: Harold Fong

Personal details
- Born: Walter Meheula Heen; April 17, 1928 (age 98) Honolulu, Territory of Hawaii, U.S.
- Education: University of Hawaiʻi (BA); Georgetown University (JD)

Walter Meheula Heen (born April 17, 1928) is an American lawyer, politician and judge. He briefly served as a United States district judge of the United States District Court for the District of Hawaii and trustee of the Office of Hawaiian Affairs.

== Early life and education ==
Born in Honolulu, Territory of Hawaii, Heen received a Bachelor of Arts degree from the University of Hawaiʻi in 1953. His grandfather, Harry A. Heen, was born Chung Mook-heen in Qing Dynasty China near the Xi River in Guangdong and came to what was then the Hawaiian Kingdom at age 17. He received a Juris Doctor from the Georgetown University Law Center in 1955.

== Career ==
Heen was in private practice of law in Honolulu from 1955 to 1972. He was a deputy city attorney of Honolulu from 1957 to 1958. He was a Member of the Territorial House of Representatives of Hawaii in 1959. He was a Member of the Hawaii House of Representatives from 1959 to 1964. He was a Member of the Hawaii Senate from 1966 to 1968. He was a Member of the Honolulu City Council from 1969 to 1972, serving as chairman from 1969 to 1970. He was a Judge of the Hawaii District Court for the First Circuit from 1972 to 1974. He was a Judge of the Hawaii Circuit Court for the First Circuit from 1974 to 1978. He was the United States Attorney for the District of Hawaii from 1978 to 1980.

=== Federal judicial service ===
Heen received a recess appointment from President Jimmy Carter on January 1, 1981, to a seat on the United States District Court for the District of Hawaii vacated by Judge Dick Yin Wong. He was nominated to the same seat on January 8, 1981. His service was terminated on December 16, 1981, after his nomination was not confirmed by the United States Senate.

=== Later service ===
Heen was an Associate Judge of the Hawaii Intermediate Court of Appeals from 1982 to 1994. From 1998 to 2001, Heen served as chair of the Democratic Party of Hawaiʻi. He was elected in 2006 as a trustee of the Office of Hawaiian Affairs representing Oʻahu. He ran for re-election in November 2010, but lost to Peter Apo.

== See also ==
- List of Asian American jurists

Legal offices
Preceded by Dick Yin Wong	Judge of the United States District Court for the District of Hawaii; 1981	Succeeded by Harold Fong
