= United States v. Texas (2024) =

- Court: United States Court of Appeals for the Fifth Circuit
- Full case name: United States of America v. The State of Texas, Greg Abbott, Texas Department of Public Safety, and Steven McCraw
- Argued: March 20, 2024

United States v. Texas, et al. (Note: Decided with Las Americas Immigrant Advocacy Center, et al. v. McCraw and Hicks.) is a court case in the United States Court of Appeals for the Fifth Circuit regarding Texas Senate Bill 4 (S.B. 4), a Texas statute allowing state officials to arrest and deport migrants. The Biden administration, the county of El Paso, and two civil rights organizations petitioned the U.S. Supreme Court to vacate the stay of the lower court's preliminary injunction of S.B. 4. Texas governor Greg Abbott argued that the bill was supported by a clause in the Constitution forbidding states from declaring war unless an invasion occurs. The U.S. Supreme Court denied the application to vacate on March 19, 2024. On March 26, 2024, the Fifth Circuit denied Texas’s motion for a stay of the preliminary injunction pending appeal.

== Background ==
=== Texas immigration law ===
In December 2023, Texas governor Greg Abbott signed S.B. 4, allowing state officials to arrest and deport migrants. S.B. 4 prohibited noncitizens from illegally entering or reentering the state and established removal procedures. The United States, two non-profit organizations, and the county of El Paso sued at the United States District Court for the Western District of Texas to enjoin Texas from enforcing S. B. 4., arguing that it was preempted by federal law. Texas' reasoning in their argument to arrest illegal immigrants was that they feared "invasion" might occur in the state, therefore giving them power to deport immigrants. The case is on hold, meaning immigrants technically should not be arrested, but Texas argues that because they are a state, they have certain powers to protect their territory. People disagree with this idea because immigration is controlled by the federal (national) government, therefore, Texas can be seen as overstepping its jurisdiction. The Supreme Court granted Texas the ability to enforce S.B. 4, but only for a short time because they were still deciding whether or not it was legal for Texas to create its own immigration law, and the case not only impacted the year 2024, but it continued to impact the years 2025 and 2026. Yes, the case began in 2024, but during the years 2025 and 2026 courts still have no answer to whether or not Texas can continue enforcing immigration laws and influence how immigration arrests were being managed. This left people uncertain and scared to the idea of being at risk for deportation. The point of this case is to determine if the state or federal has the authority to arrest immigrants. Due to the case being on hold, it allowed Texas to increase its immigration arrests. During the time Texas was arresting immigrants, so was the U.S. Immigration and Customs Enforcement agency, known as ICE, during Trump's immigration crackdown. This confused the public because they did not know whether ICE agency had the power to arrest immigrants or whether state officials in Texas had the power as well. Overall, the case is not on hold anymore since April 24, 2026. The court lifted the preliminary injunction, which means that state officials such as Texas officials can now arrest any illegal migrants that are crossing the border.

=== Procedural history ===
The district court granted a preliminary injunction. Texas appealed and filed a motion to stay the injunction pending appeal. The Fifth Circuit issued an administrative stay of the district court’s injunction. On March 19, 2024, the U.S. Supreme Court allowed Texas to enforce S.B. 4 pending appeal. That same day, the Fifth Circuit lifted its administrative stay and on March 20, 2024, heard oral argument on Texas' motion to stay the injunction pending appeal. On March 18, 2025, the Trump administration dismissed the US government's complaint against Texas without prejudice, leaving the nonprofits and El Paso County as the remaining plaintiffs.

== Opinion of the Court ==
The Fifth Circuit denied Texas’s motion for a stay pending appeal because Texas had not shown it was likely to succeed on the merits.

The court found that the federal government has broad and exclusive power over immigration, including the entry and removal of noncitizens. The court also noted that the Texas law interfered with the federal government's foreign policy objectives and could lead to international friction and potentially take the United States out of compliance with its treaty obligations.

On July 3, 2025, citing much the same reasoning, the Fifth Circuit affirmed the district court's preliminary injunction.
