= United States District Court for the District of Hawaii =

United States federal court of the 9th circuit

Coordinates: 21.304175°N 157.862334°W

- (D. Haw.)
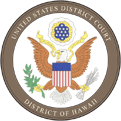

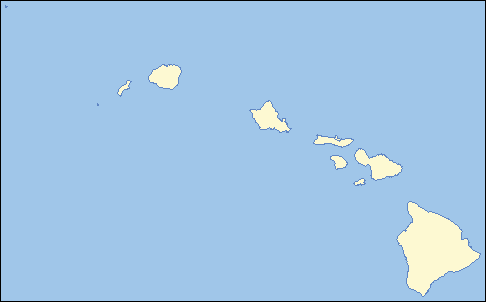
- Location: Prince Kuhio Federal Building (Honolulu)
- Appeals to: Ninth Circuit
- Established: August 21, 1959
- Judges: 4
- Chief Judge: Derrick Watson

Officers of the court
- U.S. Attorney: Ken Sorenson
- U.S. Marshal: Justin Mark Davis (acting)
- www.hid.uscourts.gov

The United States District Court for the District of Hawaii (in case citations, D. Haw.) is the principal trial court of the United States Federal Court System in the state of Hawaii. The court's territorial jurisdiction encompasses the state of Hawaii and the territories of Midway Atoll, Wake Island, Johnston Atoll, Kingman Reef, Palmyra Atoll, Baker Island, Howland Island, and Jarvis Island; it also occasionally handles (jointly with the United States District Court for the District of Columbia and the High Court of American Samoa) federal issues that arise in the territory of American Samoa, which has no local federal court or territorial court. Additionally, it oversees U.S. law enforcement in Antarctica, and exercises jurisdiction over crimes committed by American citizens while on the continent. It is located at the Prince Kuhio Federal Building in downtown Honolulu, fronting the Aloha Tower and Honolulu Harbor. The court hears both civil and criminal cases as a court of law and equity. A branch of the district court is the United States Bankruptcy Court which also has chambers in the federal building. The United States Court of Appeals for the Ninth Circuit has appellate jurisdiction over cases coming out of the District of Hawaii (except for patent claims and claims against the U.S. government under the Tucker Act, which are appealed to the Federal Circuit). The United States Attorney for the District of Hawaii represents the United States in all civil and criminal cases within her district.

As of February 21, 2025, the United States attorney is Ken Sorenson.

== History ==
When the Territory of Hawaii was formed in 1900, jurisdiction was placed in the Ninth Circuit. On March 18, 1959, when the District of Hawaii was formed, the district had two judgeships for the court. On July 10, 1984, a third judgeship was added, and a fourth was added on December 1, 1990.

== Current judges ==
As of December 19, 2025:

#	Title	Judge	Duty station	Born	Term of service			Appointed by
#	Title	Judge	Duty station	Born	Active	Chief	Senior	Appointed by
13	Chief Judge	Derrick Watson	Honolulu	1966	2013–present	2022–present	—	Obama
14	District Judge	Jill Otake	Honolulu	1973	2018–present	—	—	Trump
15	District Judge	Micah W. J. Smith	Honolulu	1981	2024–present	—	—	Biden
16	District Judge	Shanlyn A. S. Park	Honolulu	1969	2024–present	—	—	Biden
8	Senior Judge	David Alan Ezra	San Antonio, Texas (Note: Judge Ezra has sat with the Western District of Texas since taking senior status.)	1947	1988–2012	1999–2005	2012–present	Reagan
9	Senior Judge	Helen W. Gillmor	Honolulu	1942	1994–2009	2005–2009	2009–present	Clinton
10	Senior Judge	Susan Oki Mollway	inactive	1950	1998–2015	2009–2015	2015–present	Clinton
11	Senior Judge	John Michael Seabright	Honolulu	1959	2005–2024	2015–2022	2024–present	G.W. Bush
12	Senior Judge	Leslie E. Kobayashi	Honolulu	1957	2010–2024	—	2024–present	Obama

== Former judges ==
#	Judge	Born–died	Active service	Chief Judge	Senior status	Appointed by	Reason for termination
1	Cyrus Nils Tavares	1902–1976	1960–1972 (Note: Recess appointment; formally nominated on January 10, 1961, confirmed by the Senate on September 21, 1961, and received commission on September 22, 1961.)	1960–1961	1972–1976	Eisenhower	death
2	Martin Pence	1904–2000	1961–1974	1961–1974	1974–2000	Kennedy	retirement
3	Samuel Pailthorpe King	1916–2010	1972–1984	1974–1984	1984–2010	Nixon	death
4	Dick Yin Wong	1920–1978	1975–1978	—	—	Ford	death
5	Walter Heen	1928–present	1981 (Note: Recess appointment made by President Carter; President Reagan later withdrew the nomination before the Senate could act.)	—	—	Carter	not confirmed
6	Harold Fong	1938–1995	1982–1995	1984–1991	—	Reagan	death
7	Alan Cooke Kay	1932–2024	1986–2000	1991–1999	2000–2024	Reagan	death

== Chief judges ==
Chief judges have administrative responsibilities with respect to their district court. Unlike the Supreme Court, where one justice is specifically nominated to be chief, the office of chief judge rotates among the district court judges. To be chief, a judge must have been in active service on the court for at least one year, be under the age of 65, and have not previously served as chief judge.

A vacancy is filled by the judge highest in seniority among the group of qualified judges. The chief judge serves for a term of seven years, or until age 70, whichever occurs first. The age restrictions are waived if no members of the court would otherwise be qualified for the position.

When the office was created in 1948, the chief judge was the longest-serving judge who had not elected to retire, on what has since 1958 been known as senior status, or declined to serve as chief judge. After August 6, 1959, judges could not become or remain chief after turning 70 years old. The current rules have been in operation since October 1, 1982.

== Succession of seats ==
Seat 1
Seat established on August 21, 1959 by 73 Stat. 4
Tavares	1961–1972
King	1972–1984
Ezra	1988–2012
Watson	2013–present

Seat 2
Seat established on August 21, 1959 by 73 Stat. 4
Pence	1961–1974
Wong	1975–1978
Heen	1981
Fong	1982–1995
Mollway	1998–2015
Otake	2018–present

Seat 3
Seat established on July 10, 1984 by 98 Stat. 333
Kay	1986–2000
Seabright	2005–2024
Smith	2024–present

Seat 4
Seat established on December 1, 1990 by 104 Stat. 5089 (temporary)
Gillmor	1994–2009
Kobayashi	2010–2024
Seat made permanent on December 23, 2024 by 138 Stat. 2693
Park	2024–present

== Judges of the United States District Court for the Territory of Hawaii ==
Prior to 1959, the United States District Court for the District of Hawaii was an Article IV tribunal in the Territory of Hawaii. The following is a partial list of Judges for that court.

#	Judge	Born–died	Active service	Chief Judge	Senior status	Appointed by	Reason for termination
1	Morris M. Estee	1833–1903	1900–1903	—	—	McKinley	death
2	Sanford B. Dole	1844–1926	1903–1915	—	—	T. Roosevelt	retirement
3	George Washington Woodruff	1864–1934	1909–1910	—	—	Taft	resigned
4	Alexander George Morison Robertson	1867–1947	1910–1911	—	—	Taft	resigned
5	Charles Frederic Clemons	1871–1925	1911–1916	—	—	Taft	resigned
6	Horace Worth Vaughan	1867–1922	1916–1922	—	—	Wilson	death
7	Joseph Poindexter	1869–1951	1917–1924	—	—	Wilson	retirement
8	John T. DeBolt	1857–1944	1922–1926	—	—	Harding	term expired
9	William T. Rawlins	1877–1928	1924–1928	—	—	Coolidge	death
10	William Barker Lymer	1882–1939	1926–1934	—	—	Coolidge	retirement
11	Edward K. Massee	1871–1960	1929–1935	—	—	Coolidge	term expired
12	Seba Cormany Huber	1871–1944	1934–1940	—	—	F. Roosevelt	retirement
13	Edward Minor Watson Jr.	1874–1938	1935–1938	—	—	F. Roosevelt	death
14	Delbert E. Metzger	1875–1967	1939–1952	—	—	F. Roosevelt	term expired
15	Ingram Stainback	1883–1961	1940–1943	—	—	F. Roosevelt	resigned
16	Joseph Frank McLaughlin	1908–1962	1943–1959	—	—	F. Roosevelt	statehood
17	Jon Wiig	1906–1987	1952–1959	—	—	Truman	statehood

== Succession of seats ==
Seat 1
Seat established on April 30, 1900 by 56 Stat. 222
Estee	1900–1903
Dole	1903–1915
Vaughan	1916–1922
DeBolt	1922–1926
Lymer	1926–1934
Huber	1934–1940
Stainback	1940–1943
McLaughlin	1943–1959

Seat 2
Seat established on March 3, 1909 by 60 Stat. 322
Woodruff	1909–1910
Robertson	1910–1911
Clemons	1911–1916
Poindexter	1917–1924
Rawlins	1924–1928
Massee	1929–1935
Watson	1935–1938
Metzger	1939–1952
Wiig	1952–1959

== "Recorder of Deeds" for the Territory of Palmyra Island ==
Since 1962, the court's clerk has filed or recorded the deeds and other land title documents for land located in the federal Territory of Palmyra Island, under 48 U.S.C. § 644a, Executive Order No. 10967 and Order No. 2862 of the Secretary of the Interior.

== See also ==
- Courts of Hawaii
- List of current United States district judges
- List of United States federal courthouses in Hawaii
- United States Court of Appeals for the Ninth Circuit
