= List of Asian American jurists =

This is a dynamic list of Asian Americans who are or were judges, magistrate judges, court commissioners, or administrative law judges. If known, it will be listed if a judge has served on multiple courts.

Judge	Court/agency and years of service (if known)	State/territory	Status	Notes
Kazuhisa Abe	Kohala district Magistrate (1940–1945); Supreme Court of Hawaii (1967–1973)	Hawaii	deceased	
Maha-Rebekah Abejuela	Fairfax County Juvenile and Domestic Relations District Court (2019– )	Virginia	active	First Female Asian American judge in VA
Peter Aduja	Hawaii First Circuit Court (1960–1962)	Hawaii	deceased	
Tony Agbayani	San Joaquin County Superior Court (2007– )	California	active	
Alok Ahuja	Missouri Court of Appeals, Western District (2007– )	Missouri	active	
Jeevan S. Ahuja	California Unemployment Insurance Appeals Board	California	active	
John F. Aiso	Superior Court of Los Angeles County (1957–1968); California Court of Appeal, 2nd District (1968–1972)	California	deceased	First Japanese American judge in the continental U.S.
Kathryn Akao	Superior Court of Santa Cruz County (1994–2005)	California	deceased	
Benes Z. Aldana	Coast Guard Court of Criminal Appeals (2005–2017 )	Washington, D.C.	retired	First Asian Pacific American (Filipino) chief trial judge in the U.S. military
Loren AliKhan	District of Columbia Court of Appeals (2022–2023); United States District Court for the District of Columbia (2024– )	Washington, D.C.	active	
Shahabuddeen Ally	New York City Civil Court (2019– ) Acting New York Supreme Court Justice (2023–)	New York City	active	
Ramon Alvarado	Gwinnett County Recorder's Court (2019–2020)	Georgia	deceased	
Deepa Ambekar	Criminal Court of the City of New York (2018– )	New York City	active	
Susan H. Amini	King County Superior Court (2013– )	Washington	active	
Justin Anand	Magistrate Judge for the Northern District of Georgia (2012– )	Georgia	active	
Marcine Anderson	King County District Court (2010–2023)	Washington	left office	
Akemi D. Arakaki	Los Angeles County Superior Court (2010– )	California	active	
Jacqueline M. Arroyo	Superior Court of Santa Clara County (2008– )	California	active	
Rahat N. Babar	Superior Court of New Jersey (2022–2023)	New Jersey	retired	
Rita L. Badhan	Los Angeles County Superior Court (2020– )	California	active	
Judy Bae	San Diego County Superior Court (2019– )	California	active	
Paul W. Baelly	Ventura County Superior Court (Commissioner: 2017–2020; Judge: 2020– )	California	active	
Eugene Balonon	Superior Court of Sacramento County (2005–2021)	California	retired	
Thang Nguyen Barrett	Superior Court of Santa Clara County (1997– )	California	active	
David F. Bauman	New Jersey Superior Court, Monmouth County (2008–2024)	New Jersey	retired	
Michael Isaku Begert	Superior Court of San Francisco County (2010– )	California	active	
Riko E. Bishop	Nebraska Court of Appeals (2013– )	Nebraska	active	
Cathy Bissoon	United States District Court for the Western District of Pennsylvania (2011– )	Pennsylvania	active	
Cliff Blakely	Alameda County Superior Court (2018– )	California	active	
Alicia Yoko Blanco	Los Angeles County Superior Court (Commissioner: 2015–2020; Judge: 2020– )	California	active	
Frances Bourliot	Texas Court of Appeals (2018– )	Texas	active	
Tracie L. Brown	Superior Court of San Francisco County (2013–2018); California Court of Appeal, 1st District (2018– )	California	active	
Brianne J. Buccicone	Minnesota Tenth Judicial District (2017– )	Minnesota	active	
Tam Bui	Everett District Court (2006– )	Washington	active	
Sanket J. Bulsara	United States District Court for the Eastern District of New York (2017– )	New York	active	
Patrick J. Bumatay	United States Court of Appeals for the Ninth Circuit (2019– )	California	active	
Susan N. Burke	Hennepin County District Court (2005– )	Minnesota	active	
Tani Cantil-Sakauye	Superior Court of Sacramento County (1997–2005); California Third District Court of Appeal (2005–2010); California Supreme Court (2010–2023)	California	retired	First Filipino and first Woman of Color California Chief Justice
Corie J. Caraway	Butte County Superior Court (2020– )	California	active	
Bruce Chan	Superior Court of San Francisco County (2004– )	California	active	
Derrick H.M. Chan	Hawaii Intermediate Court of Appeals (2017– )	Hawaii	active	
Jason Chan	Massachusetts District Court (2022– )	Massachusetts	active	
Margaret A. Chan	Supreme Court of the State of New York, New York County (2012 - 2025); Appellate Division, First Department (2026 – )	New York	active	
Roger Chan	Superior Court of San Francisco County (2016– )	California	active	
Adam Chang	Los Angeles County Superior Court (2020– )	California	active	
Edmond E. Chang	United States District Court for the Northern District of Illinois (2010– )	Illinois	active	
Gail Chang Bohr	Ramsey County District Court (2009–2014)	Minnesota	retired	
James Chang	Santa Clara Municipal Court (1983–1989); Superior Court of Santa Clara County (1989–2003)	California	retired	
Kevin S. C. Chang	United States District Court for the District of Hawaii (2000–2019)	Hawaii	retired	
Shellyanne W.L. Chang	Superior Court of Sacramento County (2002– )	California	active	
S. Raj Chatterjee	Alameda County Superior Court (2017– )	California	active	
Ed Chau	Los Angeles County Superior Court (2021– )	California	active	
Ken H. Chau	Administrative Law Judge, Social Security	Missouri	active	
Manjari Chawla	State Bar Court of California (San Francisco; 2018– )	California	active	
Meng Li Che	Board of Industrial Insurance Appeals (2010–2023); Washington Court of Appeals (2023– )	Washington	active	
Edward M. Chen	U.S. Magistrate Judge (2001–2011); United States District Court for the Northern District of California (2011– )	California	active	<
Faye Chen Barnouw	Los Angeles County Superior Court (2025– )	California	active	
Frank W. Chen	Los Angeles County Superior Court (Commissioner: 2019–2024 )	California	deceased	
Ida K. Chen	Philadelphia Court of Common Pleas, First Judicial District Pennsylvania (1988– )	Pennsylvania	active	
Pamela K. Chen	United States District Court for the Eastern District of New York (2013– )	New York	active	
Raymond T. Chen	United States Court of Appeals for the Federal Circuit (2013– )	Washington, D.C.	active	
Andrew Y.S. Cheng	San Francisco County Superior Court (2009– )	California	active	
David Wellington Chew	Texas Courts of Appeals, 8th District (1995–2011)	Texas	retired	
Alberta Chew	Superior Court of Solano County (Commissioner: 1994–2008)	California	retired	
Linda Chew	Texas District Court, 327th Judicial District (2002–2022)	Texas	retired	
Vince Chhabria	United States District Court for the Northern District of California (2014– )	California	active	
Jennifer C. Chiang	Sugar Land Municipal Court (2015– )	Texas	active	
Andrea Chin	Seattle Municipal Court (2019– )	Washington	active	
Denny Chin	United States District Court for the Southern District of New York (1994–2010); United States Court of Appeals for the Second Circuit (2010– )	New York	active	
Jason Chin	Alameda County Superior Court (2018– )	California	active	
Ming Chin	Alameda County Superior Court (1988–1990); California First District Court of Appeal (1990–1996); California Supreme Court (1996–2020)	California	retired	
Richard J. Chin	Boston Municipal Court (1989–1993); Massachusetts Superior Court (1993–2019)	Massachusetts	retired	
Dorothy Chin-Brandt	New York Supreme Court, Queens County (2001–2017)	New York	retired	
Hideo Chino	San Diego County Superior Court (Commissioner:1986–2008)	California	deceased	
Lawrence Cho	Los Angeles County Superior Court (2005– )	California	active	
Tony Cho	Los Angeles County Superior Court (2019– )	California	active	
Jennifer Choe-Groves	United States Court of International Trade (2016– )	New York	active	
Danny Chou	San Mateo County Superior Court (2017– )	California	active	
James Chou	Marin County Superior Court (2010– )	California	active	
Nusrat Jahan Choudhury	United States District Court for the Eastern District of New York (2023– )	New York	active	
Herbert Choy	United States Court of Appeals for the Ninth Circuit (1971–2004)	Hawaii	deceased	First Korean American U.S. federal judge
Kenneth Chu	Administrative Law Judge, National Labor Relations Board (2012– )	New York	active	
Regina M. Chu	Minnesota Fourth Judicial District (2002–2022) Senior Judge (2023– )	Minnesota	Senior	
Theodore D. Chuang	United States District Court for the District of Maryland (2014– )	Maryland	active	
A. Marisa Chun	San Francisco County Superior Court (2021– )	California	active	
Danny K. Chun	New York Supreme Court, Kings County (2005– )	New York	active	
John H. Chun	King County Superior Court (2014–2018); Washington Court of Appeals (2018–2022); United States District Court for the Western District of Washington (2022– )	Washington	active	
Charles Carlos Chung	Los Angeles County Superior Court (2006– )	California	active	
Cindy K. Chung	United States Court of Appeals for the Third Circuit (2023– )	Pennsylvania	active	
Frederick Chung	Santa Clara County Superior Court (2018– )	California	active	
Jo-Ann Chung	Anchorage Superior Court (2011– )	Alaska	active	
Lisa Chung	Los Angeles County Superior Court (2003– )	California	active	
Robert E. Chung	Seattle Municipal Court	Washington	active	
Samuel Chung	King County Superior Court (2014– )	Washington	active	
Maria Kuriakos Ciesel	Cook County Circuit Court (2007– )	Illinois	active	
Ramiro P. Cisneros	Los Angeles County Superior Court (2021– )	California	active	
Linda W.Y. Coburn	Washington Court of Appeals (2020– )	Washington	active	
Dena M. Coggins	Sacramento County Superior Court (2021–2024); United States District Court for the Eastern District of California (2024– )	California	active	
Rabeea Sultan Collier	Harris County District Court (2019– )	Texas	active	
Jamie L. Cork	Minnesota First Judicial District (2016– )	Minnesota	active	
Patricia Yim Cowett	San Diego Municipal Court (1979–1998); San Diego County Superior Court (1998–2008)	California	retired	
Johanna Thai Van Dat	Santa Clara County Superior Court (Commissioner) (2022– )	California	active	
Susan K. DeClercq	United States District Court for the Eastern District of Michigan (2023– )	Michigan	active	
Dipti Vaid Dedhia	Edison Municipal Court (2022– )	New Jersey	active	First South Asian Female Judge in New Jersey
Roger DeHoog	Oregon Supreme Court (2022– )	Oregon	active	
Roopali Desai	United States Court of Appeals for the Ninth Circuit (2022– )	Arizona	active	
Israel Abaya Desierto	Cook County Circuit Court, District 1 (2005– )	Illinois	active	
Kuljinder Dhillon	King County District Court (2021– )	Washington	active	
Truc Do	San Diego County Superior Court (2018–2021); California Court of Appeals, Fourth District (2021– )	California	active	First Vietnamese American Judge in San Diego
Gregory Dohi	Los Angeles County Superior Court (2007– )	California	active	
Chanpone Sinlapasai	Multnomah County Circuit Court (2021– )	Oregon	active	
David Doi	Los Angeles Municipal Court Judge (1983–2000); Los Angeles County Superior Court (2000–2006 )	California	deceased	
Nelson Doi	Hawaii State Circuit Courts (1970–1975)	Hawaii	deceased	Former Lt Governor of Hawaii
Miranda Du	United States District Court for the District of Nevada (2012– )	Nevada	active	
Fernande R. V. Duffly	Massachusetts Probate & Family Court (1992–2000); Massachusetts Appeals Court (2000–2010); Massachusetts Supreme Judicial Court (2010–2016)	Massachusetts	retired	First Asian-American Massachusetts Supreme Court justice
Jacqueline My-Le Duong	Santa Clara County Superior Court (2007– )	California	active	
Wendy Duong	Houston Municipal Court (1991–1994)	Texas	retired	First Vietnamese American in the U.S.
Nina F. Elgo	Connecticut Superior Court (2004–2017); Connecticut Appellate Court (2017– )	Connecticut	active	
Randall T. Eng	New York Supreme Court, Appellate Division, Second Department (2012– )	New York	active	
Alison Matsumoto Estrada	Los Angeles County Superior Court (2015– )	California	active	
Samuel Feng	San Francisco County Superior Court (2009– )	California	active	
Harold Fong	United States District Court for the District of Hawaii (1982–1995)	Hawaii	deceased	
Keith Fong	Alameda County Superior Court (2021– )	California	active	
Keith Fudenna	Alameda County Superior Court (1997– )	California	retired	
John Fugh	Judge Advocate General of the U.S. Army (1991–1993)	Washington, D.C.	retired	First Asian American Judge Advocate General of the U.S. Army
Carin Fujisaki	California Court of Appeal, 1st District (2018– )	California	active	
Hiroshi Fujisaki	Los Angeles Municipal Court (1977–1982); Los Angeles County Superior Court (1982–1997)	California	retired	
Fred Fujioka	Los Angeles County Superior Court (2002–2022)	California	retired	
Margaret Fujioka	Alameda County Superior Court (2017– )	California	active	
Alexa D.M. Fujise	Hawaii Intermediate Court of Appeals (2004– )	Hawaii	active	
Morio L. Fukuto	South Bay Municipal Court (1974–1979); Los Angeles Superior Court (1979–1987); California Court of Appeal, 2nd District (1987–1999)	California	deceased	
Una S. Gandbhir	Anchorage Superior Court (2018– )	Alaska	active	
Leah Gasendo	State of California Unemployment Insurance Appeals Board (2012– )	California	active	
Delbert Gee	Alameda County Superior Court (2002–2022)	California	retired	
Dolly Gee	United States District Court for the Central District of California (2010– )	California	active	First Chinese American Female U.S. District Court judge
Herbert W. Gee	Houston Municipal Court (2000–2011)	Texas	deceased	
Lisa M. Ginoza	Hawaii Intermediate Court of Appeals (2010–2024); Supreme Court of Hawaii (2024– )	Hawaii	active	
Marilyn D. Go	United States District Court for the Eastern District of New York (1993–2016)	New York	retired	
Johnny Cepeda Gogo	Santa Clara County Superior Court (2019– )	California	active	
Karen Gopee	Criminal Court of the City of New York (2015– )	New York City	active	
Paul Grewal	United States District Court for the Northern District of California (2010–2016)	California	retired	
Helena Gweon	Superior Court of Sacramento County (2006– )	California	active	
Howard Halm	Los Angeles County Superior Court (2009–2018)	California	retired	
Catherine Hyo-Kyung Ham	Boston Municipal Court (2019–2021); Massachusetts Superior Court (2021– )	Massachusetts	active	
Sunil Harjani	United States District Court for the Northern District of Illinois (2019– )	Illinois	active	
Roy Hashimoto	Alameda County Superior Court (1996–2018)	California	retired	
Douglas Hatchimonji	Orange County Superior Court (2003– )	California	active	
Dennis Hayashi	Alameda County Superior Court (2006– )	California	active	
Sanju Oommen Green	Cook County Circuit Court (2018–)	Illinois	active	
Roberta Hayashi	Superior Court of Santa Clara County (2014– )	California	active	
Yoshimi Hayashi	Hawaii District Court (1972–1974); Hawaii Circuit Court (1974–1980); Hawaii Court of Appeals (1980–1982); Supreme Court of Hawaii (1982–1992)	Hawaii	deceased	
Walter Heen	United States District Court for the District of Hawaii (1981); Hawaii Intermediate Court of Appeals (1982–1994)	Hawaii	retired	
William Haʻehaʻe Heen	Hawaii state circuit court (1917–1919)	Hawaii	deceased	First Asian American (Chinese) judge in the United States
Robert Higa	Los Angeles Municipal Court (1978–1980); Los Angeles County Superior Court (1980–2018)	California	retired	
Kelly Higashi	Superior Court of the District of Columbia (2018– )	Washington, D.C.	active	
Jacquelyn High-Edward	Spokane County Superior Court (Commissioner 2018–2022; Judge 2022– )	Washington	active	
Stuart Hing	Alameda County Superior Court (2008– )	California	active	
Joni Hiramoto	Contra Costa Municipal Court (1998); Superior Court of Contra Costa County (1998– )	California	active	
Keith K. Hiraoka	Hawaii Intermediate Court of Appeals (2018– )	Hawaii	active	
Ernest Hiroshige	Los Angeles Municipal Court (1980–1982); Los Angeles County Superior Court (1982– )	California	active	
Dale Ho	United States District Court for the Southern District of New York (2023– )	New York	active	
James C. Ho	United States Court of Appeals for the Fifth Circuit (2018– )	Texas	active	
Rose Hom	Superior Court of Los Angeles County (1994–2013)	California	retired	
Russell Hom	Sacramento County Superior Court (2002–2022)	California	retired	
Sandy Hom	Immigration Judge, U.S. Department of Justice (1993–2018)	New York	retired	
Jeannie J. Hong	Maryland District Court, District 1 (Baltimore) (2011– )	Maryland	active	
Wesley Hsu	Los Angeles County Superior Court (2017–2023); United States District Court for the Central District of California (2023– )	California	active	
Mark Huang	State of California Workers' Compensation Appeals Board	California	active	
Robert S. Huie	United States District Court for the Southern District of California (2022– )	California	active	
Anne Hwang	Los Angeles County Superior Court (2019–2024); United States District Court for the Central District of California (2024– )	California	active	
Victor Hwang	San Francisco County Superior Court (2016–)	California	active	
Audra Ibarra	Santa Clara County Superior Court (2018– )	California	active	
Garry Ichikawa	Solano County Superior Court (2000–2017)	California	retired	
Paul Igasaki	Administrative Review Board at the U.S. Department of Labor (2010–2018)	Virginia	retired	
Efren Iglesia	Monterey County Superior Court (2007–2021)	California	retired	
Dale Ikeda	Fresno County Superior Court (2000–2018)	California	retired	
John Ing	Los Angeles County Superior Court (2007– )	California	active	
Anthony W. Ishii	United States District Court for the Eastern District of California (1997– )	California	active	
Lance Ito	Los Angeles County Superior Court (1987–2015)	California	retired	Known for presiding over the O. J. Simpson criminal trial
Patricia Ito	Los Angeles County Superior Court (Commissioner: retired c. 2016)	California	retired	
Roger Ito	Los Angeles County Superior Court (Commissioner: 2002– )	California	active	
Don W. Joe	U.S. HHS Office of Medicare Hearings & Appeals	Florida	active	
Myong J. Joun	Boston Municipal Court (2014–2023); United States District Court for the District of Massachusetts (2023– )	Massachusetts	active	
Edward Y. Kakita	Los Angeles County Superior Court (1980–2000)	California	deceased	
Upinder Kalra	Los Angeles County Superior Court (2010– )	California	active	
Tim Kam	Solano County Superior Court (2010– )	California	active	
Masako Kanazawa	Washington Court of Appeals (Commissioner: 2013– )	Washington	active	
Wayne Kanemoto	Santa Clara County Municipal Court (1962–1982)	California	deceased	
Robert Kawahara	Los Angeles County Superior Court (Commissioner: 2002– )	California	active	
Gale Kaneshiro	San Diego Municipal Court (1989–1998); San Diego County Superior Court (1998–2020)	California	retired	
Shiro Kashiwa	U.S. Court of Claims (1972–1982); United States Court of Appeals for the Federal Circuit (1982–1986)	Washington, D.C.	deceased	First Japanese American federal judge
Eileen A. Kato	King County District Court (1994–2016)	Washington	retired	
Kenly Kiya Kato	United States District Court for the Central District of California (2014– )	California	active	
Kenneth H. Kato	Washington Court of Appeals, Division 3 (1997–2007)	Washington	retired	
Warren Masami Kato	Los Angeles County Superior Court (2021– )	California	active	
Ken W. Kawaichi	Oakland-Piedmont-Emeryville Municipal Court, 1975–1980; Alameda County Superior Court (1980–2003)	California	retired	
Lynne Kawamoto	Cook County Circuit Court, Probate (1991–2013)	Illinois	retired	
Ben Kayashima	San Bernardino County Superior Court (1980–2012)	California	retired	
Nadia Keilani	San Diego County Superior Court (Commissioner: 2019– )	California	active	
Angel Kelley	Brockton District Court (2009–2013); Massachusetts Superior Court (2013–2021); United States District Court for the District of Massachusetts (2021– )	Massachusetts	active	
Joyce L. Kennard	Los Angeles Municipal Court (1986–1987); Los Angeles Superior Court (1987–1988); California Second District Court of Appeal (1988–1989); California Supreme Court (1989–2014)	California	deceased	
Abraham Aponte Khan	Los Angeles Municipal Court (1988–2000); Los Angeles County Superior Court (2000–2020)	California	retired	
Edward S. Kiel	United States District Court for the District of New Jersey (2019– )	New Jersey	active	
Andrew C. Kim	Los Angeles County Superior Court (2016– )	California	active	
Brian G. Kim	Maryland District Court, District 6 (2002–2011)	Maryland	resigned	
Chong Kim	Doraville Municipal Court (2020– )	Georgia	active	
Dorothy Kim	California Courts of Appeal (2018– )	California	active	
Esther Kim	Los Angeles County Superior Court (2019– )	California	active	
Frank S. Kim	San Joaquin Municipal Court (1971–1979); Superior Court of San Joaquin County (1979–1991)	California	retired	
Janet Kim	Office of Administrative Hearings	Washington	active	
Mark C. Kim	Los Angeles Municipal Court (1998–2000); Los Angeles County Superior Court (2000– )	California	active	
Sarah G. Kim	Massachusetts Superior Court (2024– )	Massachusetts	active	
Steve Kim	United States District Court for the Central District of California (2016– )	California	active	
Young Kim	Equal Employment Opportunity Commission (2001–2010); United States District Court for the Northern District of Illinois (2010– )	Illinois	active	
George H. King	United States District Court for the Central District of California (1987–2016)	California	retired	
John Kirihara	Merced County Superior Court (2001– )	California	active	
Evan Kitahara	Los Angeles County Superior Court (Commissioner: 2019–)	California	active	
Bert T. Kobayashi	Supreme Court of Hawaii (1969–1978)	Hawaii	deceased	
Charles Kobayashi	Sacramento County Superior Court (1991–2006)	California	retired	
Leslie E. Kobayashi	United States District Court for the District of Hawaii (2010– )	Hawaii	active	
Lucy Koh	Superior Court of Santa Clara County (2008–2010); United States District Court for the Northern District of California (2010–2021); United States Court of Appeals for the Ninth Circuit (2021– )	California	active	
Kimi Kondo	Seattle Municipal Court (1986–2019)	Washington	retired	
Sunil Kulkarni	Superior Court of Santa Clara County (2013– )	California	active	
Sanjay T. Kumar	Los Angeles County Superior Court (2005– )	California	active	
Shalina D. Kumar	United States District Court for the Eastern District of Michigan (2021– )	Michigan	active	
Peggy Kuo	United States District Court for the Eastern District of New York (2015– )	New York	active	
M. Sue Kurita	El Paso County Court at Law, No. 6 (1998– )	Texas	active	
Michael W. Kwan	Taylorsville Municipal Justice Court (1998–2020)	Utah	deceased	
Robert N. Kwan	U.S. Bankruptcy Court (2007–)	California	active	
Ruth Ann Kwan	Los Angeles Municipal Court (1995–1998); Los Angeles County Superior Court (1998– )	California	active	
Owen Lee Kwong	Los Angeles Municipal Court (1989–1993); Los Angeles County Superior Court (1993–2015)	California	retired	
Jonathon Lack	King County Superior Court (2019– )	Washington	active	
Bernie La Forteza	Los Angeles County Superior Court (2008– )	California	active	
Lydia C. Lai	New York City Civil Court, Housing Part (2003– )	New York	active	
Gene Lam	State of California Workers' Compensation Appeals Board	California	active	
Newton Lam	San Francisco County Superior Court (2001–2022)	California	active	
John Lansden	New York City Civil Court, Housing Part (2003– )	New York	active	
Laurie L. Lau	New York City Civil Court, Housing Part (1993–2017)	New York	retired	
Alfred Laureta	District Court for the Northern Mariana Islands (1978–1988)	Northern Mariana Islands	deceased	
Charles J. Lee	Fresno County Superior Court (2022– )	California	active	First Korean-American judge in Fresno County
Christopher P. Lee	Administrative Law Judge, Social Security (1994–2006)	New York	retired	
Cynthia Lee	San Francisco Municipal Court (1998); San Francisco County Superior Court (1998– )	California	active	
Elizabeth Lee	San Mateo County Superior Court (2005– )	California	active	
Eumi K. Lee	Alameda County Superior Court (2019–2024); United States District Court for the Northern District of California (2024– )	California	active	
Irene Lee	Los Angeles County Superior Court (2026– )	California	active	
Jayne Chong-Soon Lee	San Joaquin County Superior Court (Judge: 2019– )	California	active	
John Z. Lee	United States District Court for the Northern District of Illinois (2012–2022); United States Court of Appeals for the Seventh Circuit (2022– )	Illinois	active	
Kenneth Lee	Arizona Superior Court, Pima County (1997– )	Arizona	active	
Kenneth K. Lee	United States Court of Appeals for the Ninth Circuit (2019– )	California	active	
Jo-Lynne Q. Lee	Alameda County Superior Court (2002– )	California	active	
Linda CJ Lee	Washington Court of Appeals (2013– )	Washington	active	
Lorraine Lee	Office of Administrative Hearings (2009– )	Washington	active	
Nelson K.H. Lee	King County Superior Court (2020– )	Washington	active	
Richard Lee	Orange County Superior Court (2010– )	California	active	
Susan Lee	State of California Unemployment Insurance Appeals Board	California	active	
Tony N. Leung	Fourth Judicial District of Minnesota (1994–2011); United States District Court for the District of Minnesota (2011– )	Minnesota	active	
Arthur Lew	Los Angeles County Superior Court (1994–2014)	California	deceased	
Jonathan Lew	State of California Office of Administrative Hearings	California	active	
Ronald S.W. Lew	Los Angeles Municipal Court (1982–1984); Los Angeles Superior Court (1984–1987); United States District Court for the Central District of California (1987–2023)	California	deceased	
Wendy C. Li	New York Civil Court (2019– )	New York	active	
Cynthia Lie	Superior Court of Santa Clara County (2014– )	California	active	
Arnold Lim	New York City Family Court (2000–2019)	New York	Term ended	
John S.W. Lim	Hawaii Intermediate Court of Appeals (1999–2007)	Hawaii	deceased	
Lillian Lim	San Diego County Superior Court (1986–2007)	California	retired	
Rosa Lim	State of California Workers' Compensation Appeals Board	California	active	
Karen Lin	New York City Civil Court, Housing Part (appt. 2006) Queens County (2006-2007), New York City Civil Court (elected 2022), first East Asian woman elected in Queens County, New York State Supreme Court (elected 2023), 2024 to present	New York	active	
Rita F. Lin	Superior Court of San Francisco County (2018–2023); United States District Court for the Northern District of California (2023– )	California	active	
Tana Lin	United States District Court for the Western District of Washington (2021– )	Washington	active	
Doris Ling-Cohan	New York City Civil Court (1995–2002)New York Supreme Court, New York County (2003–2020) Appellate Term (2014–2020)	New York	retired	
Andrew Liu	Monterey County Superior Court (2014– )	California	active	
Charles Y.J. Liu	New York City Civil Court, Housing Part (2017–2018)	New York	deceased	
Goodwin Liu	California Supreme Court (2011– )	California	active	
Livia Liu	Dallas County Criminal District Court, No. 7 (2017– )	Texas	active	
Pelayo A. Llamas Jr.	Alameda County Superior Court (Commissioner: 2019–2022; Judge 2022–)	California	active	
Paul Lo	Merced County Superior Court (2013– )	California	active	
Cynthia Loo	Los Angeles Superior Court (2000–2013); Mariposa County Superior Court (Commissioner: 2014–2015); Kern County Superior Court (Commissioner: 2015– )	California	active	
Pahoua Lor	Fresno County Superior Court (2022 – )	California	active	
Jessie Louie	State of California Workers' Compensation Appeals Board	California	retired	
Lenard Louie	San Francisco Municipal Court (1985–1989); San Francisco County Superior Court (1989–2004)	California	deceased	
Harry Low	San Francisco Municipal Court (1967–1974); San Francisco Superior Court (1974–1983); California Court of Appeal, 1st District (1983–1992)	California	retired	
Elaine Lu	Los Angeles County Superior Court (2007–)	California	active	
John T. Lu	Boston Municipal Court (2001–2006); Massachusetts Superior Court (2006– )	Massachusetts	active	
Jackson Lucky IV	Riverside County Superior Court (2008–2021)	California	retired	
Christopher Lui	Los Angeles County Superior Court (2014– )	California	active	
Elwood G. Lui	California Court of Appeal APJ,2nd District (1975–1987; 2015–)	California	active	
Jennifer T. Lum	United States District Court for the Central District of California (2001–2009)	California	resigned	
Jason Luong	Harris County District Court (2019– )	Texas	active	
Linda Lye	Contra Costa County Superior Court (2018–2020)	California	retired	
John K.C. Mah	State of California Workers' Compensation Appeals Board	California	retired	
Kenji Machida	Los Angeles County Superior Court (2001–2018)	California	active	
Jaya K. Madhavan	New York City Civil Court, Housing Part (2004– 2019?)	New York	Term ended	
Mike Madokoro	Los Angeles County Superior Court (2025– )	California	active	
Kazuharu Makino	Orange County Superior Court (1986–2011)	California	retired	
Joaquin V.E. Manibusan Jr.	United States District Court for the District of Guam (2004–2020)	Guam	retired	
Jenny Cheung Marino	Los Angeles County Superior Court (Commissioner: 2020– )	California	active	
Masaji Marumoto	Supreme Court of Hawaii (1956–1973)	Hawaii	deceased	First Japanese American Justice of the Supreme Court of Hawaii
William M. Marutani	Philadelphia Court of Common Pleas, First Judicial District Pennsylvania (1975–1986)	Pennsylvania	deceased	
Fa'amomoi P. Masaniai Jr.	King County District Court (2021– )	Washington	active	
Laura Masunaga	Siskiyou County Superior Court (2005–2019)	California	retired	
Kiyo A. Matsumoto	United States District Court for the Eastern District of New York (2008– )	New York	active	
Pamala Matsumoto	Los Angeles County Superior Court (Juvenile Court Referee; term ended 2012); Administrative Law Judge	California	Term ended	
Chuck Mau	United States Tax Court (1948–1950); United States Court of Appeals for the First Circuit (1950–1951)	Hawaii	deceased	First Asian American (Chinese) Federal Judge
Aimee Maurer	Spokane County District Court	Washington	active	
Jon Mayeda	Los Angeles County Municipal Court (1981–1999); Los Angeles County Superior Court (1999–2007)	California	retired	
Christopher McDonald	Iowa Supreme Court (2019– )	Iowa	active	
Maureen McKee	King County Superior Court (2018– )	Washington	active	
Sabrina McKenna	Hawaii State Supreme Court (2011– )	Hawaii	active	
Carla Wong McMillian	Georgia State Court for Fayette County (2010–2013); Georgia Court of Appeals (2013–2020); Supreme Court of Georgia (2020– )	Georgia	active	
Cheryl Chun Meegan	Superior Court of Sacramento County (1994–2018)	California	retired	
Amit Mehta	United States District Court for the District of Columbia (2014– )	Washington, D.C.	active	
Benjamin Menor	Hawaii Circuit Court (1968–1974); Supreme Court of Hawaii (1974–1983)	Hawaii	deceased	First Filipino American State Supreme Court Justice
Nathan D. Mihara	Santa Clara County Superior Court (1988–1993); California Court of Appeal, 6th District (1993–2020)	California	active	
Elisabeth K. Mineta	Monterey County Superior Court (2010– )	California	active	
Vibhav Mittal	Orange County Superior Court (2021– )	California	active	
Jack Mizuha	Supreme Court of Hawaii (1961–1968 )	Hawaii	deceased	
Susan Oki Mollway	United States District Court for the District of Hawaii (1998– )	Hawaii	active	First Asian American female federal judge
Ronald T.Y. Moon	Hawaii First Circuit Court (1982–1990); Hawaii State Supreme Court (1990–2010)	Hawaii	deceased	
Joanne Motoike	Orange County Superior Court (2013– )	California	active	
Kenneth Moy	DuPage County Circuit Court (1996–2007)	Illinois	retired	
Sarala Nagala	United States District Court for the District of Connecticut (2021– )	Connecticut	active	
John Nalbandian	United States Court of Appeals for the Sixth Circuit (2018– )	Kentucky	active	
Mike K. Nakagawa	Chief Judge, U.S. Bankruptcy Court, District of Nevada (2006– )	Nevada	active	
Robert Nakagawa	State of California Workers' Compensation Appeals Board	California	active	
Vernon K. Nakahara	Alameda County Municipal Court (1989–1995); Alameda County Superior Court (1995–2018)	California	retired	
Lynn Nakamoto	Oregon Court of Appeals (2011–2016); Supreme Court of Oregon (2015–2021)	Oregon	retired	
Craig H. Nakamura	Hawaii Intermediate Court of Appeals (2004–2018)	Hawaii	retired	
Kirk Nakamura	Orange County Superior Court (2001–2021)	California	active	
Eric Nakata	San Bernardino Municipal Court (1995–1998); San Bernardino County Superior Court (1998–2022)	California	deceased	
Paula A. Nakayama	Supreme Court of Hawaii (1993–2023)	Hawaii	retired	
Arthur Nakazato	United States District Court for the Central District of California (1996–2016)	California	retired	
Marcus Naylor	King County District Court (2019– )	Washington	active	
Jacqueline Nguyen	Superior Court of Los Angeles (2002–2009); United States District Court for the Central District of California (2009–2012); United States Court of Appeals for the Ninth Circuit (2012– )	California	active	
Nho Trong Nguyen	Orange County Superior Court (2000–2013)	California	retired	
Phu Nguyen	Los Angeles County Superior Court (2025– )	California	active	
Daniel Nishigaya	Superior Court of Santa Clara County (2010– )	California	active	
Cary Nishimoto	Los Angeles County Superior Court (1987– )	California	active	
Ricardo Ocampo	Los Angeles County Superior Court (2008– )	California	active	
John Oda	Alameda County Municipal Court (1987–1989); Workers Compensation Appeals Board (Commissioner: 1989–1995)	California	retired	
Jinsook Ohta	San Diego County Superior Court (2020–2021); United States District Court for the Southern District of California (2021– )	California	active	
Sam Ohta	Los Angeles Municipal Court (1998–2000); Los Angeles County Superior Court (2000– )	California	active	
Jeffrey K. Oing	New York Supreme Court (2017– )	New York	active	
Patrick Oishi	King County Superior Court (2011– )	Washington	active	
Melvin Okamoto	Denver County Court (1999–2008)	Colorado	retired	
Vincent Okamoto	Los Angeles County Superior Court (2002–2020)	California	deceased	
Dan Oki	Citrus Municipal Court (1992–1997); Los Angeles County Superior Court (1997–2019)	California	retired	
Tomekichi "Tom" Okino	Puna district Magistrate (1934–)	Hawaii	deceased	First Japanese American Judge
Roxanne Song Ong	Phoenix Municipal Court (1991–2014)	Arizona	retired	
Tomson T. Ong	Long Beach Municipal Court (1997–2000); Los Angeles County Superior Court (2000–2024)	California	retired	
Rafael Ongkeko	Los Angeles County Superior Court (2002–2023)	California	retired	
Sandra Otaka	Cook County Circuit Court, Child Protection (2002–2009)	Illinois	deceased	
Jill Otake	United States District Court for the District of Hawaii (2018– )	Hawaii	active	
Martha M. Pacold	United States District Court for the Northern District of Illinois (2019– )	Illinois	active	
Kyu Young (Mike) Paek	Southern District of New York, Bankruptcy Court (2024 – )	New York	active	
Harkjoon Paik	Monterey County Superior Court (1975–1997)	California	deceased	
Florence Y. Pan	Superior Court of the District of Columbia (2009–2021); United States District Court for the District of Columbia (2021–2022); United States Court of Appeals for the District of Columbia Circuit (2022– )	Washington, D.C.	active	
Ushir Pandit-Durant	New York Supreme Court 11th Judicial District (2019– )	New York (state)	active	
Ann H. Park	Los Angeles County Superior Court (2014– )	California	active	
Michael H. Park	United States Court of Appeals for the Second Circuit (2019– )	New York	active	
Mihae Park	Gwinnett County Recorders Court (2021 – )	Georgia	active	
David Pendleton	Administrative Law Judge, Labor and Industrial Relations Appeals Board (2006–2016)	Hawaii	term ended	
Mia Roberts Perez	Philadelphia County Court of Common Pleas (2016–2022); United States District Court for the Eastern District of Pennsylvania (2022– )	Pennsylvania	active	
Cheri Pham	Orange County Superior Court (2010– )	California	active	
Tu M. Pham	United States District Court for the Western District of Tennessee (2003– )	Tennessee	active	
George F. Phelan	Norfolk and Nantucket Probate & Family Courts (2009–2020)	Massachusetts	retired	
Vedica Puri	San Francisco Superior Court (2019– )	California	active	
Tue Phan-Quang	Executive Office for Immigration Review (1995–2012)	California	retired	
Dorothy Chou Proudfoot	City and County of San Francisco Rent Board (2018– )	California	active	
Rupa Ranga Puttagunta	Superior Court of the District of Columbia (2022–2024)	Washington, D.C.	resigned	
Ronald Quidachay	San Francisco Municipal Court (1983–1998); San Francisco County Superior Court (1998–2018)	California	retired	
Raja Rajeswari	Criminal Court of the City of New York (2015– )	New York	active	
E. Rania Rampersad	King County District Court (2021–2023) King County Superior Court (2023– )	Washington	active	
Nicholas Ranjan	United States District Court for the Western District of Pennsylvania (2019– )	Pennsylvania	active	
Archana Rao	Criminal Court of the City of New York (2020– )	New York City	active	
Neomi Rao	United States Court of Appeals for the District of Columbia Circuit (2019– )	Washington, D.C.	active	
Julian C. Recana	Los Angeles County Superior Court (2015– )	California	active	
Mel Recana	Los Angeles County Superior Court (1981– )	California	active	
Sheila Recio	Orange County Superior Court (2018– )	California	active	
Benjamin Reyes	Superior Court of Contra Costa County (2017– )	California	active	
Brenda T. Rhoades	U.S. Bankruptcy Court for the Eastern District of Texas (2003– )	Texas	active	
Whitney Rivera	Edmonds Municipal Court	Washington	active	
Jerome Roaché	Seattle Municipal Court	Washington	active	
Aruna P. Rodrigo	San Bernardino County Superior Court (Commissioner: 2020–2021; Judge: 2021– )	California	active	
Regina M. Rodriguez	United States District Court for the District of Colorado (2021– )	Colorado	active	
Rebecca Rossow	Ramsey County Juvenile and Family Court Division (Referee: 2011– )	Minnesota	active	
Donna Ryu	United States District Court for the Northern District of California (2010– )	California	active	
Tammy C. Ryu	Los Angeles County Superior Court (2002– )	California	active	
Dana Sabraw	San Diego Municipal Court (1995–1998); San Diego County Superior Court (1998–2003); United States District Court for the Southern District of California (2003– )	California	active	
Mamoru Sakuma	Sacramento County Municipal Court (1963–1964); Sacramento County Superior Court (1964–1985)	California	deceased	
Stephanie C. Santoro	Los Angeles County Superior Court (2023– )	California	active	
Cesar Sarmiento	Los Angeles County Superior Court (1993–2014)	California	active	
Bentrish Satarzadeh	Alameda County Superior Court (Commissioner: 2019– )	California	active	
Stephanie Sato	Alameda County Superior Court (2021– )	California	active	
Dalip Singh Saund	Westmoreland Judicial District (1952–1957)	California	deceased	First Asian American (Indian) elected Justice of the Peace
Lorna G. Schofield	United States District Court for the Southern District of New York (2012– )	New York	active	
Karen Gren Scholer	Texas District Court, 95th Judicial District (2001–2008); United States District Court for the Northern District of Texas (2018– )	Texas	active	
Ramona See	Los Angeles County Superior Court (1997–2021)	California	active	
Susan Ser	Los Angeles County Superior Court (2021– )	California	active	
Deborah Chuang Servino	Orange County Superior Court (2009– )	California	active	
Damon Shadid	Seattle Municipal Court	Washington	active	
Ketu Shah	King County District Court (2013–2019) King County Superior Court (2019– )	Washington	active	
Manish S. Shah	United States District Court for the Northern District of Illinois (2014– )	Illinois	active	
Phyllis Shibata	Los Angeles County Superior Court (Commissioner: 2001–2023)	California	active	
Sookyoung Shin	Massachusetts Appeals Court (2016– )	Massachusetts	active	
William Shin	Los Angeles County Superior Court (2025– )	California	active	
Nhan-Ai Simms	Gwinnett County Juvenile Court (2020– )	Georgia	active	
Lillian Sing	San Francisco County Superior Court (1983–2015)	California	retired	
Mark Singerton	Riverside County Superior Court (2021– )	California	active	
Anil C. Singh	New York City Civil Court (2012); New York Supreme Court, Appellate Division, First Department (2017– )	New York	active	
Rukhsanah Singh	United States District Court for the District of New Jersey (2022– )	New Jersey	active	
Sabita Singh	Concord District Court (2006–2017); Massachusetts Appeals Court (2018– )	Massachusetts	active	
Anuraag Singhal	United States District Court for the Southern District of Florida (2019– )	Florida	active	
Eleanor C. Sinnott	Boston Municipal Court (2006– )	Massachusetts	active	
Taiyyeba Safri Skomra	Immigration Judge, U. S. Department of Justice (2022– )	California	active	
Kawika Smith	San Bernardino County Superior Court (2021– )	California	active	
Micah W. J. Smith	United States District Court for the District of Hawaii (2024– )	Hawaii	active	
Kenneth So	San Diego Municipal Court (1994–1998); San Diego County Superior Court (1998–2023)	California	active	
Janene Sohng	Board of Industrial Insurance Appeals	Washington	active	
Diana Song Quiroga	United States District Court for the Southern District of Texas (2012– )	Texas	active	
Philip Soto	Los Angeles County Superior Court (1998– )	California	active	
Sri Srinivasan	United States Court of Appeals for the District of Columbia Circuit (2013– )	Washington, D.C.	active	First South Asian American U.S. Court of Appeals Judge, Shortlisted for SCOTUS
Nicole J. Starr	Minnesota Second Judicial District (2015– )	Minnesota	active	
Arun Subramanian	United States District Court for the Southern District of New York (2023– )	New York	active	
Randolph M. Subryan	New Jersey Superior Court, Passaic County	New Jersey	retired	
Richard Sueyoshi	Superior Court of Sacramento County (2009– )	California	active	
John H. Sugiyama	Superior Court of Contra Costa County (2002–2020)	California	retired	
Linda Sun	Los Angeles County Superior Court (2020– )	California	active	
Jennifer Sung	United States Court of Appeals for the Ninth Circuit (2021– )	California	active	
Thomas Surh	Alameda County Superior Court (Commissioner: 2002– )	California	retired	
Steven Suzukawa	Los Angeles Municipal Court (1989–1992); Los Angeles Superior Court (1993–2006); California Court of Appeal, 2nd District (2006–2014)	California	retired	
Paul Suzuki	Los Angeles County Superior Court (2010–2022)	California	retired	
Leah Taguba	King County District Court (2021– )	Washington	active	
Sanjay Tailor	Cook County Circuit Court (2003–2022) Illinois First District Appellate Court (2022– )	Illinois	active	
Irene Takahashi	Contra Costa County Municipal Court (1988–1990)	California	retired	
Takasugi Takai	Santa Clara County Superior Court	California	retired	
Drew Takaichi	Santa Clara County Superior Court (2010– )	California	active	
Jon Takasugi	Los Angeles County Superior Court (2008– )	California	active	
Robert Mitsuhiro Takasugi	Los Angeles Municipal Court (1973–1975); Los Angeles Superior Court (1975–1976); United States District Court for the Central District of California (1976–2009)	California	deceased	
Patricia Medina Talbert	New Jersey Superior Court, Essex County (2000–2007)	New Jersey	Term Ended	
Indira Talwani	United States District Court for the District of Massachusetts (2014– )	Massachusetts	active	
Gloria Tan	Massachusetts Juvenile Court (2013–2024); Massachusetts Appeals Court (2024– )	Massachusetts	active	
Sen K. Tan	Anchorage Superior Court (1997–2004)	Alaska	retired	
Victor Tan	California Unemployment Insurance Appeals Board	California	retired	
Gary Tanaka	Los Angeles County Superior Court (2009– )	California	active	
Julie Tang	San Francisco Municipal Court (1991–1997); San Francisco County Superior Court (1998–2015)	California	retired	
Paul E. Tang	Arizona Superior Court, Pima County (2001–2021)	Arizona	retired	
Thomas Tang	United States Court of Appeals for the Ninth Circuit (1977–1995)	Arizona	deceased	First Chinese American federal judge in the continental U.S.
Elizabeth J. Yalin Tao	New York City Civil Court, Housing Part (1994– )	New York	active	
A. Wallace Tashima	U.S, District Court for the Central District of California (1980–1996); United States Court of Appeals for the Ninth Circuit (1996– )	California	active	First Japanese American U.S. Court of Appeals judge
Amul Thapar	United States District Court for the Eastern District of Kentucky (2008–2017); United States Court of Appeals for the Sixth Circuit (2017– )	Kentucky	active	
Indu Thomas	Thurston County Superior Court (Commissioner 2017–2021; Judge 2021– )	Washington	active	
Kathryn Doi Todd	Los Angeles Municipal Court (1978–1981); Los Angeles Superior Court (1981–2000); California Court of Appeal, 2nd District (2000–2013)	California	retired	First Asian American female judge in the U.S.
Peter Tom	New York Supreme Court, Appellate Division, First Department (1994–2019)	New York	retired	
Michelle Tong	San Francisco County Superior Court (2020– )	California	active	
Susan Jung Townsend	Los Angeles County Superior Court (2017– )	California	active	
Leonard N. Trinh	San Diego County Superior Court (2022– )	California	active	
Ricky Tripp	Tulare County Superior Court (2020– )	California	active	
Terry Truong	Los Angeles County Superior Court (Commissioner: 2014– )	California	active	
Richard Tsai	New York City Civil Court Judge (2017– )	New York	active	
Stella Tsai	Philadelphia Court of Common Pleas (2017–2025); Commonwealth Court of Pennsylvania (2026– )	Pennsylvania	active	
Alex G. Tse	United States District Court for the Northern District of California (2019– )	California	active	
Brian Tsuchida	United States District Court for the Western District of Washington (2008– )	Washington	active	
Wilfred Tsukiyama	Supreme Court of Hawaii (1959–1965)	Hawaii	deceased	First Asian American (Japanese) state chief justice (Hawaii)
Mikio Uchiyama	Fresno County Justice Court (1968–1990)	California	deceased	
Raymond Uno	Salt Lake City Court (1976–1978); Utah 5th Circuit Court (1978–1984); Utah 3rd District Court (1984–2002)	Utah	deceased	
Meredith Vacca	Monroe County Court (2021–2024); United States District Court for the Western District of New York (2024– )	New York	active	
Anuradha Vaitheswaran	Iowa Court of Appeals (1999–2023 )	Iowa	retired	
Rena Marie Van Tine	Cook County Circuit Court, Child Protection (2001–2024 ) Illinois First District Appellate Court (pending)	Illinois	active	
Thai Vang	Montgomery District Court (2019 – )	North Carolina	active	
Padma Veeru-Collings	Office of Administrative Hearings (2019 – )	Washington	active	
Jerry Bustos Vinluan III	Santa Cruz County Superior Court (2021– )	California	active	
Nathan T. Vu	Orange County Superior Court (2018– )	California	active	
Sophia Y. Vuelo	Minnesota Second Judicial District (2017– )	Minnesota	active	
Robert S. Wada	Los Angeles County Superior Court (2017– )	California	active	
Richelle M. Wahi	Minnesota First Judicial District (2016– )	Minnesota	active	
James H. Wakatsuki	Hawaii Supreme Court (1983–1992)	Hawaii	deceased	
Kimberly Walden	Tukwila Municipal Court	Washington	active	
Lisa Wang	United States Court of International Trade (2024– )	New York	active	
Nina Y. Wang	United States District Court for the District of Colorado (2015– )	Colorado	active	
Shan C. Wang	Minnesota Seventh Judicial District (2017– )	Minnesota	active	
Neera Lall Walsh	Cook County Circuit Court (2007– )	Illinois	active	
Nancy Waples	Vermont Supreme Court (2022– )	Vermont	active	
Fumiko Hachiya Wasserman	Los Angeles Municipal Court (1987–1993); Los Angeles County Superior Court (1993– )	California	active	
Madge S. Watai	State Bar Court of California (1996–2008)	California	retired	
Corinne Watanabe	Hawaii Intermediate Court of Appeals (1992–2009)	Hawaii	retired	
Michael J. Watanabe	United States District Court for the District of Colorado (1999–2018)	Colorado	retired	
Wilfred Watanabe	Hawaii District Court (1981–2003)	Hawaii	deceased	
Derrick Watson	United States District Court for the District of Hawaii (2013– )	Hawaii	active	
Tommy B. Webb	Kansas Twenty-Sixth Judicial District (1988–2016)	Kansas	retired	First Asian American judge in Kansas
Michael E. Whitaker	Los Angeles County Superior Court (2014– )	California	active	
G. Michael Witte	Wayne Superior Court (Judge Pro Tem: 2009); Dearborn Superior Court (2000–2008); Dearborn County Court (1985–2000)	Indiana	retired	
Alvin T. Wong	State Court of DeKalb County, Division 1 (1998– )	Georgia	active	
Cerena Wong	Sonoma County Superior Court (1997–2010)	California	retired	
Delbert E. Wong	Los Angeles County Superior Court (1961–1982)	California	deceased	First Chinese American Judge in the Continental U.S.
Dick Yin Wong	United States District Court for the District of Hawaii (1975–1978)	Hawaii	deceased	
Garrett L. Wong	San Francisco County Superior Court (2005– )	California	active	
George H. Wu	Los Angeles Municipal Court (1993–1996); Los Angeles County Superior Court (1996–2007); United States District Court for the Central District of California (2007–2023)	California	active	
Margie G. Woods	San Diego Municipal Court (Commissioner: 1993–2001); San Diego County Superior Court (2001–2021)	California	active	
R. Glenn Yabuno	San Bernardino Superior Court (2019– )	California	active	
Glenn H. Yamahiro	Milwaukee County Circuit Court (2003– )	Wisconsin	active	
Adam C. Yang	Minnesota Second Judicial District (2018– )	Minnesota	active	
Bryant Y. Yang	Los Angeles County Superior Court (2020– )	California	active	
Debra Wong Yang	Los Angeles Municipal Court (1997–2000); Los Angeles County Superior Court (2000–2002)	California	retired	
Helen Yang	Los Angeles County Superior Court (2025– )	California	active	
Kristy Yang	Milwaukee County Circuit Court (2018– )	Wisconsin	active	
P. Paul Yang	Minnesota Second Judicial District (2018– )	Minnesota	active	
Scott A. Yang	Los Angeles County Superior Court (2021– )	California	active	
Sue Pai Yang	Essex County Workers' Compensation Court (ret. 2012)	New Jersey	retired	
Paul M. Yee	Quincy District Court (2009–2018)	Massachusetts	retired	
Brian Yep	Los Angeles County Superior Court (2003– )	California	active	
Steven Yep	Santa Clara County Superior Court (Commissioner)	California	unknown (resigned or retired)	
Erica Yew	Santa Clara County Superior Court (2001– )	California	active	
Arthur Yim	Administrative Law Judge (Social Security Administration, Bureau of Hearing and Appeals; 1976–1990)	Michigan	deceased	
Jacob Yim	Los Angeles County Superior Court (2025– )	California	active	
George Yonehiro	Placer County Municipal Court (1967–1985); Placer County Superior Court (1985–1998)	California	deceased	
Jasmine H. Yoon	United States District Court for the Western District of Virginia (2024– )	Virginia	active	
Youlee Yim You	United States District Court for the District of Oregon (2016– )	Oregon	active	
Diane C. Yu	Alameda County Superior Court (Commissioner: c. 1984)	California	retired	
Mary Yu	King County Superior Court (2000–2014); Washington Supreme Court (2014–2025)	Washington	retired	
William Yu	Cook County Circuit Court (2018– )	Illinois	active	
Scott Yun	U.S. Bankruptcy Court for the Central District of California (2014– )	California	active	
Carrie Zepeda-Madrid	Santa Clara County Superior Court (2003– )	California	active	
Jerri J. Zhang	16th Judicial Circuit (2021– )	Missouri	active	

== See also ==
- List of first minority male lawyers and judges in the United States
- List of first women lawyers and judges in the United States
- List of African American jurists
- List of Hispanic and Latino American jurists
- List of Jewish American jurists
- List of LGBT jurists in the United States
- List of Native American jurists

== Sources ==
- Asian American Bar Association of The Greater Bay Area
  - APAs In The Judiciary Resource Page
  - Asian Americans and Pacific Islanders on the Federal Bench
  - Current Asian Pacific American Federal Judges
  - Selected APA Judges in California
- First Vietnamese American and Korean American Women Seated on State Judiciary, by Sam Chu Lin, AsianWeek, August 23, 2002
- Vietnamese American Facts, Tieng Magazine
- Two New APA Judges in Cook County, Illinois, AsianWeek, March 30, 2007
