= Brewbaker =

Brewbaker is a surname. Notable people with the surname include:

- Cary Brewbaker (1915–1982), American football coach
- Dick Brewbaker (born 1961), American politician
- William S. Brewbaker III (born 1959), American legal scholar

== See also ==
- Brewbaker v. Regents, an Iowa Court of Appeals case
- Brewbaker Technology Magnet High School, a high school in Montgomery, Alabama
