= Bazaar Canton =

American commercial establishment

Bazaar Canton was an Asian food and gift store founded by Amy Gee and Stanley Gee in Livermore, California (United States). Bazaar Canton operated from 1971 to 1988 and was the first Asian food and retail store in the Livermore-Amador Valley. It provided an introduction to Asian culture for many residents in the Tri-Valley area.

== History ==
Bazaar Canton was opened by Livermore resident, Amy Gee, a native of Shanghai, China and an accomplished Chinese watercolor artist. Family friends would have Chinese food for dinner at the Gee residence and ask Ms. Gee and her husband, Stanley Gee, a native of Guangzhou, China and a mechanical design draftsman since 1956 at what is now called the Lawrence Livermore National Laboratory, to purchase Chinese groceries from San Francisco and Oakland chinatowns for their own meals.

Eventually, the Gees decided to open a small Chinese grocery store called Bazaar Canton in a small Livermore shopping center at the east end of Second Street known as The Mall. When Bazaar Canton opened on April 1, 1971, Livermore had very few Asian residents and only two small Chinese American restaurants, the Yin Yin and Maly's.

Canton Bazaar was originally considered for the name of the business but rejected because a San Francisco Chinatown store catering to tourists already had the name. An owner of the Way Up Gallery, a neighboring art gallery, suggested reversing the name, and the new business had its name.

=== Teaching at the store ===
The Livermore Symphony Guild asked Ms. Gee if she would teach Chinese cooking as a fundraiser for the Guild. She agreed and the lessons became extremely popular, prompting Ms. Gee to continue to give Chinese cooking lessons at her home. The popularity of her Chinese cooking lessons caused Bazaar Canton to quickly double in size by moving downstairs in The Mall and sell Chinese cookware, dishes, and utensils at the store. Sales continued to grow and Bazaar Canton tripled its space by moving to a street-front location at The Mall and began to feature a wide variety of Asian groceries, cookware, and gift items.

=== Move ===
Bazaar Canton's final move to the JC Penney shopping center in 1973 quadrupled the size of the store, dramatically increasing its selection of Asian gift items of all kinds, shapes, and varieties to the point where the store became more known to local shoppers as a gift store. At that time, the JC Penney's shopping center at Second Street and South L Street was the primary shopping center in Livermore. The store also began selling refrigerated Asian food items. Due to popular demand, the store in later years even began selling fresh Chinese dim sum dumplings and pastries from Oakland Chinatown on Saturday mornings. By 1973, Bazaar Canton became one of the larger retail establishments in Livermore. Bazaar Canton later opened a large branch gift store to service the growing suburban population in San Ramon, California. As the population of Livermore grew, and with it the city's Asian population, Bazaar Canton also served the new refugee Vietnamese American families in the town as a clearinghouse for community charitable donations and making available merchandise for those immigrant families.

After 17 years in business, Ms. Gee had become a well-known business owner in Livermore. In 1988, Mr. and Ms. Gee, Livermore residents since 1964, decided to retire after raising five children and close the store. Their son Delbert Gee is an Alameda County Superior Court judge. Although the population of Livermore, and its Asian population, has increased since 1988, Bazaar Canton is remembered by some long-time Livermore residents as their first introduction to Asian culture.
