= Agbayani =

Agbayani is a Filipino surname. Notable people with the surname include:

- Bayani Agbayani (born 1969), Filipino actor, singer/songwriter of "Otso Otso"
- Benny Agbayani (born 1971), American baseball player
- Tetchie Agbayani (born 1961), Filipina actress
- Tony Agbayani (born 1956), American judge
