= Delbert Gee =

American judge

Judge of the Alameda County Superior Court
- In office 2002–2023
- Appointed by: Gray Davis

Personal details
- Born: 1955 (age 70–71) Oakland, California, United States
- Education: University of California, Davis (BA)

Delbert C. Gee (born 1955) is a retired Alameda County Superior Court Judge who served from 2002 to 2022, presiding over both civil and criminal cases.

He began his legal career in 1980 as a Deputy District Attorney in Ventura County where he tried 33 jury trials to verdict. Gee was a civil litigator for the following 20 years in San Francisco.

Gee was as a member of the Law Review; receiving his undergraduate degree from the University of California Davis and his law degree from Santa Clara University School of Law. Gee was a first generation college student.

== Education ==
Gee was a congressional intern in Washington, D.C. for representative Pete Stark during the Bicentennial summer of 1976, and was co-chair of the campus Media Board at University of California, Davis, where he graduated with a bachelor of arts degree in political science in 1977.

He then attended Santa Clara University School of Law where he was an associate editor of the Santa Clara Law Review. Gee clerked for attorney Donald Ayer in the criminal division of the office of the United States Attorney for the Northern District of California in San Jose, California. Gee graduated from law school in December 1979.

== Legal career ==
Gee became a member of the State Bar of California in May 1980 and began his legal career as a Deputy District Attorney in Ventura County where he tried 33 jury trials to verdict as the county's first Asian-Pacific Islander American prosecutor.

He then spent the next 20 years in San Francisco as a civil litigator, first as an associate attorney with Hassard, Bonnington, Rogers & Huber and then with Bronson, Bronson & McKinnon, and later as a partner with Sturgeon, Keller, Phillips, Gee & O'Leary PC and then as a founding partner of the Pacific West Law Group LLP.

He specialized in the fields of health and liability insurance bad faith litigation, medical malpractice litigation, and health care law.

== Judicial career ==
Gee was appointed to the bench in 2002 by California Governor Gray Davis. Gee served as a judge of the Superior Court of California (US) for the County of Alameda, and presided over both a civil direct calendar and a criminal felony and misdemeanor calendar and trial court.

He also presided over a probate, conservatorship, and guardianship court, collaborative and drug courts, and a juvenile dependency and delinquency court.

He was the last judge to preside over criminal cases in the Alameda courthouse, and he presided over two civil jury trials conducted entirely by video during the COVID-19 pandemic. He was a member of the court's executive committee, and was the supervising judge of the court's probate division and of the Alameda courthouse.

In 2002, he was honored by the Asian American Bar Association of the Greater Bay Area, and was presented in 2010 with the Judicial Distinguished Service Award by the Alameda County Bar Association and a resolution in his honor by the California State Assembly.

== Personal life ==
Gee's parents immigrated to California, where he attended Livermore High School in Alameda County California. Gee was a first generation college student.

He has been active for decades in numerous professional, civic, and service organizations in the San Francisco Bay Area, and continues to be a sustaining member of the Asian American Bar Association of the Greater Bay Area (AABA) where he founded the AABA Judges Scholarship.

== See also ==
- Judiciary of California
- Alameda County Superior Court
- Hayward Hall of Justice
- List of Asian American jurists
- List of University of California, Davis alumni
- Livermore High School
- Bazaar Canton
