= Gail Chang Bohr =

Jamaica-born American judge from Minnesota

Second Judicial District judge for Ramsey County
- In office January 5, 2009 – March 31, 2014
- Preceded by: John T. Finley
- Succeeded by: Thomas A. Gilligan, Jr.

Personal details
- Born: March 25, 1944 (age 82) Kingston, Jamaica
- Spouse: Richard Bohr
- Children: 2
- Education: Wellesley College (BA); Simmons College (MSc); William Mitchell College of Law (JD)
- Profession: Jurist, attorney
- Known for: First Asian American judge in Ramsey County

Gail Chang Bohr (born 1944) is a retired judge from Minnesota. Bohr was elected Second Judicial District judge for Ramsey County, Minnesota in 2008. Bohr served from January 5, 2009 to March 31, 2014, and then served as a senior judge until June 30, 2015. Chang Bohr was executive director of the Children’s Law Center of Minnesota from 1995 to 2008.

== Early life ==
On March 25, 1944, Bohr was born in Kingston, Jamaica. Bohr's parents are Chinese immigrants in Jamaica. Bohr's parents opened and operated the first supermarket in Jamaica. Bohr is the 9th of 15 children.

== Education ==
In 1962, Bohr attended Wellesley College on a full scholarship in the United States. In 1966, Bohr earned her BA degree from Wellesley College. Bohr earned her MSc in social work from the Simmons College School of Social Work. Bohr earned her JD from the William Mitchell College of Law, graduating magna cum laude in 1991.

== Career ==
Bohr was a clinical social worker for 19 years. In 1991, Bohr began her law career as a clerk for Minnesota Supreme Court Justice Sandy Keith. Bohr was then an attorney for the firm of Faegre & Benson in Minneapolis. From 1995 to 2008, she worked as the executive director of the Children's Law Center of Minnesota, training over 250 volunteer lawyers to represent youth in foster care. She has received multiple awards for her work as a child advocate.

Bohr ran for Second Judicial District judge for Ramsey County, Minnesota in 2008. Bohr was endorsed by former Vice President Walter Mondale and six retired justices from the Minnesota Supreme Court. In the race, against former state legislator Howard Orenstein, she received 51.87% of the vote to her opponent's 47.49%.

On January 5, 2009, Bohr became the first Asian American judge to serve Ramsey County, Minnesota. Bohr reached the mandatory retirement age for judges in Minnesota before the end of her term. On March 31, 2014, Bohr retired.

On April 1, 2014, Bohr served as a senior judge for the State of Minnesota until June 30, 2015. Bohr served as an international consultant with the National Center for State Courts Trinidad and Tobago Juvenile Court Project.

== Awards ==
- 2007 Minnesota Lawyer's 2007 Outstanding Service to the Profession Award.
- 2008 Top Ten Legal Newsmaker of the Decade (June 2008).
- 2015 Council on Asian Pacific Minnesotans' Lifetime Achievement Award.
- 2016 Minnesota Council on Martin Luther King, Jr. Holiday Distinguished Service Award (January 18, 2016).
- 2018 Women of Distinction.

== Personal life ==
Bohr's husband is Richard Bohr.

== See also ==
- List of Asian American jurists
