= Sanket J. Bulsara =

American judge (born 1976)

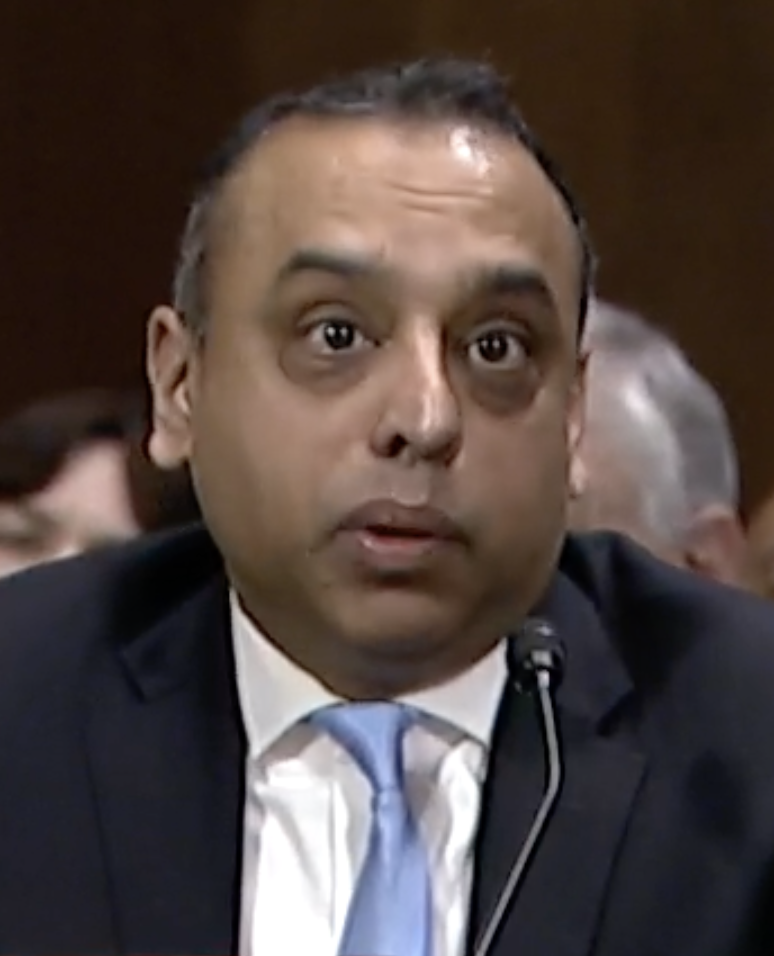

Judge of the United States District Court for the Eastern District of New York
- Incumbent
- Assumed office December 20, 2024
- Appointed by: Joe Biden
- Preceded by: Joan Azrack

Magistrate Judge of the United States District Court for the Eastern District of New York
- In office November 2, 2017 – December 20, 2024

Personal details
- Born: Sanket Jayshukh Bulsara; 1976 (age 49–50) The Bronx, New York, U.S.
- Education: Harvard University (BA, JD)

Sanket Jayshukh Bulsara (born 1976) is an American lawyer who serves as a United States district judge of the United States District Court for the Eastern District of New York. He previously served as a United States magistrate judge of the same court from 2017 to 2024.

== Education ==
Bulsara received a Bachelor of Arts, magna cum laude, from Harvard College in 1998 and a Juris Doctor from Harvard Law School, cum laude, in 2002.

== Career ==
Bulsara served as a law clerk for Judge John G. Koeltl of the United States District Court for the Southern District of New York from 2002 to 2003. From 2003 to 2004, he was an associate at Munger, Tolles & Olson in Los Angeles. For six months between 2007 and 2008 he served as a special assistant district attorney at the Brooklyn District Attorney’s Office. He worked at Wilmer Cutler Pickering Hale and Dorr as an associate from 2005 to 2008, a counsel from 2009 to 2011, and a partner from 2012 to 2015. From 2015 to 2017, he served as the deputy general counsel for appellate litigation, adjudication, and enforcement; serving as the acting general counsel of the United States Securities and Exchange Commission from January 2017 to May 2017.

=== Federal judicial service ===
From 2017 to 2024, Bulsara served as a United States magistrate judge of the Eastern District of New York. He was sworn in on November 2, 2017, by Chief Judge Dora Irizarry.

On February 7, 2024, President Joe Biden announced his intention to nominate Bulsara to serve as a United States district judge of the United States District Court for the Eastern District of New York. On February 8, 2024, his nomination was sent to the Senate. President Biden nominated Bulsara to the seat vacated by Judge Joan Azrack, who subsequently assumed senior status on December 19, 2024. On March 6, 2024, a hearing on his nomination was held before the Senate Judiciary Committee. During his confirmation hearing, he was questioned by Senator Mike Lee about his membership in the National Asian Pacific American Bar Association, which has put out statements supporting sanctuary cities and opposing a ban on transgender athletes playing female school sports. On April 11, 2024, his nomination was favorably reported out of committee by a 12–9 vote. On May 15, 2024, the United States Senate invoked cloture on his nomination by a 52–42 vote. Later that day, his nomination was confirmed by a 51–42 vote. He received his judicial commission on December 20, 2024.

== See also ==
- List of Asian American jurists

Legal offices
Preceded by Joan Azrack	Judge of the United States District Court for the Eastern District of New York; 2024–present	Incumbent
