= Lincoln Law School of Sacramento =

Law school located in California

Coordinates: 38°34′20″N 121°27′51″W

- Established: 1969; 57 years ago
- School type: Private, for-profit
- Dean: Filomena Yeroshek
- Location: Sacramento, California, US
- Enrollment: 250
- Faculty: 1 FT 25 PT
- USNWR ranking: Not ranked
- Bar pass rate: 46%% (17/37) (July 2025 first-time takers)
- Website: www.lincolnlaw.edu

The Lincoln Law School of Sacramento is a private, for-profit law school in Sacramento, California. The school offers an evening-only, four-year juris doctor degree program.

== Accreditation ==
Lincoln Law School received approval from the Committee of Bar Examiners of the State Bar of California in 1978.

The law school is not accredited by the American Bar Association. Lincoln graduates do not immediately qualify to take the bar exam and join the bar of states other than California, and may not qualify in any event in some jurisdictions. If Lincoln graduates are allowed to take the bar examination in other states they must follow the rules of those jurisdictions that may include years in practice, additional education, and other requirements.

== Admissions ==
According to Lincoln Law School's California Information Report for 2017, 73.2% of applicants were accepted with the average enrollee having a 143 LSAT score and 2.94 undergraduate GPA.

== Bar passage rate ==
Of the 37 Lincoln graduates who took the California bar exam for the first time in July 2025, 17 passed, for a 46% passage rate, vs. a 69% overall pass rate.

== Notable alumni ==
- Eugene Balonon (Class of 1984), judge, Sacramento County Superior Court
- Bruce Nestande (deceased), Republican California State Assemblyman and Orange County Supervisor
- Leonard Padilla (Class of 1980), media personality, bail bondsman, and bounty hunter
