= Wendy Duong =

American lawyer

Wendy Nicole Duong, née Dương Như Nguyện (also writing creatively under a pen name as Uyen Nicole Duong), is the first Vietnamese-American to hold judicial office in the United States. In 1992, she was appointed Associate Municipal Judge for the City of Houston and Magistrate for the State of Texas. She was then honored by the American Bar Association in New York City as among “Pioneer Women of Color in the Judiciary.” After serving a three-year term, she resigned to become an international lawyer for Mobil Corporation - Asia-Pacific. In 2001, she joined the faculty of University of Denver, Sturm College of Law, as a corporate law and international business transactions professor. A Fulbright Core Program Legal Scholar to Asia and Fulbright Legal Specialist to Russia, Duong also combined her legal career with novel writing, and was scouted by the publishing division of Amazon, Inc., which published her historical fiction trilogy featuring Vietnam’s decolonization, the fall of Saigon, immigrant life, and women’s themes. The third novel, Mimi and Her Mirror, won the Multicultural Fiction International Book Award in 2012. She currently practices law in Houston and writes full-time.

== Life in exile ==
Born in Hoi An, Vietnam to parents who were language professors, Duong and her family escaped the Communist siege of Saigon on a U.S. cargo plane three days before the collapse of the Republic of (South) Vietnam. Then a 16-year-old about to graduate from high school, she in March 1975 had just won South Vietnam’s Presidential Honor Price in Literature, and was expected to be designated as National Valedictorian by the Ministry of Education for her perfect GPA and national ranking.

== Education and career ==
In America, she continued to excel academically. She attended Southern Illinois University on scholarship, and graduated summa cum laude, majoring in journalism, with a minor in French and Vietnamese comparative literature. She became the first foreign-born news editor for the campus newspaper.

Upon graduation, she worked for a Houston advertising firm (founded by Jack Valenti), and decided to pursue law. She then graduated from the University of Houston Law Center with a J.D, cum laude, receiving the Jurisprudence Award in constitutional law. Duong subsequently earned her LL.M. (with a straight-A transcript and published thesis on gender studies) from Harvard Law School.

During law school at the University of Houston, Duong worked full time as Executive Director of Risk Management for the Houston Independent School District (HISD) and became the first Asian-American woman to serve the HISD in an executive position. She also became the first Vietnam-born lawyer to clerk for the federal court in Texas.

Duong then left Texas to begin her law practice with the prestigious law firm of Wilmer Cutler & Pickering (now WilmerHale) in Washington D.C., during which time she also represented Vietnamese refugees pro bono, with Wilmer’s full support. In 1991, she was selected as regional finalist representing Southwestern states for the White House Fellowship, but withdrew her application due to federal employment restriction. Prior to her judgeship appointment in Houston, Texas, Duong was a special trial attorney for the Securities and Exchange Commission Office of General Counsel in Washington D.C., and was recognized by the agency with outstanding-lawyer performance awards.

Later, as an international lawyer and corporate in-house counsel, she handled the multi-million-dollar “Blue Dragon” oil exploration contract offshore Vietnam for Mobil, and was the first Vietnam-born lawyer to join the multinational corporation’s global Major Transaction Group. In private practice, she headed a team of lawyers examining Y2K liability exposure for all international assets of a Texas-based multinational energy company.

Known in the Vietnamese American community for her multi-faceted career, in her younger days she was a singer/dancer, attended the American Academy for Dramatic Arts, and auditioned for the debut of the musical Miss Saigon in New York City and Los Angeles. A self-taught L’Art Brut visual artist, Duong also wrote and published essays on law and culture, law and art, law and technology, human rights, gender studies, corporate law, and international economic law. Among Vietnamese American literary artists, she is the only one who writes and publishes bilingually (Vietnamese/English, both poetry and novels). She combined artistic pursuits with the full-time practice of law for 4 decades, working in major cities of the U.S., Europe, and Southeast Asia. While serving as a professor of corporate and international economic law at the University of Denver, she used her paintings and essays to advocate against human trafficking, and successfully organized a diversity concert featuring classical, Broadway, and Vietnamese music at Hamilton Hall, Lamont School of Music, the first concert of its kind in Denver.

== Bibliography ==
- The Fragrance of Cinnamon Duong, Nhu Nguyen, Mui Huong Que (Van Nghe, CA 1999)
- Daughters of the River Huong: a Vietnamese royal concubine & her descendants, Duong, Uyen (Ravensyard Publishing, Vienna, VA 2005) ISBN 1-928928-16-1
- Chin Chu Cua Nang (Her Nine Words) (Van Moi, CA 2005)
- Con Gai Cua Song Huong (translator: Linh-Chan Brown, Ravensyard 2005)
- BuuThiepCua Nam (translator: Doan Khoach Thanh Tam, Van Moi, CA 2010)
- Postcards from Nam Duong, Uyen Nicole (semifinalist, Multicultural Fiction International Book Award 2011) (AmazonEncore) ISBN 978-1-612180-18-2
- Mimi and Her Mirror ("The 2012 International Book Awards". Archived from the original on 2013-07-03.) (AmazonEncore/Lake Union) ISBN 978-1-935597-30-8

== Scholarly publications ==
- Bankruptcy Law Comes Into Force in Vietnam, INTERNATIONAL FINANCIAL LAW REVIEW 33 (April 1994).
- Vietnam’s Move to the Market: New Business Bankruptcy Law, 16 EAST ASIAN EXECUTIVE REPORTS No. 4, 7 (Apr. 15, 1994).
- The Long Saga of the Spratly Islands: An Overview of the Territorial Disputes Among Vietnam, China, and Other ASEAN Nations in the South China Sea, 13 TEXAS TRANSNATIONAL LAW QUARTERLY 26 (November 1997).
- The Long Saga of the Spratly Islands “Elongated Sandbanks”: Overview of the Territorial Disputes Among Vietnam, China, and other ASEAN Nations in the South China Sea, CURRENTS [SOUTH TEXAS COLLEGE OF LAW] 47 (Summer 1997).
- Gender Equality and Women’s Issues in Vietnam -- The Vietnamese Woman: Warrior and Poet, 10 PACIFIC RIM LAW & POLICY JOURNAL 191 (2001)
- The Magic of Digital Signatures in the New Age of Global-E-Commerce, 15 TEXAS TRANSNATIONAL LAW QUARTERLY No. 2, 26 (April 2001).
- The Practice of Teaching Law: The Why is More Important Than the How, University of Denver College of Law Alumni Magazine 18 (2003).
- Partnership with Monarchs – Two Case Studies: Case One – Partnerships with Monarchs in the Search for Oil: Unveiling and Re-Examining the Patterns of “Third World” Economic Development in the Petroleum Sector, 25 U. PA. J. INT’L ECON. L. 1171 (2004)
- Law is Law and Art is Art and Shall the Two Ever Meet? Law and Literature: The Comparative Creative Processes, 15 SOUTHERN CALIFORNIA INTERDISCIPLINARY LAW JOURNAL, No. 1, 1 (2005)
- Partnership with Monarchs – Two Case Studies: Case Two – Partnerships with Monarchs in the Development of Energy Resources: Dissecting an Independent Power Project and Re-Evaluating the Role of Multilateral and Project Financing in the International Energy Sector, 26 U. PA. J. INT’L ECON. L. 69 (2005)
- Following the Path of Oil: The Law of the Sea or RealPolitik – What Good Does Law Do in the South China Sea Territorial Conflicts? 30 FORDHAM INTERNATIONAL LAW JOURNAL, No. 4, 1098 (April 2007)
- Ghetto’ing Workers With Hi-Tech: Exploring Regulatory Solutions for the Effect of Artificial Intelligence on “Third World” Foreign Direct Investmen't, 21 TEMPLE INTERNATIONAL & COMPARATIVE LAW JOURNAL, No. 20, 101 (2008)
- Effect of Artificial Intelligence on the Pattern of Foreign Direct Investment in the Third World: A Possible Reversal of Trend, DENVER JOURNAL OF INT’L LAW & POLICY (Summer 2008) (paper based on speech at International Law Symposium).
- The Southeast Asian Story and its Forgotten “Prisoners of Conscience”: Some Proposed Legal Measures to Combat Human Trafficking, 9 Seattle Journal for Social Justice Issue 2. 679 (Spring/Summer 2011
- Revisiting the Build-Operate-Transfer Structure for International Infrastructure Building: A Critique of International Economic Development in Lesser Developed Nations, Duong, Wendy N. In International Business Law in the 21st Century: Challenges and Issues in East Asia, ed. (2012 Cambridge Independent Press).

== See also ==
- List of Asian American jurists
- List of first women lawyers and judges in the United States
