= Leonard Padilla =

American bounty hunter

- Born: 1939 (age 86–87)
- Education: Lincoln Law School of Sacramento
- Occupation: Retired

== Early life ==
Leonard Padilla was born in Fresno, California. After graduating from high school, he enlisted in the Air Force. Padilla graduated from Lincoln Law School of Sacramento in 1980.
