= Brendon Woods =

American lawyer (born 1970)

Brendon D. Woods
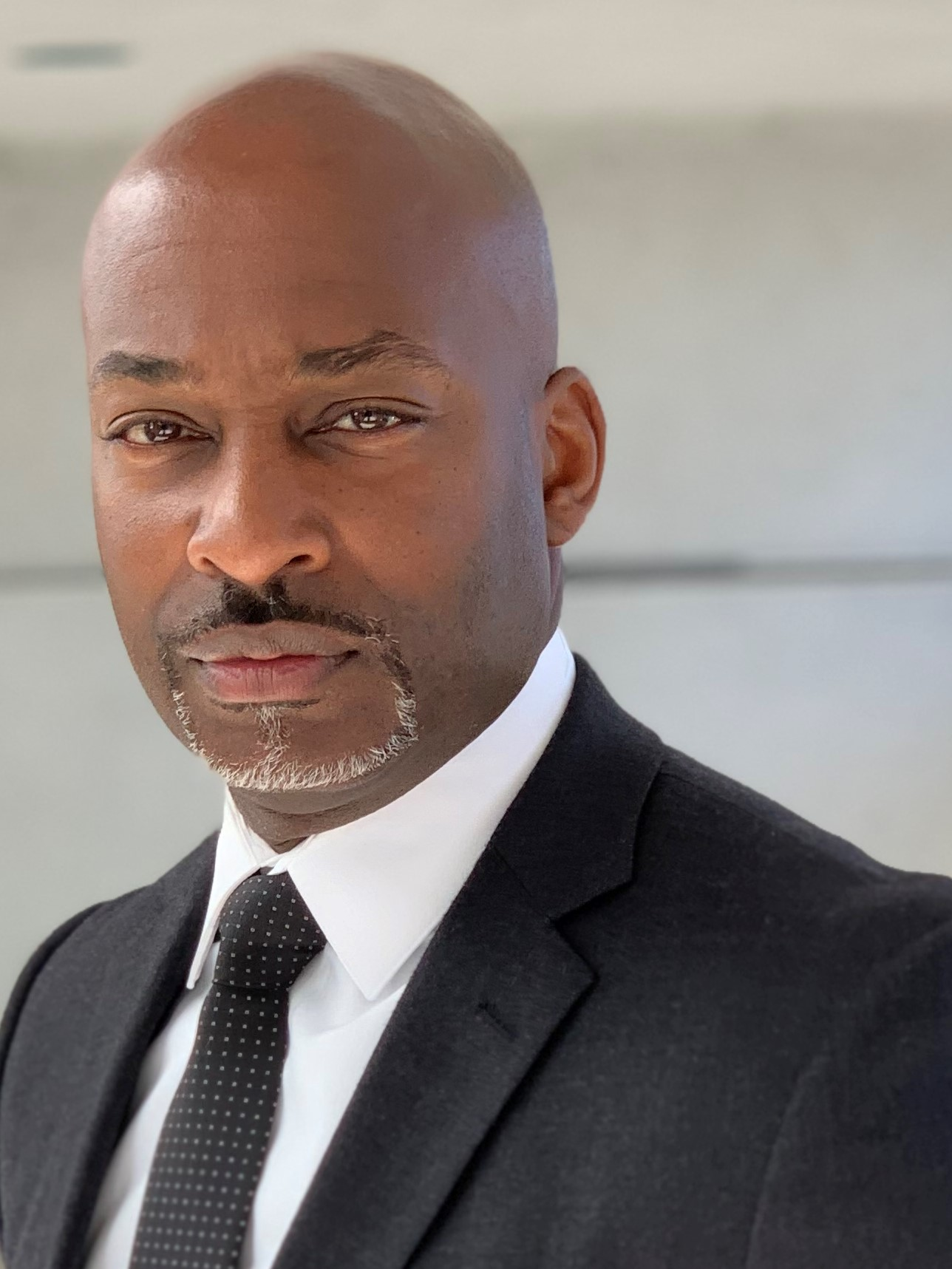

Public Defender of Alameda County, California
- Incumbent
- Assumed office December 2012
- Preceded by: Diane A. Bellas

Personal details
- Born: Brendon DeWayne Woods; October 4, 1970 (age 55)
- Party: Democratic
- Education: University of California, Santa Barbara (B.A.); University of San Francisco (J.D.)

Brendon DeWayne Woods (born October 4, 1970) is an American criminal defense attorney, public defender, and an advocate for criminal justice reform. Woods was appointed Public Defender for Alameda County in December 2012, making him the county's first African American Public Defender.

== Early life ==
Woods was born in Jamaica, Queens. He was raised by his mother and extended family. Woods's mother was in the United States Navy and the family moved several times. Woods attended four different high schools before the family moved to Carmel-by-the-Sea, California. In an interview, Woods recalled being the victim of racial profiling during his youth. He cited several incidents where he was followed and stopped by police for minor infractions. Woods completed undergraduate studies at the University of California, Santa Barbara and graduated from the University of San Francisco School of Law in 1996.

== Legal career ==
He served as a law clerk in 1995 and in 1996 for the California Office of the State Public Defender and the Criminal Division of the San Francisco County Superior Court.

=== Alameda County Public Defender ===
After law school, Woods went to work as a post-bar clerk for the Alameda County Public Defender's Office. He was hired as an Associate Deputy Public Defender two years later. From 1998 until 2012, Woods worked his way to Deputy Public Defender, Assistant Public Defender, Senior Assistant Public Defender, and finally as Chief Public Defender in Alameda County.

In December 2012, Woods was appointed the Public Defender by the Alameda County Board of Supervisors, becoming the county's first African American Public Defender.

In 2023, cultural commentators and legal scholars discussed an amicus curiae brief filed by Woods in United States v. Rahimi, and critiqued its use as better delegated to the legislature.

=== Programs and initiatives ===
Woods established the Clean Slate Program that helps adults on probation seal their criminal record. Woods created the L.Y.R.I.C. (Learn Your Rights in California) program, which sends public defenders to high schools to teach students how to safely assert their constitutional rights with police officers.

In 2014, Woods created an Immigration Representation Unit to represent people during removal proceedings in immigration court, the first unit of its kind in the state of California. In 2018, the unit discovered that the Oakland Police Department had mistakenly rejected U-visa certifications.

In 2016, Woods spearheaded a program that educates people housed in the county jail about their voting rights and registers people to vote.

=== Public-policy positions ===
Woods has advocated for cash bail reform in California. Woods noted that an unfair cash bail system forces many people accused of crimes to take plea deals so that they can keep their jobs and continue to support their families.

Woods advocated to the Board of Supervisors for the elimination of fines and fees for criminal defendants in Alameda County, citing the significant financial burden for low-income people . After the presentation, the board eliminated court administrative fees.

In 2016, Woods criticized the new case management system for the Alameda County Superior Court, citing glitches that resulted in false arrests and imprisonments. Woods has been outspoken in his criticism of police officers who engage in misconduct and excessive force.

In 2017, Woods led a coalition that opposed holding all in-custody arrangements at a new courthouse in Dublin, California. He opposed the move because it would result in more time in custody for people accused of a crime and would prevent low-income family members from attending arraignments.

In 2018, Woods criticized proposed changes to jury service rules citing the impact on low-income prospective jurors. Woods criticized the Los Angeles County Board of Supervisors for appointing an interim public defender who lacked criminal law experience. He criticized the Alameda County Sheriff's Office for secretly recording the conversations between juvenile suspects and their attorneys.

=== Social justice activism ===
In 2014, Woods held a Black Lives Matter rally for police accountability. He said: "When you think of driving while black, yes, I've been a victim of that. I've been stopped countless times for no apparent reason. I've had family members who've gone to the criminal justice system."

In 2018, Woods and a group from the Alameda County Public Defender's Office knelt on the steps of the Oakland courthouse to protest racial injustice, police brutality and mass incarceration.

== Awards and recognition ==
In 2013, East Bay Express recognized Woods as the "Most Courageous New Public Official" citing his advocacy for indigent defendants and his engagement with public-policy debates. In 2014, Alameda County Board of Supervisors recognized Woods for receiving the Santa Clara County and Santa Clara County Black Lawyers Association's Gideon Award.
