= Hayward Hall of Justice =

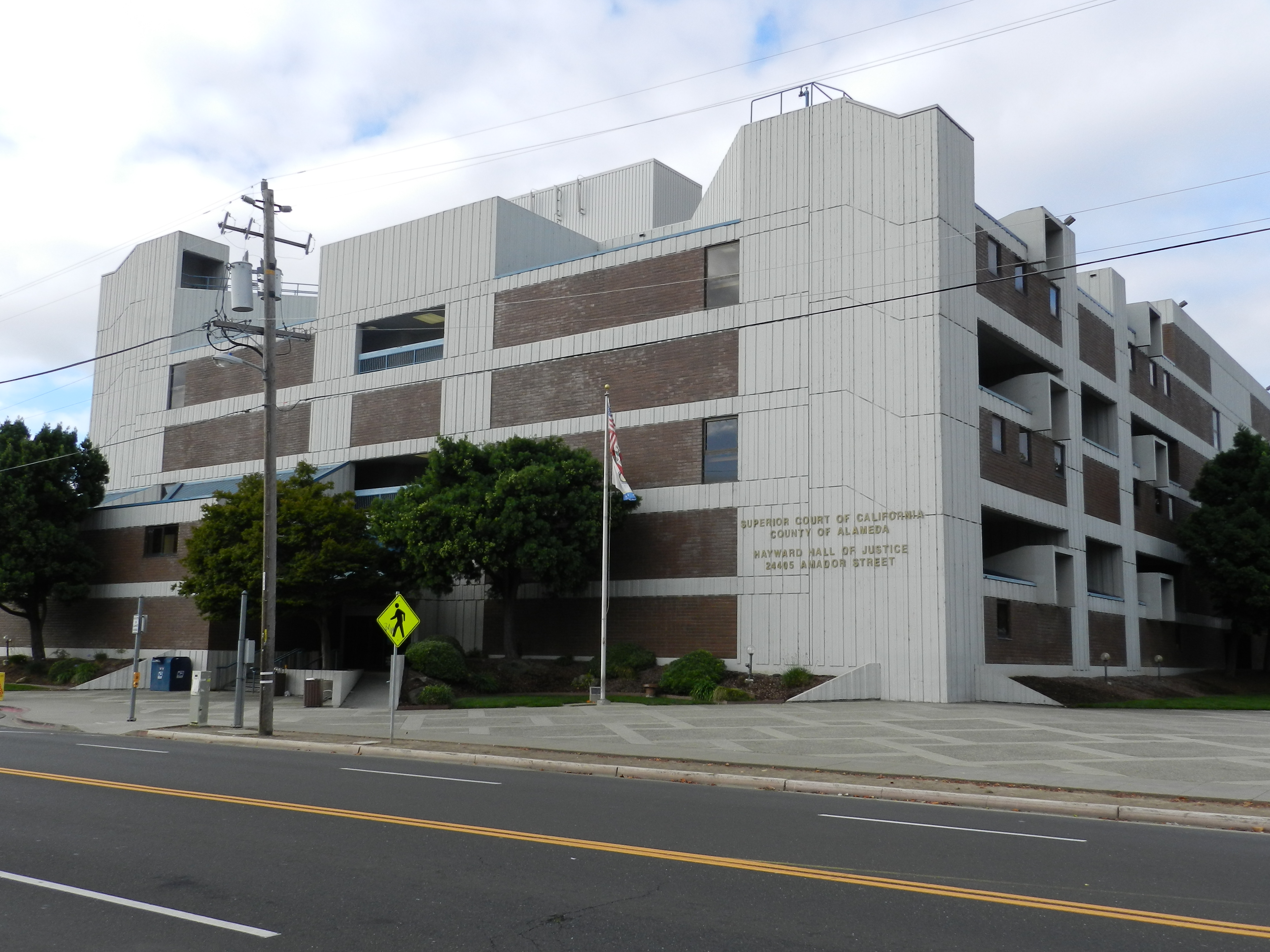
- Interactive map of the Hayward Hall of Justice area

General information
- Type: Government
- Location: 24405 Amador Street; Hayward, California
- Coordinates: 37.65723°N 122.09446°W
- Completed: 1975

The Hayward Hall of Justice is an Alameda County Superior Court building, located in Hayward, California. It is located in a complex of buildings which includes the Hayward Police Department, Hayward Unified School District offices, and the Hayward jail. Across Amador Street is a building which houses various social service offices, including the General Assistance office for Hayward. The courthouse is one of a number of locations for the Alameda County Superior Court system.

It was built in 1975 to house offices for the Superior Court (prior to county court unification), and the former San Leandro/Hayward/Union City Municipal Court. It contains 20 court departments, the Alameda County sheriff and marshal's substation, and District Attorney offices. It is the largest full-service courthouse in Alameda County, hearing criminal, civil, juvenile, family law, and Proposition 36 drug court cases. Hayward traffic cases are now handled at the Fremont Hall of Justice in Fremont. One of the court's departments is located off site at John George Psychiatric Pavilion, for the adjudication of psychiatric holds on patients there.

== Judges ==
Judges serving at the Hayward Hall of Justice include Delbert Gee, and formerly Robert Fairwell. Fairwell was the second oldest seated judge in California at the time of his retirement in 2007, after serving more than 40 years.

== Trials ==
The retrial of Juan Corona took place there, as did the trial of Kenneth Parnell.
