= Eugene Balonon =

American judge

Eugene L. Balonon is an American lawyer who serves as a judge of the Sacramento County Superior Court.

== Early life ==
Eugene L. Balonon was born in San Francisco, California. He graduated from California State University, Sacramento with a Bachelor of Arts in criminal justice. He then graduated from Lincoln Law School with a J.D. in 1984.

== Career ==
After graduating from law school, he interned in a private practice. He was a deputy district attorney from 1985 to 1989, 1995 to 1996, and 1999 to 2004 for the Sacramento County District Attorney's office. Balonon served as Chief Deputy Director of the California State Lottery Commission from 1996 to 1999. He was executive director of the California Gambling Control Commission and worked in the Office of Criminal Justice Planning. He also worked as a legal writing professor at Lincoln Law School.

Balonon was appointed to the bench in Sacramento County in 2005 by Governor Arnold Schwarzenegger. In December 2005 he became supervising judge of the Family and Probate Court.

== Personal life ==
Balonon is married to Theresa and they have two children: Spencer and Taylor.

== See also ==
- List of Asian American jurists
