= Sophia Y. Vuelo =

Hmong-American judge

Judge for the Ramsey County District Court
- Incumbent
- Assumed office January 4, 2018
- Preceded by: Margaret M. Marrinan

Personal details
- Born: Yeu Vue; 1971 or 1972 (age 54–55) Laos
- Education: University of Minnesota (BA); Hamline University School of Law (JD)

Sophia Y. Vuelo (born Yeu Vue) is a Hmong-American judge for the Second Judicial District in Ramsey County, Minnesota. She was appointed by Democratic governor Mark Dayton on November 30, 2017, to fill the vacancy created by the retirement of Judge Margaret M. Marrinan.

== Early life and education ==
Vuelo was born in Laos. Her father had been killed in combat prior to her birth. With her mother and siblings, she immigrated to Eau Claire, Wisconsin, where she attended Memorial High School, where she was senior class president in 1990. Her name was formerly Yeu Vue; she changed her first name to Sophia because her Hmong name was mispronounced, and when she married, joined her husband's last name, Lo, to hers to form Vuelo. Vuelo earned a BA in history in 1995 from the University of Minnesota, and a J.D. from the Hamline University School of Law.

== Career ==
Vuelo has worked as an assistant city attorney in Rochester, Minnesota, managing attorney and case manager at Catholic Charities, and assistant public defender and special assistant attorney in Ramsey County, Minnesota. She then ran her own law firm, dealing with juvenile detention, family and criminal cases, before being appointed a judge on the Ramsey County District Court in November 2017. She was sworn on January 4, 2018, becoming the first Hmong-American judge in Minnesota, and reportedly the third in the U.S.

== See also ==
- List of Asian American jurists
