= Nicholas Ranjan =

American judge (born 1978)

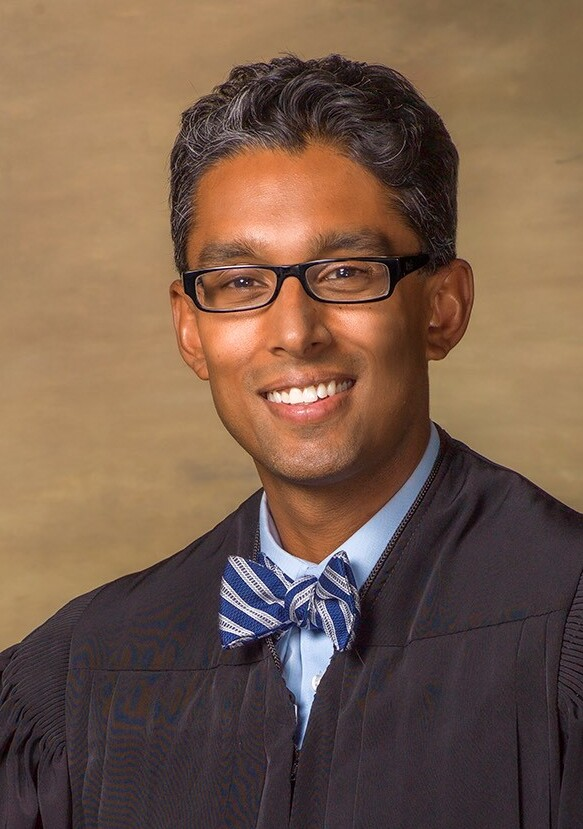

Judge of the United States District Court for the Western District of Pennsylvania
- Incumbent
- Assumed office July 12, 2019
- Appointed by: Donald Trump
- Preceded by: Kim R. Gibson

Personal details
- Born: 1978 (age 47–48) Lancaster, Ohio, U.S.
- Education: Grove City College (BA); University of Michigan (JD)

Jagan Nicholas Ranjan (born 1978) is a United States district judge of the United States District Court for the Western District of Pennsylvania.

== Education ==
Ranjan graduated from Grove City College in 2000 with a Bachelor of Arts, summa cum laude. He then attended the University of Michigan Law School, where he was a note editor of the Michigan Law Review. He graduated in 2003 with a Juris Doctor, cum laude.

== Career ==
Ranjan started his legal career by serving as a law clerk to Judge Deborah L. Cook of the United States Court of Appeals for the Sixth Circuit. Upon graduation from law school, Ranjan served as a Simon Karas Fellow with the Ohio Attorney General's Office, working with the state solicitor general on the office's major appeals.

From 2005 to 2019, Ranjan was an equity partner in the Pittsburgh, Pennsylvania, office of K&L Gates, where he litigated commercial, energy, and appellate matters. While at K&L Gates, he served on the firm's global pro bono and diversity committees, and directed his office's pro bono program—which was awarded "pro bono law firm of the year" in 2017 by the local bar association. He is active in the community, serving on legal diversity and symphony boards, as well as serving as a mentor to local middle school students.

=== Federal judicial service ===
On July 13, 2018, President Donald Trump announced his intent to nominate Ranjan to a seat on the United States District Court for the Western District of Pennsylvania. On July 24, 2018, his nomination was sent to the Senate. President Trump nominated Ranjan to the seat vacated by Judge Kim R. Gibson, who assumed senior status on June 3, 2016. On November 13, 2018, a hearing on his nomination was held before the Senate Judiciary Committee.

On January 3, 2019, his nomination was returned to the President under Rule XXXI, Paragraph 6 of the United States Senate, which provides that nominations not acted upon during a session are considered to have expired. On January 23, 2019, President Trump announced his intent to renominate Ranjan for a federal judgeship. His nomination was sent to the Senate later that day. On February 7, 2019, his nomination was reported out of committee by an 18–4 vote. On July 9, 2019, the Senate invoked cloture on his nomination by an 83–15 vote. On July 10, 2019, his nomination was confirmed by an 80–14 vote. He received judicial commission on July 12, 2019.

=== Notable rulings ===
- In August 2020, Ranjan ordered the Trump campaign to produce evidence of voter fraud in Pennsylvania by Friday, August 14. The Trump campaign must answer questions from Democratic groups, or admit to having no proof of election fraud. A hearing about the evidence was set for late September. On August 23, 2020, Ranjan issued a stay on the Trump campaign's lawsuit, pending the result of a similar state-level lawsuit.
- On October 10, 2020, in the case of Donald J. Trump for President, Inc. v. Boockvar, Ranjan granted judgment in favor of the Secretary of State of Pennsylvania, Kathy Boockvar, and denied the Trump campaign's claims of voter fraud and allowed ballot dropboxes to remain in service. In his decision, Ranjan concluded that "the plain language of the [Pennsylvania State] Election Code imposes no requirement for signature comparison for mail-in and absentee ballots and applications," a reasoning that was approvingly cited by the Pennsylvania Supreme Court on 23 October.

== Awards and recognition ==
Ranjan has been recognized by Chambers USA as one of the top commercial litigators in Pennsylvania multiple times, and has been a fellow with the Litigation Counsel of America and the Leadership Council on Legal Diversity.

== See also ==
- List of Asian American jurists

Legal offices
Preceded by Kim R. Gibson	Judge of the United States District Court for the Western District of Pennsylvania; 2019–present	Incumbent
