= Benes Z. Aldana =

American judge and USCG Captain

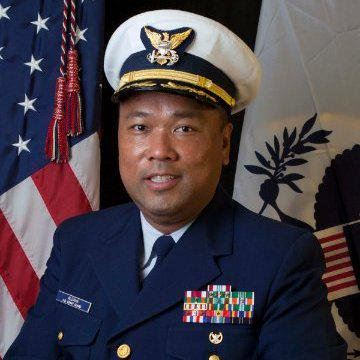
- Captain Aldana

Chief Trial Judge, USCG Court of Criminal Appeals
- In office May 2016 – June 2017

Staff Judge Advocate, USCG District Eight
- In office July 2013 – May 2016

Military Judge, USCG Legal Division
- In office May 2005 – June 2011

Personal details
- Born: Benes Z. Aldana; December 16, 1969 (age 56) Angeles City, Philippines
- Education: University of Washington School of Law
- Awards: DHS General Counsel's Award of Excellence; NAPABA Trailblazer Award; Asian Bar Association Judge of the Year; ABA Fellow

Military service
- Allegiance: United States
- Branch/service: United States Coast Guard
- Years of service: 1994–2017
- Rank: Captain
- Unit: United States Coast Guard Legal Division

Benes Zapanta Aldana (born 16 December 1969), is a retired United States Coast Guard captain and military lawyer who served as the Chief Trial Judge of the Coast Guard from 15 June 2016 until his retirement from military service in 2017. Aldana served as the first Asian Pacific (Filipino) American chief trial judge in U.S. military history. Aldana currently serves as president of the National Judicial College.

== Early life and education ==
Aldana was born in Angeles City, Philippines. When Aldana was ten years old, he immigrated to the United States along with his family after his father, a member of the United States Navy, was stationed in Maryland. His family then moved to Oak Harbor, Washington.

Aldana graduated cum laude from Seattle University in 1991 with a Bachelor of Arts degree in political science. While at Seattle University, Aldana served as Student Body President and as a Congressional Intern on Capitol Hill. He received a J.D. from University of Washington School of Law in 1994.

== Career ==
=== U.S. Coast Guard ===
Aldana joined the United States Coast Guard in 1994 as a Direct Commission Lawyer. After the 9/11 attacks on the World Trade Center, Aldana was deployed to Guantanamo Bay, Cuba, to assist the Department of Defense Criminal Investigation Task Force conducting investigations of detainees captured in the war on terrorism. Aldana also served in leadership roles as the Executive Officer of Coast Guard Base Seattle and the Commanding Officer of Personnel Services and Support Unit (PSSU) Seattle. Aldana served as a Military Trial Judge from 2005 through 2011 and as an Appellate Judge on the U.S. Coast Guard Court of Criminal Appeals from 2015 through 2016. On 15 June 2016, Aldana was appointed as the Chief Trial Judge of the U.S. Coast Guard. Aldana became the first Asian Pacific American to become a chief trial judge of a branch of the United States Armed Forces, as well as the first Filipino American to serve as chief trial judge in U.S. military history.

=== National Judicial College ===
After retiring from the United States Coast Guard, Aldana was unanimously selected by the National Judicial College Board of Trustees to serve as the organization's president and leader. Aldana officially assumed the duties of president on 1 May 2017. Aldana is the first former military judge and second person of color to lead the National Judicial College.

=== Bar Association activities ===
Throughout his military career, Aldana was an active member and leader in the American Bar Association (ABA). Aldana held positions on the ABA's Law and National Security Advisory Committee, the Rule of Law Initiative, the Commission on Diversity and Inclusion 360, ABA House of Delegates, ABA Standing Committee on Judicial Independence, and ABA ROLI MENA Council. He served as chair of the ABA Solo, Small Firm and General Practice Division and as an assembly speaker of the ABA Young Lawyers Division.

In addition to Aldana's support of the ABA, he also served as a fellow for the American Bar Foundation and was awarded as the Outstanding State Chair in 2011.

While stationed with the Coast Guard in Seattle, Aldana served as president of the Asian Bar Association of Washington and was a co-founding board member of the Filipino Lawyers of Washington, chair-elect of the Washington State Bar Legal Assistance to Military Personnel Section, and was the Washington State Supreme Court's appointee to the Civil Legal Aid Oversight Committee.

=== Awards ===
Aldana's awards include the Defense Meritorious Service Medal, the Meritorious Service Medal (2 awards), the Coast Guard Commendation Medal (5 awards), the Army Commendation Medal, the Coast Guard Achievement Medal (2 awards), and the Coast Guard Commandant's Letter of Commendation (2 awards).

Aldana has also received numerous recognitions outside of his military service, including the National Asian Pacific American Bar Association Senator Daniel Inouye Trailblazer Award (2015), Asian Bar Association of Washington Judge of the Year (2016), American Bar Association Outstanding Young Military Lawyer Award (2003), National Asian Pacific American Bar Association "Best Lawyer Under 40", (2003) the Emerging Filipino Leaders Award in the Field of Law (2009), and the American Bar Foundation Fellows Outstanding Chair Award (2011), Department of Homeland Security General Counsel's Award of Excellence (2016), Named Fellow by the American Bar Foundation (2006).

== Personal life ==
Aldana is married to Rowena Sevilla and has a son.

== See also ==
- List of Asian American jurists
