= Anuradha Vaitheswaran =

American lawyer and jurist

Judge of the Iowa Court of Appeals
- Incumbent
- Assumed office 1999
- Appointed by: Tom Vilsack

Personal details
- Born: Hyderabad, India
- Children: 2
- Education: Grinnell College (BA); University of Iowa (MA, JD)

Anuradha Vaitheswaran is an American lawyer and jurist serving as a judge of the Iowa Court of Appeals. She was appointed to the court by Governor Tom Vilsack in 1999.

== Early life and education ==
Vaitheswaran was born in Hyderabad, India, and raised in Cedar Rapids, Iowa. She earned a Bachelor of Arts degree from Grinnell College, a Master of Arts in political science from the University of Iowa, and a Juris Doctor from the University of Iowa College of Law.

== Career ==
Vaitheswaran served as a law clerk for Judge Charles R. Wolle during his time as a justice of the Iowa Supreme Court. Vaitheswaran also worked for the Legal Services Corporation of Iowa and the Office of the Iowa Attorney General. She was appointed to the Iowa Court of Appeals by Governor Tom Vilsack in 1999.

Vaitheswaran was an Institute of Judicial Administration summer fellow at the New York University School of Law during the 2007–2008 year. She has published articles on administrative law.
