= Joan Azrack =

American judge (born 1951)

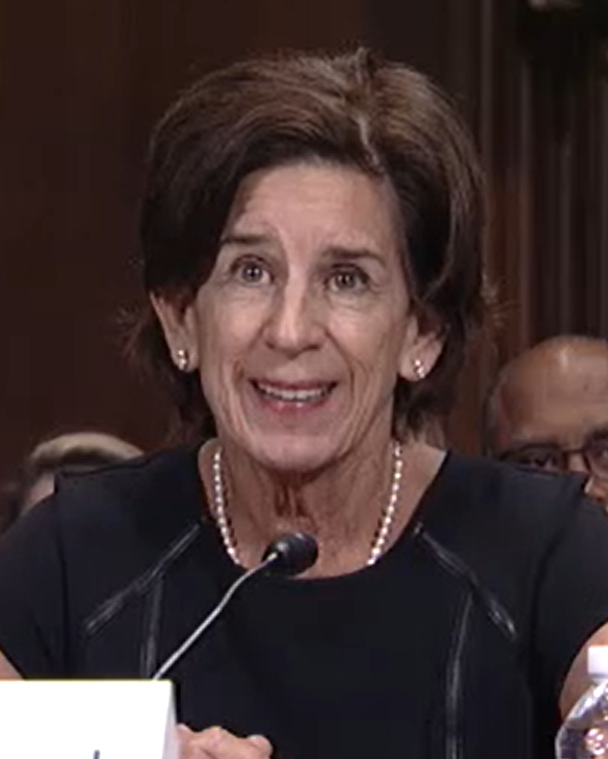

Senior Judge of the United States District Court for the Eastern District of New York
- Incumbent
- Assumed office December 19, 2024

Judge of the United States District Court for the Eastern District of New York
- In office December 19, 2014 – December 19, 2024
- Appointed by: Barack Obama
- Preceded by: Joanna Seybert
- Succeeded by: Sanket J. Bulsara

Magistrate Judge of the United States District Court for the Eastern District of New York
- In office 1990 – December 19, 2014

Personal details
- Born: Joan Marie Azrack Neptune Township, New Jersey, U.S.
- Education: Rutgers University (BS); New York Law School (JD)

Joan Marie Azrack (born in 1951) is an American lawyer who serves as a senior United States district judge of the United States District Court for the Eastern District of New York. She is a former United States magistrate judge of the same court.

== Biography ==
Azrack was born in 1951, in Neptune Township, New Jersey. She received a Bachelor of Science degree in 1974 from Rutgers University. She received a Juris Doctor in 1979 from New York Law School. She began her career as a trial attorney in the Criminal Division of the United States Department of Justice from 1979 to 1981. From 1982 to 1990, she was an Assistant United States Attorney in the Eastern District of New York, where she served as Deputy Chief of the Narcotics Section from 1985 to 1986 and as Deputy Chief of the Criminal Division and Chief of the Business and Securities Fraud Section from 1986 to 1990. From 1988 to 1991, Azrack was a visiting instructor at Harvard Law School.

=== Federal judicial service ===
From 1990 to 2014 she served as a United States magistrate judge in the Eastern District and as chief United States magistrate judge from 2000 to 2005.

On September 18, 2014, President Barack Obama nominated Azrack to serve as a United States district judge of the United States District Court for the Eastern District of New York, to the seat vacated by Judge Joanna Seybert, who assumed senior status on January 13, 2014. She received a hearing before the United States Senate Committee on the Judiciary on November 13, 2014. On December 11, 2014, her nomination was reported out of committee by voice vote. On Saturday, December 13, 2014 Senate Majority Leader Harry Reid filed a motion to invoke cloture on the nomination. On December 16, 2014, Reid withdrew his cloture motion on Azrack's nomination, and the Senate proceeded to vote to confirm Azrack in a voice vote. She received her federal judicial commission on December 19, 2014. She assumed senior status on December 19, 2024.

Legal offices
| Preceded by Joanna Seybert | Judge of the United States District Court for the Eastern District of New York; 2014–2024 | Succeeded by Sanket J. Bulsara |
