= Joanna Seybert =

American judge (born 1946)

Senior Judge of the United States District Court for the Eastern District of New York
- Incumbent
- Assumed office January 13, 2014

Judge of the United States District Court for the Eastern District of New York
- In office November 24, 1993 – January 13, 2014
- Appointed by: Bill Clinton
- Preceded by: Seat established by 104 Stat. 5089
- Succeeded by: Joan Azrack

Personal details
- Born: September 18, 1946 (age 79) Brooklyn, New York, U.S.
- Education: University of Cincinnati (BA); St. John's University (JD)

Joanna Seybert (born September 18, 1946) is a senior United States district judge of the United States District Court for the Eastern District of New York.

== Education and career ==
Seybert received a Bachelor of Arts degree from the University of Cincinnati in 1967 and a Juris Doctor from St. John's University School of Law in 1971. She began her legal career as a trial attorney for the Legal Aid Society in New York City from 1971 to 1973. She served as a senior trial attorney for the Federal Defender Services of the Legal Aid Society in Brooklyn, New York from 1973 to 1975. She was an attorney in private practice in Woodbury, Nassau County, New York in 1976 and 1979. She was a senior staff attorney for the Legal Aid Society in Nassau County, New York from 1976 to 1979. She served as Chief of the Major Litigation Bureau in Nassau County Attorney's Office from 1980 to 1987. She was a Judge of the Nassau County District Court from 1987 to 1991 and a Judge of the Nassau County Court from 1992 to 1993.

=== Federal judicial service ===
She was nominated to the United States District Court for the Eastern District of New York by President Bill Clinton on September 24, 1993, to a new seat created by 104 Stat. 5089, confirmed by the United States Senate on November 20, 1993, and received her commission on November 24, 1993. She assumed senior status on January 13, 2014.

Legal offices
Preceded by Seat established by 104 Stat. 5089	Judge of the United States District Court for the Eastern District of New York; 1993–2014	Succeeded by Joan Azrack
