= Tony Agbayani =

American lawyer and judge

Judge of the San Joaquin County Superior Court
- Incumbent
- Assumed office 2007
- Appointed by: Arnold Schwarzenegger

Personal details
- Born: Antonino James Agbayani, Jr. March 5, 1956 (age 70) Stockton, California, U.S.
- Party: Republican
- Spouse: Tonia
- Children: 9
- Education: California State University, Stanislaus (BA); University of California, Davis (JD)

Antonino "Tony" James Agbayani, Jr. (born March 5, 1956) is an American lawyer and judge from California. He is a judge on the Superior Court of San Joaquin County, California.

== Early life and education ==
He was born on March 5, 1956, in Stockton, California, and later graduated from East Union High School in 1974. He played trumpet in the school's marching band. He graduated from California State University, Stanislaus with a Bachelor of Arts in political science in 1978 and from the University of California, Davis School of Law with a Juris Doctor in 1981.

== Legal career ==
From 1983 to 1992 he was a deputy district attorney in the San Joaquin County District Attorney's Office. From 1992 to 2006 he was in private practice.

== Judicial service ==
From 2006 to 2007 he served as a court commissioner for the San Joaquin County Superior Court. In 2007 he was appointed a judge to the San Joaquin County Superior Court by Governor Arnold Schwarzenegger.

== Personal life & other activities ==
He and his wife Tonia have nine children. In 1985 he authored an article on animal cruelty, Animal Wrongs. He is based in Manteca, California and is also on the Faculty of Humphreys College Laurence Drivon School of Law.

== See also ==
- List of Asian American jurists
