= Tulare County Superior Court =

California superior court with jurisdiction over Tuolumne County

Superior Court of California, County of Tulare
- Established: 1852
- Jurisdiction: Tulare County, California
- Location: Main: Visalia; South: Porterville; North: Dinuba
- Appeals to: California Court of Appeal for the Fifth District
- Website: tulare.courts.ca.gov

Presiding Judge
- Currently: Hon. Nathan D. Ide

Assistant Presiding Judge
- Currently: Hon. Tara K. James

Court Executive Officer
- Currently: Stephanie Cameron

The Superior Court of California, County of Tulare (/tʊˈlɛəri/), informally known as the Tulare County Superior Court, is the California superior court with jurisdiction over Tulare County.

== History ==
Tulare County was formed in 1852 from parts of Mariposa County.

The first Tulare County Courthouse was a small log cabin "surrounded by a cheap fence" in the county seat of Visalia, California. The fence enclosed the county jail, which was five tree stumps with attached iron rings; prisoners were chained to the rings for security, and county officials stored records "in their hats and pockets." E. Jacobs described Visalia as "a weak and primitive settlement". A more permanent courthouse and jail were erected after a March 1854 County Board of Supervisors meeting. The second county courthouse was built in 1859, a two-story brick structure with a basement and a footprint of 40 by 60 feet (12 m × 18 m).

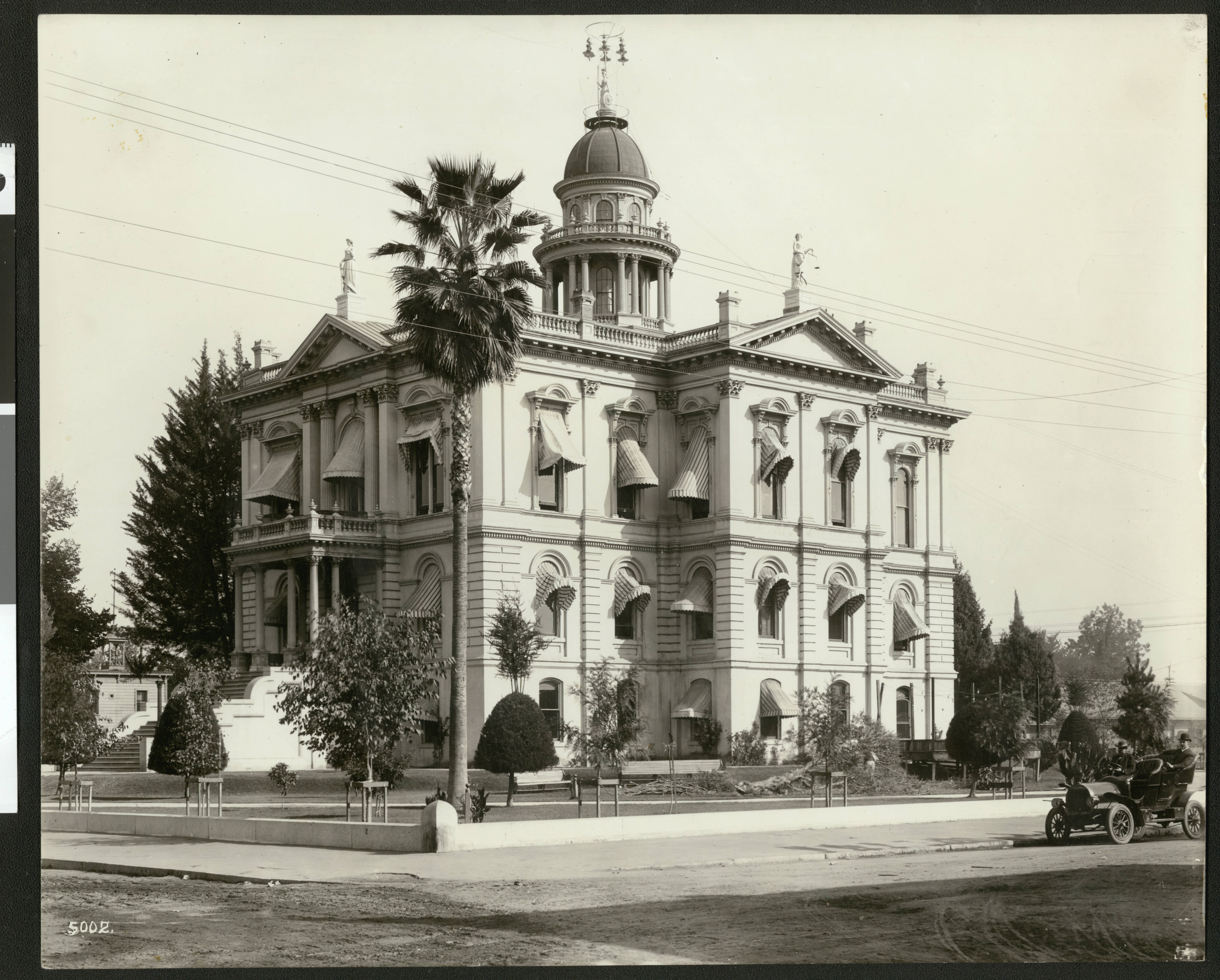
1876 Tulare County Courthouse (photographed in 1912 by Charles C. Pierce). Entrance faces the left side of the photograph, and one wing is visible.

The state legislature authorized the county to issue bonds to build a new courthouse in 1875. However, since the Southern Pacific railroad had bypassed Visalia when it built its route through Tulare County in 1872, the choice to locate the courthouse in Visalia was controversial, and the citizens of Visalia campaigned to have the new courthouse built in the city to ensure its survival. The County Board of Supervisors met on April 10, 1876 to plan for the erection of a new courthouse; the cornerstone was laid on October 28. The original County Courthouse and Jail was sold at auction. The 1876 Courthouse was designed by A. A. Bennett, Esq., of San Francisco and had two courtrooms (one for the county, and one for the district). The brick building had a footprint of 60 by 95 feet (18 m × 29 m) (W×D), with wings on either side measuring 12 by 31 feet (3.7 m × 9.4 m) (W×D).

1935 Tulare County Courthouse (photographed by John Margolies)

Planning for a new courthouse started in November 1922, when the Board announced it had obtained an option to purchase five blocks for the new facility. The new courthouse was not completed until 1935.

The present courthouse was completed in 1957 to a design by David Horn. Upon completion, payments to Horn were delayed over allegations of poor workmanship and faulty design.

== Venues ==
Tulare County Superior Court locations:
1 Main, 221 S Mooney Blvd (Visalia)
Family Law, 3400 W Mineral King (Visalia)
2 South County, 300 E Olive Ave (Porterville)
3 North County, 640 S Alta Ave (Dinuba)
4 Juvenile Justice, 11200 Ave 368 (Visalia)
Pretrial facility, 36650 Road 112 (Visalia)

The main courthouse for Tulare County Superior Court is in Visalia, with two satellite courthouses in Porterville and Dinuba. In addition, there are separate juvenile and family law facilities in Visalia.
