= Brewbaker v. Regents =

2013 unanimous decision of the Iowa Court of Appeals

- Court: Iowa Court of Appeals
- Full case name: Brewbaker v. State of Iowa Board of Regents
- Decided: October 23, 2013
- Citations: N.W.2d -, (Iowa 2013)

Case history
- Prior action: Application for review of agency action denied in Polk County District Court (affirmed)

Court membership
- Judges sitting: Vogel, Danilson, and Tabor,

Case opinions
- Majority: Judge Vogel (unanimous)

Keywords
- Double jeopardy; Separation of powers; Free speech; Due process; Equal protection; Abuse of discretion

Brewbaker v. Regents, - N.W.2d - (Iowa 2013), was a unanimous decision of the Iowa Court of Appeals dated October 23, 2013, that held it does not violate double jeopardy or separation of powers for an administrative agency to modify the terms of probation to deny State educational services following a criminal judgement hearing if the modification protects "the integrity of the community".

== Issues ==
Double jeopardy, Separation of powers, Free speech, Due process, Equal protection, and Abuse of discretion

== Prior proceedings ==
Brewbaker was charged with simple misdemeanor annoying speech. Under Iowa Court Rule 2.67(6) Brewbaker was only allowed a jury of six members. Upon a guilty verdict Brewbaker was fined $65 in the District Court for Story County Iowa on an annoying speech conviction in November 2009 and placed on one year of probation. Brewbaker applied for discretionary appeal to the Iowa Supreme Court on grounds that the term 'annoying' was void for vagueness, see Coates v. Cincinnati, but the application was denied.

Subsequently, the Iowa Board of Regents in a public hearing upheld a modification to Brewbaker's probation suspending him from State educational services at Iowa State University for the same transaction as the simple misdemeanor. Brewbaker's application for review of agency action to the District Court for Polk County was denied.

== Subsequent proceedings ==
Brewbaker applied for further review on November 12, 2013, noting Vogel gave a false account of the facts in Kocher to frame it as controlling instead of Dressler where the conviction preceded administrative sanctions.

See State v. Kocher, 542 N.W.2d 556, 558 (Iowa 1996) (holding the administrative revocation of a driver’s license following a conviction for driving while intoxicated did not violate the Double Jeopardy Clause, as the administrative proceeding was remedial)...

The narrow issue in these consolidated appeals is whether the double jeopardy provision of the Fifth Amendment to the United States Constitution bars prosecution of a defendant in an OWI case if the defendant's license has previously been suspended through administrative proceedings. We conclude that it does not.

The Iowa Supreme Court denied further review. On March 3, 2014, Iowa Court of Appeals Chief Judge Danielson entered an order for publication. Publication, if accepted by the Iowa Supreme Court, would also overturn Klouda v. Sixth Judicial Dist. Dept. giving the Iowa executive branch new powers to independently modify conditions of probation set by criminal courts.

== See also ==
- Ex parte Lange.
