= Iowa Court of Appeals =

Appellate court in Iowa, US

The Iowa Court of Appeals is the intermediate-level appellate court of the state of Iowa. Its purpose is to review appeals from trial court decisions which are referred to the court by the Iowa Supreme Court. The court decides the vast majority of appeals filed from trial courts in the state of Iowa, and its decisions are final unless further review is granted by the Iowa Supreme Court.

== Judges of the court ==
The court is composed of nine judges. Each judge is appointed for one year by the governor, from a list of nominees composed by the State Judicial Nominating Commission. The judge will then serve a one-year term before facing a retention election. If the judge is reelected, his/her term will normally be six years. The retirement age is 78, after which some judges take senior status.

The judges elect the Chief Judge from among themselves every two years. The chief judge functions as the administrative head of the court.

As of July 2, 2024, the nine judges of the Iowa Court of Appeals are:

Name	Born	Start	Term ends	Mandatory retirement	Appointer	Law school
Mary Tabor, Chief Judge	1963 (age 62–63)	April 28, 2010	2030	2041	Chet Culver (D)	Iowa
Sharon Soorholtz Greer	December 3, 1955 (age 70)	April 27, 2019	2032	2033	Kim Reynolds (R)	Iowa
Julie Schumacher	August 7, 1967 (age 59)	August 29, 2019	2032	2045	Kim Reynolds (R)	Creighton
Paul Ahlers	1969 (age 56–57)	November 27, 2019	2028	2047	Kim Reynolds (R)	Iowa
Gina Badding	May 27, 1979 (age 47)	July 22, 2021	2028	2057	Kim Reynolds (R)	Iowa
Mary Chicchelly	December 1, 1967 (age 58)	December 7, 2021	2030	2045	Kim Reynolds (R)	Iowa
Tyler Buller	1988 (age 37–38)	October 26, 2022	2030	2066	Kim Reynolds (R)	Iowa
Sam Langholz	1979 (age 46–47)	August 9, 2023	2030	2057	Kim Reynolds (R)	Iowa
John Sandy	July 28, 1984 (age 42)	June 28, 2024	2032	2062	Kim Reynolds (R)	St. Thomas

== Former judges ==
- Terry L. Huitink (1994–2008)

== Case law ==
- Brewbaker v. Regents, N.W.2d - (Iowa 2013)

== See also ==
- Courts of Iowa
