= Alameda County Superior Court =

Court in California

Superior Court of California, County of Alameda

Superior Court overview
- Jurisdiction: California; Alameda County, California
- Superior Court executives: Thomas Nixon, Presiding Judge; Chad Finke, Chief Executive Officer
- Website: alameda.courts.ca.gov

The Superior Court of California, County of Alameda, informally the Alameda County Superior Court, is the California superior court with jurisdiction over Alameda County as established by Article VI of the Constitution of California. It functions as the trial court for both criminal and civil cases filed in Alameda County.

== History ==
The original courthouse was established on June 6, 1853, in Alvarado, California (a part of present-day Union City). After the county seat moved to Oakland (from San Leandro), a new courthouse was built in 1875, locating near Oakland's Washington Square. However, the building quickly fell into disrepair by the mid-1920s to a point where bailiffs had to hold umbrellas for judges due to leaks. On April 3, 1934, county residents voted overwhelming in support for a bond initiative to build a new county courthouse. The new building was built on the edge of Lake Merritt, where it still stands today, as the René C. Davidson Courthouse. The old courthouse was demolished in 1949. The court currently occupies a number of courthouses throughout the county.

In 1925, future Chief Justice of the U.S. Supreme Court Earl Warren was appointed (and later elected) District Attorney of Alameda County.

== Courthouses ==
Alameda County Superior Court locations:
1 René C. Davidson Courthouse (Oakland)
2 Wiley W. Manuel Courthouse (Oakland)
3 Hayward Hall of Justice
4 George E. McDonald Hall of Justice (Alameda)
5 Berkeley Courthouse
6 Fremont Hall of Justice
7 Juvenile Justice Center (San Leandro)
8 East County Hall of Justice (Dublin)

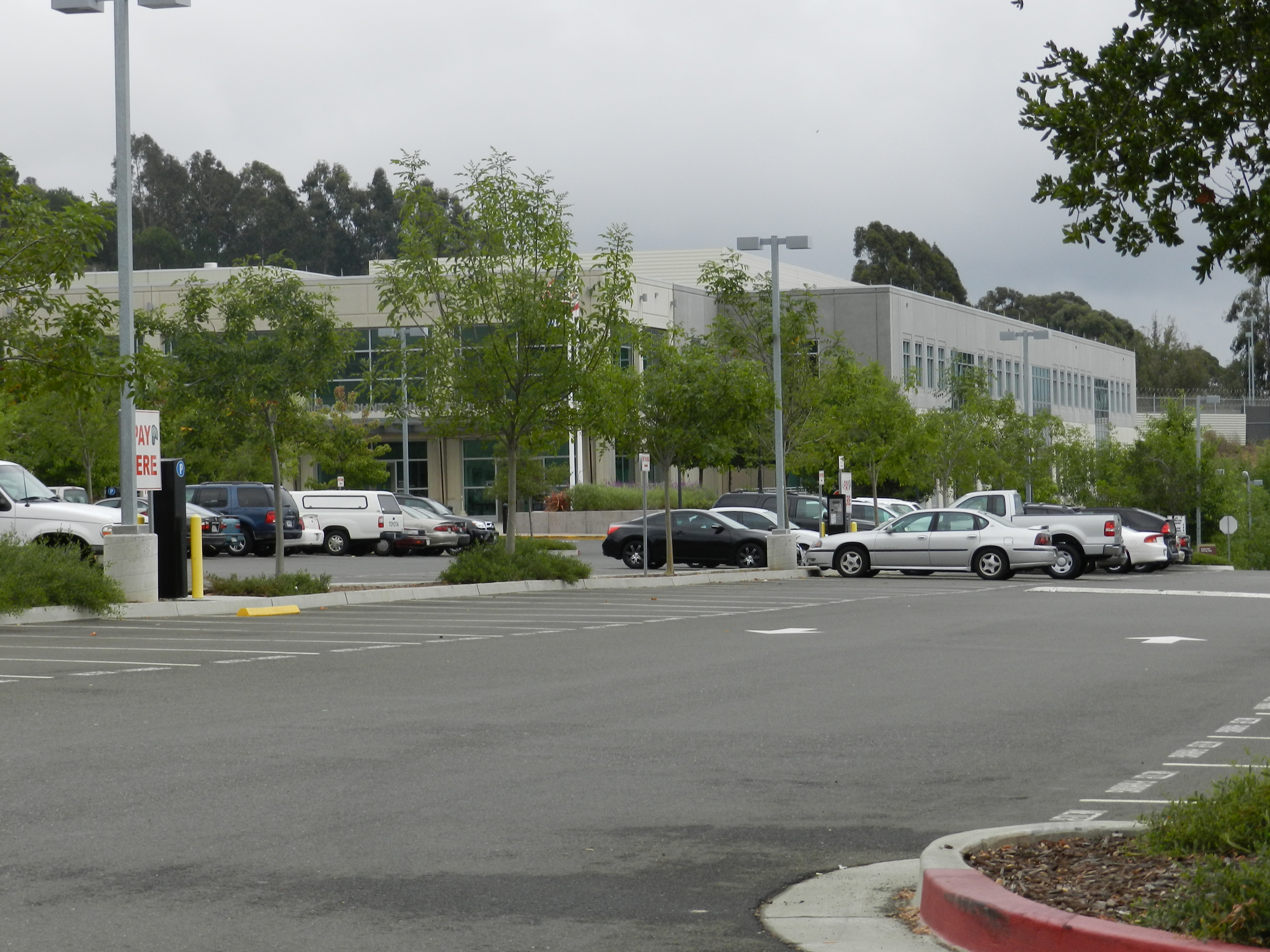
Juvenile Justice Center

- René C. Davidson Courthouse, built in 1934 in Oakland to house the entire Alameda County Superior Court.
  - Used mostly for felony criminal cases. Includes a civil division clerk's office (e.g. for filing restraining orders) and appeals unit.
- Wiley W. Manuel Courthouse, Oakland, named for Associate Justice Wiley Manuel of the California Supreme Court.
  - Used for criminal cases, mostly misdemeanors.
- Hayward Hall of Justice, located in Hayward, the largest full service courthouse in Alameda County
  - Used mostly for civil matters, including family law and restraining orders.
- George E. McDonald Hall of Justice, Alameda
- Berkeley Courthouse, Berkeley
- Fremont Hall of Justice, Fremont
- Juvenile Justice Center, San Leandro
- East County Hall of Justice, Dublin (opened June 21, 2017)

== Jails ==
- Santa Rita Jail in Dublin, California
- Glenn Dyer Jail in Oakland, California

== Criminal Procedure ==
As a California trial court, the Alameda County Superior Court follows the same steps of criminal procedure as do all courts statewide.

1. Arrest (usually kept in jail at Santa Rita Jail)
2. Arraignment (usually at Wiley Manuel Courthouse, Rene C Davidson Courthouse, or East County Hall of Justice)
3. Preliminary Examination (for felonies)
4. Pre-Trial
5. Trial
6. Sentencing (if convicted)
7. Appeal (convicted defendants have the right to appeal both misdemeanors and felonies, and the right to be released on bail pending the outcome of the appeal for misdemeanors)

== Administration ==
Pursuant to California Government Code § 68070 and the Judicial Council California Rules of Court § 10.613, the Alameda County Superior Court has adopted Local Rules for its government and the government of its officers.

Pursuant to California Rule of Court 2.506 and Government Code Section 68150(h), courts may impose fees for the costs of providing access to its electronic records. Several superior courts do so, including Alameda, Los Angeles, Riverside, Sacramento, and San Diego, and the fees have been criticized as exorbitant and extraordinarily high, with the Alameda County Superior Court fees being the subject of a MoveOn.org petition.

== Officers ==
There are several officers of the court, including judges, jurors, commissioners, prosecutors, defense attorneys, clerks, bailiffs, and court reporters.

=== Judges ===
- Victoria Kolakowski, first transgender trial judge in the United States
- Thomas Reardon, judge in the Yusuf Bey IV trial for the murder of Chauncey Bailey.
- Roy Hashimoto
- Dennis Hayashi

=== Commissioners ===
A commissioner is a subordinate judicial officer elected by the judges of the Court and given the power to hear and make decisions in certain kinds of legal matters, similar to the United States magistrate judge. Their jurisdiction includes, but is not limited to, traffic matters, family law and juvenile cases, criminal misdemeanors, and criminal felony cases through the preliminary hearing stage.

=== Prosecutors ===
The Alameda County District Attorney, currently Nancy O'Malley, prosecutes crimes before the Court on behalf of Superior Court of California, Alameda County, and all cities and special districts within Alameda County.

=== Public Defenders ===
The Alameda County Public Defender was the third public defender's office created in the nation, chartered in 1927 by Earl Warren, who would later go on to become Chief Justice of the United States Supreme Court. During its first year, the office employed two lawyers.

Today, there are over a hundred lawyers, twenty investigators and a support staff of forty, who together handle approximately 50,000 cases a year. In 2012, the office was named the "Best Law Firm" in the East Bay by the Alameda County Bar Association. The current head of the Public Defender's Office is Brendon Woods.

=== Clerks ===
The court clerks are responsible for clerical courtroom activities, interacting with the attorneys and the public, administering oaths, assisting with the impaneling juries, and are responsible for the inventory and safe-keeping of the exhibits.

=== Bailiffs ===
The functions of the bailiff are carried out by Alameda County Sheriff, currently Yesenia Sanchez, under contract.
