= Elreta Alexander-Ralston =

American judge (1919–1998)

Judge of the Guilford County, North Carolina District Court
- In office December 2, 1968 – April 1, 1981

Personal details
- Born: March 21, 1919 Smithfield, North Carolina
- Died: March 14, 1998 (aged 78)
- Education: North Carolina Agricultural and Technical State University (BA), Columbia University (LLB)

Elreta Narcissus Alexander-Ralston (née Melton; March 21, 1919 – March 14, 1998) was an American trial attorney and district court judge in North Carolina. She was the first black woman to become a judge via popular election in the U.S., the first black judge elected in North Carolina, and the first black woman to practice law in North Carolina. With an unusual career, she has been noted for her “refusal to allow the circumstances of her birth, the realities of her time, and the limitations imposed by others define her destiny.” However, Alexander-Ralston's legacy has remained largely unrecognized, with her story untold for many years.

== Early life ==
Elreta Narcissus Melton was born on March 21, 1919, in the small town of Smithfield, North Carolina. Her parents, Joseph C. Melton and Alain A. Reynolds Melton, were both teachers, and Joseph later became a Baptist minister. Elreta had two older siblings. The family moved to Scotland Neck, North Carolina soon after Elreta was born, and in 1925, they moved to Danville, Virginia, where Alain taught and Joseph was pastor at the Loyal Baptist Church.

Alexander-Ralston's father, Joseph was her mother Alain's high school teacher, and they started dating before she was transferred from his class, marrying after she finished her second year of college. Alexander-Ralston stated that her mother had married her father to be able to leave home, and did not want to marry a preacher. Alexander-Ralston's maternal grandparents had an interracial relationship but her grandfather, a white shopkeeper, kept his store segregated and their family had colorist prejudices. However, her father Joseph was an acceptable match to them due to his education from Shaw University, job as a minister, and light-colored skin.

Alexander-Ralston's parents believed strongly in education, and she remembered her father declaring that "nobody was going to sleep under his roof without a college education." Her schooling started early when her mother put her in the first grade as a four-year-old, at the school her mother taught. Her father tutored his children after school in reading, math, Greek and Latin, and her mother taught dancing and singing, pushing back against the formalities often demanded in the Baptist tradition at that time. Alexander-Ralston's parents, like many other middle-class black families at the time, refused to engage with the racial injustice of exposing their children to segregated spaces. The children were prohibited from using segregated buses or buildings, with the exception being school, where segregated public schools were the only option.

After spending about twelve years in Danville, Virginia, the family returned to North Carolina, this time to the bustling metropolis of Greensboro. Her mother stayed in Danville for a year, not wanting to leave her life behind and having a strained relationship with her husband, and seeing her children only on weekends for that year. Alexander-Ralston idolized her father and wanted to become a minister like him, but she also later praised her mother for her professional and personal drive, labeling her a progressive woman.

Alexander-Ralston graduated from James B. Dudley High School in 1934. In 1937, at the age of eighteen, Alexander-Ralston graduated from North Carolina Agricultural & Technical College in Greensboro with a B.S. in music.

== Career ==
Upon graduation, Alexander-Ralston became a high-school teacher of math, music, and history in both South and North Carolina, and worked in the A&T library.

=== Law school ===
Alexander-Ralston was inspired to go to law school after campaigning for her friend Reverend Sharpe, who was running to be the first black city councilmember for Greensboro. Sharpe narrowly lost due to white candidates buying the votes of black voters, and this loss felt devastating to Alexander-Ralston. Sharpe told her that he believed the racial injustice of politics would improve one day, and he encouraged her to channel her frustration into action, bringing her a copy of Blackstone's Commentaries and encouraging her to become a much-needed lawyer to represent black people fairly in Greensboro.

Due to the limited access to law schools in North Carolina for black women, Alexander-Ralston applied to and was the first black woman admitted to Columbia Law School in 1943 at the age of 24. The significance of this achievement is highlighted by the fact that only a few black students, all men, had been admitted before her. She faced immense pressure from Columbia to demonstrate that black women belonged at the school, starting when the law school Dean Young B. Smith told her that she was the first black woman they'd ever admitted, and the admissions office would watch her performance before admitting other black women. She later recalled that she was so stressed that she could not hear the first six weeks of lectures. Evidently, Alexander-Ralston impressed the school, because over the next few years, they admitted more black women, including another future judge the next year, Constance Baker Motley, and later Edith Bornn, Carmel Carrington Marr, and Clarice Bryant.

Alexander-Ralston was nervous about the lack of professional possibilities for black lawyers in North Carolina and concerned about being away from her husband for so long. At one point, she requested to go on a semester's leave. However, her husband and Dean Smith encouraged her to stay. She did not go on leave, became very popular among faculty and students, and due to Columbia's accelerated program during World War II, became the first black woman to graduate from Columbia Law School in 1945.

=== Bar exam ===
Alexander-Ralston attempted to return to Greensboro to practice law in 1945, but a series of racist policies prevented her from taking the bar exam there. Even after intercession from many Columbia contacts, and growing press coverage in Greensboro, she was ignored by the North Carolina Board of Law Examiners until she decided to wait them out by working in New York. Her legal career started in Harlem where she was a law clerk at Dyer & Stevens from 1945 to 1947. She advocated for herself in order to gain trial experience. In one of her first courtroom appearances in 1946, she argued for the employees of Delaware Lackawanna railroad in front of the U.S. Court of Appeals for the Second District after the lead attorney was away and she won the case. She also won a landlord-tenant dispute that she said her firm did not actually want or believe she could win.

In 1946, she once again attempted to take the North Carolina bar exam using credentials she had earned. However, despite her credentials, she faced racial discrimination, along with resentment for having practiced law in the North, to get around North Carolina's racial restrictions. A new requirement was given, that she had to be a North Carolina resident for 12 months before taking the bar. To become eligible, Alexander-Ralston was forced to change her residence, and commuted every week to work in New York. It was through concerted campaigning and community networking that Alexander-Ralston was ever allowed to take the bar. Finally in 1947, her neighbor Fannie White interceded on her behalf, as White was a trusted housekeeper to the locally powerful Rucker family, and knew that Pierce Rucker was about to dine with Governor Robert Gregg Cherry. Two days later, Rucker asked White to bring Alexander-Ralston to his home to interview her. Convincing him to stand up for her, Rucker then called Herbert Falk, a prominent local attorney, who then convinced the bar association to let Alexander-Ralston take the test.She eventually passed the North Carolina bar exam in 1947. She then became the first black woman to practice law in North Carolina. However, Ruth Whitehead Whaley was the first black woman admitted to the North Carolina bar, in 1933, but she never practiced in the state.

=== Trial attorney ===
Alexander-Ralston was a trial attorney for 21 years, establishing a large solo criminal practice as soon as she arrived in Greensboro. Her practice thrived, gaining clients frequently from her father and husband's networks. Six months after she started, she took Bill Godfrey's case. He was her first white client, a friend of hers who had received a major speeding ticket. At the time, it was almost unheard-of for black attorneys to represent white clients, but Godfrey begged her to help, and she checked that it would be permitted by the presiding judge before proceeding. She got Godfrey a good outcome and proceeded to pick up more white clients, along with the black clients she'd always represented. She began to build a reputation as a brilliant trial attorney and gained the respect of other attorneys. She was also known for wearing elaborate, fashionable outfits to court and building performances out of cases to cleverly tell a story to the jury.

Alexander-Ralston honed her DWI case experience by working with Herbert Parks, an established black attorney. Previously, Parks had been a minister and custodian for the law firm Henderson & Henderson. He so thoroughly impressed the partners with his drive for learning the law, that they "read law" with him and got permission for him to take the bar exam by convincing the association that he wouldn't be able to pass if he took the test. When he passed in 1937, the partners passed him unwanted DWI cases to help him and avoid undesirable cases.

Alexander-Ralston later formed the firm Alston, Alexander, Pell & Pell, one of the first integrated firms in the South. She turned down a Time magazine cover feature after this, stating at the time that she didn't found the firm to be the first, but to be successful. She won a suit against the Greensboro City Council to lift their stonewalling of a housing project for black residents, which indirectly resulted in the election of the first black city council member, and allowed for the first federal housing project for black people in the U.S. She helped found the first municipal golf course for black people in Greensboro, and earned notoriety for representing white defendants, including Ku Klux Klan men (some of whom left the Klan after respecting her representation of them). Alexander-Ralston was also notable for being the first black woman to argue before the Supreme Court of North Carolina.

Alexander-Ralston frequently worked toward integration: she argued for integrating the existing whites-only golf course, and while not successful, this is what led the city to make the concession of creating its first course for black people, while maintaining segregation. She used personal performance to make points as well, whether by following rules and norms or breaking them. She personally integrated the boutique Montaldos in 1950, and would wear high fashion into the segregated courtrooms of the 1950s and make her fellow lawyers and judges beg her to agree to exceptions to their discrimination after she sat next to working-class people in the black section, exploiting their discomfort rooted in colorism and classism. She was not afraid to talk back to offensive lawyers and deployed biting and sarcastic responses when they belittled her, frequently couching deep critiques in jokes and legal points.

In 1964, Alexander-Ralston defended Charles Donald Yoes, one of four black men accused of raping a white woman in the case State v. Yoes. This case became one of North Carolina's longest, and was argued up to the state Supreme Court where she had challenged the racially-biased selection of jurors. The case was lost on appeal but is credited for making jury selection fairer in North Carolina by inspiring the creation of the state's Jury Commission. Alexander-Ralston later said this case inspired her to become a judge, because it was a "kangaroo court" and her side didn't stand a chance.

=== District court judge ===
In 1968, North Carolina started to require that almost all their judges be elected to the bench rather than appointed. Guilford County's District Court had six seats open. Alexander-Ralston was asked by both the Democratic and Republican parties to run for district court judge, and she chose to change parties and run as a Republican. She wanted to expand North Carolina's political landscape from widely Democrat to more competitively Republican, and additionally wanted to pressure the Democrats into supporting more women and black candidates. Her campaign ads had two focuses: one set emphasized her education and Republican status, and the others focused on her historic candidacy, telling voters she was the only woman running and that "the symbol of justice is a woman."

Alexander-Ralston had the third-most votes in the county election, earning a spot on the district court bench. Therefore, in November 1968, Alexander-Ralston became the first black judge elected in North Carolina, and the first black woman to be elected a district court judge anywhere in the United States. She was also the second black judge to be elected anywhere in the U.S. At this point, she was very respected as an attorney in the community, and although some white citizens were vocally against her election as a black woman, many white citizens of Greensboro tried to separate her from their prejudices against black people, saying that her election wasn't a big deal because she was a well-known good attorney. However, black citizens of Greensboro celebrated the election, with many people attending to see her first day, including the principal from her high school and members of the NAACP. She continued as a judge for many years, and was re-elected in 1972, 1976, and 1980.

Although she faced concerted efforts to remove or discredit her over her career, she continued to be immensely respected, and was ranked as the best judge in the district in a poll of attorneys at one point. Former North Carolina Supreme Court Chief Justice Henry Frye said that she was incredibly hard-working, and had once given him the "worst chewing out of anybody" as a district court judge but he respected the chiding. He praised her as the best cross-examiner he'd known, skilled at quickly evaluating and working a witness. Frye also said that she was very disrespected by some attorneys at the start of her term, and she was able to kindly but firmly make them respect her. She became affectionately known as "Judge A" to the local community while on the court.

In 1969 she began one of her most notable accomplishments as a judge: "Judgment Day," which focused on rehabilitating young offenders and misdemeanants as an alternative to incarceration and criminal records. Once a year, on Judgment Day, participants would meet up and report on their progress on projects that helped their own lives or those of their loved ones. They were encouraged to support each other much like an Alcoholics Anonymous group would. Although this program repeatedly came under attack by the state, especially as a trend of heavy incarcerations grew in the U.S., it avoided closure until 1980, when previous changes in state law accumulated and the Guilford County District Attorney, Mike Schlosser, declared that only he could decide when to reduce charges.

=== Chief Justice campaign and private practice ===
Alexander-Ralston ran for the Republican nomination for Chief Justice of the North Carolina Supreme Court in 1974. This was a position that had been held by Democrats for so long that Republicans often didn't support competitive candidates for it. No woman or black person had ever held the position. Alexander-Ralston ran without informing or asking the state's Republican party for permission, and she refused to hide her gender or race during her campaign, pushing back against the advisors who told her to do so to avoid sexist or racist backlash. She faced an uphill battle during her campaign, because Susie Sharp, a white woman, was running unopposed with much voter enthusiasm on the Democratic ticket. This was also a midterm election with a statewide electorate that knew her less than Guilford County did, and a time period in which the Republican Party turned against the Civil Rights movement, all of which made racial prejudice factor more against her. These headwinds caused her to lose the Republican nomination to James Newcomb, a fire extinguisher salesman with no college degree or legal background. However, her loss prompted outrage and a later-adopted constitutional amendment requiring judges be attorneys licensed in North Carolina.

Alexander-Ralston surprised many when she announced her retirement in 1981: she was legally allowed to be a judge for eight more years and was still highly respected. She retired April 1, 1981, and rejoined private practice by forming a new firm, Alexander-Ralston, Pell & Speckhard, with her former partners, the Pell brothers, along with two Speckhard brothers. She changed her caseload this time, prioritizing more pro bono work and domestic cases alongside her past choices.

=== Outreach ===
Throughout her career, Alexander-Ralston engaged in public service and outreach to promote the issues she cared about. She frequently spoke for a variety of organizations: civic, religious, educational, governmental, fraternal, youth, and senior citizens. She also served on the Drug Action Council board, and the board of advisors to the North Carolina Symphony. In 1974, she spoke to a speech class at the University of North Carolina, Chapel Hill: she was the first black judge that student Patricia Timmons-Goodson met, and her commanding speech and beautiful attire inspired Timmons-Goodson to become a judge like her later.

Alexander-Ralston took a special interest in outreach for youth. Beyond her "Judgement Day" innovation, she engaged in educational efforts by allowing classes to attend court, and encouraged student involvement in the court system. She was on the Board of Disadvantaged Students at the University of North Carolina, Greensboro, and the Board of Visitors for Appalachian State University.

== Honors and awards ==
In 1969, the Greensboro Chamber of Commerce gave her the Dolly Madison Award for uplifting women's careers. In 1969 and 1970, she was named most-admired black citizen of Greensboro by Guys and Dolls, Inc and they later made her an honorary member. In 1970, she also received the Citizenship Award from the Cherokee Council of the Boy Scouts of America.

In 1976, she received the Brotherhood Citation from the National Conference of Christians and Jews Greensboro chapter. In 1977, the North Carolina Federation of Women's Clubs named her in the top 25 most distinguished women in North Carolina. In 1980, she was invited to the White House to dine with First Lady Rosalynn Carter at a reception for Distinguished Negro Women.

Courtroom 2A in the Guilford County Courthouse is named after Alexander-Ralston, also containing a portrait of her.

In 1990, she was invited to a banquet honoring pioneering black women lawyers, hosted by the North Carolina Bar Association. In 1992, she was one of three Greensboro citizens to be inducted into the Junior Achievement of the Triad's Hall of Fame.

In 2021, she received the Legal Legends of Color Award from the North Carolina Bar Association.

== Personal life and death ==
Alexander-Ralston's first marriage was to Girardeau “Tony” Alexander II, a physician who she had met in college. They secretly eloped in Asheboro, North Carolina on June 7, 1938, with Alexander-Ralston's large misgivings overruled by Tony's pressuring. The couple had one son, Girardeau Alexander III (born October 4, 1950). Alexander-Ralston said later that Tony engaged in affairs and was abusive, and she started distancing herself from him and carrying a gun. Her mother died in 1964, and her father in 1968, and two months later, Alexander-Ralston divorced Tony. They lived separately but she became his primary caretaker as his health worsened, until his death in 1976.

In 1979, Alexander-Ralston married John D. Ralston, a white retired judge from the IRS Appellate Division. She told press at the time that he had a great sense of humor and made her happier than she thought she could be, a stark contrast to what she described as the traumatic 30 years of her first marriage. John died in 1983.

Alexander-Ralston's son had schizophrenia and although she spent a lot of time trying to find education and caretaking solutions for him, Girardeau increasingly had unpredictable violent outbursts. In 1990, he killed his caretaker, Eula Mae Rankin, and was sentenced to fifteen years in prison, although he lived the rest of his life in a group home instead. Alexander-Ralston's coworkers noted the toll that her son's troubles took on her health.

Alexander-Ralston died on March 14, 1998, and her ashes were buried in Greensboro, with no funeral or memorial service at her request.

== See also ==
- List of African-American jurists
- List of first women lawyers and judges in North Carolina
