= List of first women lawyers and judges in North Carolina =

This is a list of the first women lawyer(s) and judge(s) in North Carolina. It includes the year in which the women were admitted to practice law (in parentheses). Also included are women who achieved other distinctions such as becoming the first in their state to graduate from law school or become a political figure.

== Firsts in North Carolina's history ==
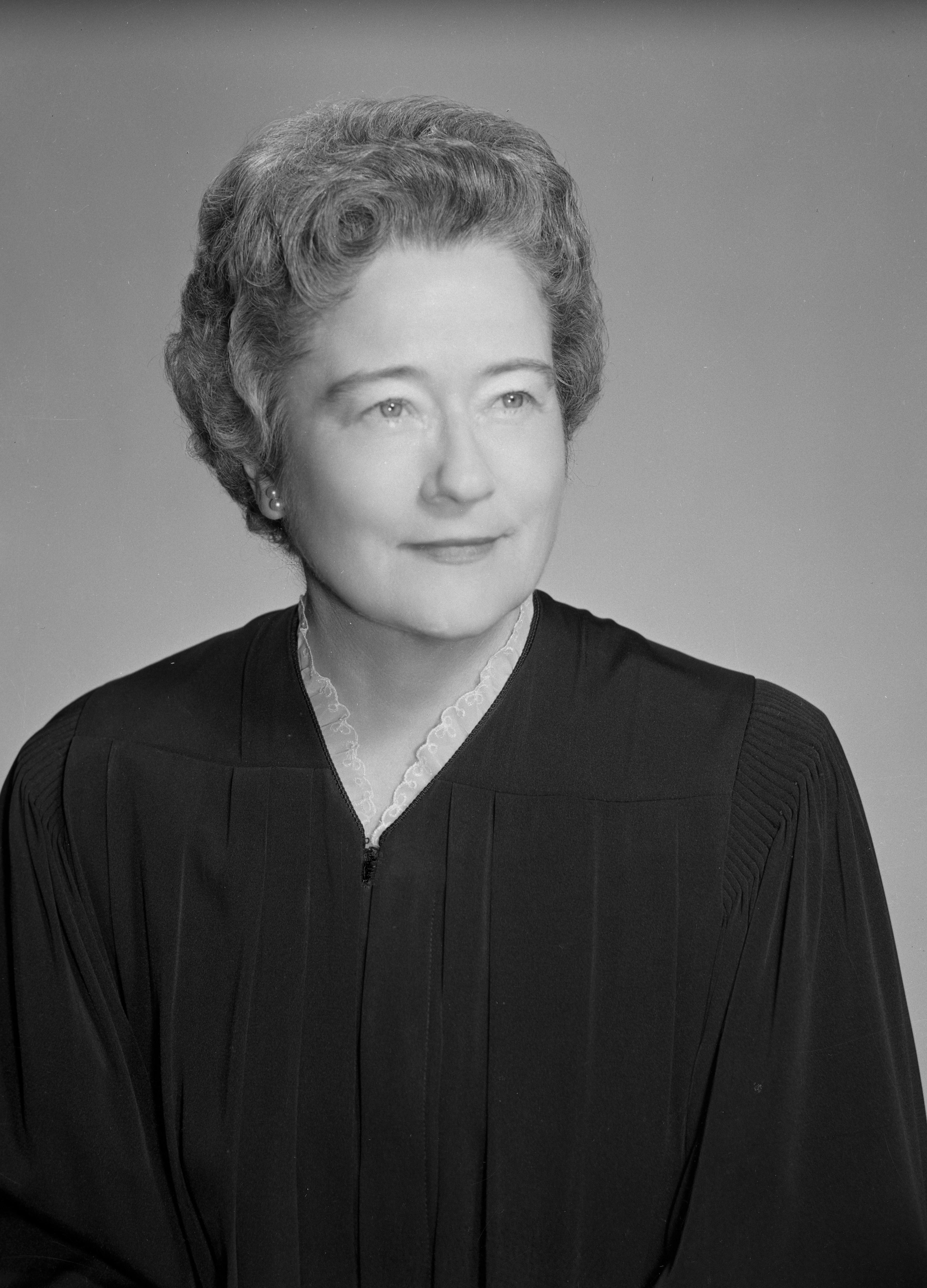
Susie Sharp: First female judge in North Carolina history

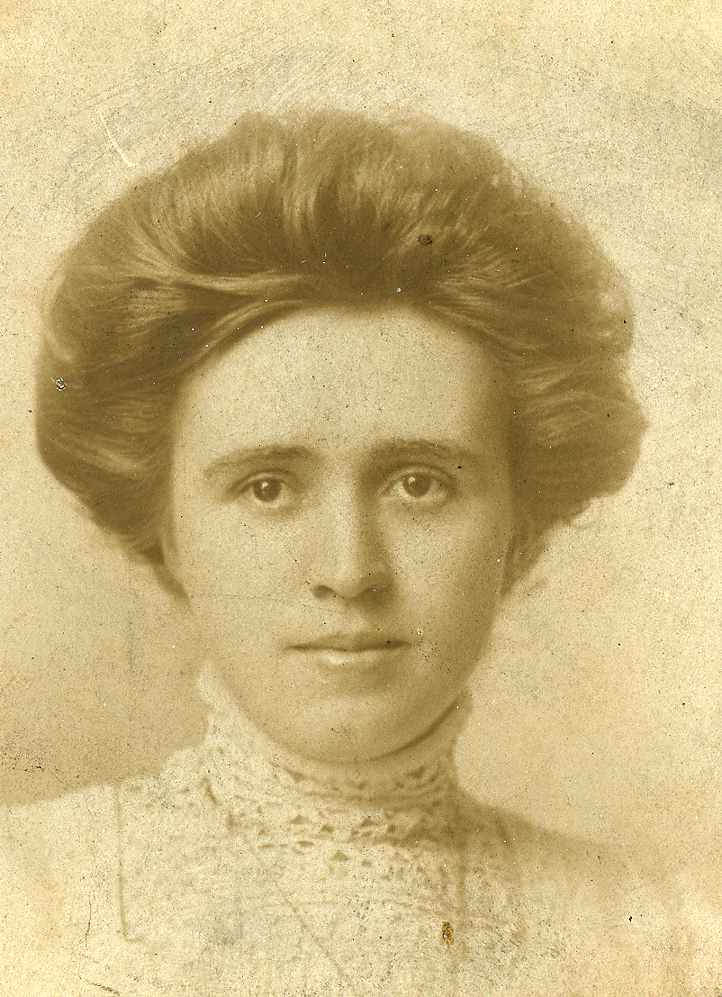
Lillian Exum Clement: First female attorney to practice law in North Carolina without male partners, and first female elected to the North Carolina General Assembly

=== Lawyers ===
- First female (act as attorney): Ann Marwood Durant in 1673
- First female: Tabitha Ann Holton (1878)
- First female (practice law without male partners): Lillian Exum Clement (1917)
- First African American female: Ruth Whitehead Whaley (1933)
- First Lumbee female: Betty "JoJo" Hunt (1973)

=== Law Clerk ===
- First female to clerk for the United States Court of Appeals for the Fourth Circuit in North Carolina: Doris Gray

=== State judges ===
- First female (non-attorney): Mamie Dowd Walker in 1934
- First female (superior court): Susie Sharp (1928) in 1949
- First African American female: Elreta Melton Alexander-Ralston (1947)
- First female (North Carolina Supreme Court): Susie Sharp (1928) in 1962
- First female (Chief Justice; North Carolina Supreme Court): Susie Sharp (1928) in 1975
- First female (Twenty-Second Judicial District): Kimberly S. Taylor (1977) in 1986
- First African American female (superior court): Shirley L. Fulton in 1989
- First (African American) female (Thirteenth Judicial District): Ola M. Lewis in 1993
- First female (Twenty-Fourth Judicial District): Rebecca Eggers-Gryder
- First Hispanic American (female) (judicial officer): Georgia J. Lewis
- First African American (female) (Second Judicial District): Regina Parker in 2001
- First African American (female) (North Carolina Supreme Court): Patricia Timmons-Goodson in 2006
- First female (to swear daughter into judicial office): Tanya T. Wallace in 2018
- First Iranian American (female): Sam Hamadani in 2018
- First Native American females (North Carolina District Courts): Angelica Chavis McIntyre and Brooke Locklear Clark in 2018
- First African American female (Chief Justice; North Carolina Supreme Court): Cheri Beasley in 2019
- First Native American female (Chief; North Carolina District Courts): Angelica Chavis McIntyre in 2021
- First openly lesbian female: Alyson A. Grine in 2021
- First Native American female (Superior Court of North Carolina): Jessica Locklear in 2024

=== Federal judges ===
- First African American (female) (United States Court of Appeals for the Fourth Circuit): Allyson Kay Duncan in 2003
- First female (U.S. District Court for the Middle District of North Carolina): Catherine Eagles (1982) in 2010

=== United States Attorney ===
- First female (Eastern District of North Carolina): Margaret Currin in 1988
- First African American (female) (Western District of North Carolina): Dena J. King in 2021

=== District Attorneys ===
- First female: Jean E. Powell in 1989
- First African American female: Belinda J. Foster in 1993

=== Assistant District Attorney ===
- First African American female (Thirteenth Prosecutorial District): Wanda G. Bryant

=== Public Defender ===
- First female: Mary Ann Tally in 1974
- First female (Chief Public Defender): Regina M. Joe

=== Political Office ===
- First female (North Carolina General Assembly): Lillian Exum Clement (1917) in 1920
- First female (U.S. Senator): Elizabeth Dole (1965) from 2003 to 2009
- First openly lesbian female (North Carolina Senate from the Ninth District): Julia Boseman (1992) in 2005

=== Bar Associations ===
- First female president (North Carolina Bar Association): Rhoda Bryan Billings from 1991 to 1992
- First female president (North Carolina State Bar): M. Ann Reed from 2000 to 2001

== Firsts in local history ==
- Margaret Fonvielle Heyward (1943): First female lawyer admitted to the Bar Association in Southeastern North Carolina
- Cheryl Spencer: First African American (female) to serve as a Judge of Judicial District 3B
- Sarah Seaton: First female to serve as the Chief District Judge of the Fourth Judicial District
- Regina M. Joe: First [African American] female to serve as a Judge of the 16A Judicial District
- Beirne Minor Harding: First female District Attorney for the Twenty-Third Judicial District [Alleghany, Ashe, Wilkes and Yadkin Counties, North Carolina].
- Rebecca Eggers-Gryder: First female to serve as a Judge of the Twenty-Fourth Judicial District in North Carolina [Avery, Madison, Mitchell, Watauga and Yancey Counties, North Carolina]
- Regina Parker: First African American (female) to serve as the Chief Judge of the Second Judicial District (2018) [Beaufort, Hyde, Martin, Tyrrell and Washington Counties, North Carolina]
- Belinda J. Foster: First African American female to serve as the District Attorney of Caswell and Rockingham Counties, North Carolina (1993)
- Alyson A. Grine: First openly LGBT female to serve as a Judge of the Judicial District 15B (2021) [Chatham and Orange Counties, North Carolina]
- Ashley Welch: First female District Attorney for the Thirtieth Judicial District in North Carolina (2014) [Cherokee, Clay, Graham, Haywood, Jackson, Macon, and Swain Counties, North Carolina]
- Jean E. Powell: First female to serve as the District Attorney for Hoke and Scotland Counties, North Carolina (1989)
- Kathryn Overby: First female judge in Alamance County, North Carolina
- Anna Hyder Baucom: First female magistrate in Anson County, North Carolina
- Tami Mancos: First female magistrate in Bladen County, North Carolina (2000)
- Tamika Jenkins (2006): First African American female lawyer in Leland, North Carolina [Brunswick County, North Carolina]
- Lillian Exum Clement: First female lawyer in Buncombe County, North Carolina
- Pauline Harrison: First female magistrate in Buncombe County, North Carolina
- Jacqueline Grant: First African American female to serve as a resident Superior Court judge in Buncombe County, North Carolina (2021). She was the first African American female to serve as the President of the Buncombe Judicial Bar (2014-2015).
- Juanita Boger-Allen: First African American female district judge in Cabarrus County, North Carolina (2019)
- Mary Ann Harper: First female magistrate in Craven County, North Carolina
- Beth Keever: First female judge in Cumberland County, North Carolina
- Mary Ann Tally: First female to serve as the Public Defender for Cumberland County, North Carolina (1974)
- Rosalind Baker: First African American (female) judge in Davidson County, North Carolina (2021)
- Karen Bethea-Shields: First female (African American) judge in Durham County, North Carolina
- Kimberly Martin Rehberg: First African American male to serve as the Durham City Attorney (2019) [Durham, Wake, Orange Counties, North Carolina]
- Margaret Dudley: First African American female to serve as the Deputy County Attorney in Guilford County, North Carolina
- Avery Crump: First female (and African American female) to serve as the District Attorney for Guilford County, North Carolina (2019)
- Teresa Vincent: First African American (female) to serve as the Chief Judge of the Guilford County District Court, North Carolina (2019)
- Addie Rawls: First African American (female) to serve as the Assistant District Attorney for the Eleventh Prosecutorial District (1991) and judge for the Eleventh Judicial District (2002) [Harnett, Johnston and Lee Counties, North Carolina]
- Carolyn Burnette Ingram: First woman to practice law in Henderson County, North Carolina
- Chelsea Forbes: First African American female to serve as the Assistant District Attorney for District 29-B (2014; Henderson County, North Carolina)
- Imelda Pate: First female to serve as a superior court judge in Lenoir County, North Carolina
- Regina Ann Moore (1973): First female lawyer in Martin County, North Carolina
- Julia Alexander: First female lawyer in Charlotte, North Carolina [Mecklenburg County, North Carolina]
- Kathy Thompson: First female to serve as the President of the Mecklenburg County Bar Association, North Carolina
- Nell Lott: First African American female (and African American in general) to serve as the President of the Mecklenburg County Bar Association, North Carolina
- Wendy Hazelton: First African American (female) judge in Pitts County, North Carolina
- Erica Standfield Brandon: First African American female (and African American in general) judge in Rockingham County, North Carolina (2019)
- Frances Holder: First female magistrate in Rowan County, North Carolina (1970)
- Brandy Cook: First female District Attorney for Rowan County, North Carolina (2010)
- Lorrin Freeman: First female District Attorney for Wake County, North Carolina (2014)
- Rebecca Eggers-Gryder: First female president of the Watauga County Bar Association
- Mary Louise Canter: First female (non-attorney) magistrate in Wilkes County, North Carolina (1988)
- Erica James: First African-American female judge in the 8th Judicial District, Lenoir County, Greene County, and Wayne County (2012).
- Carol A. Jones: First African-American female judge in the 4th Judicial District of Duplin, Jones, Onslow, and Jones Counties. (2000-2020).

== See also ==
- List of first women lawyers and judges in the United States
- Timeline of women lawyers in the United States
- Women in law

== Other topics of interest ==
- List of first minority male lawyers and judges in the United States
- List of first minority male lawyers and judges in North Carolina
