= List of first women lawyers and judges in U.S. territories =

This is a list of the first women lawyer(s) and judge(s) in the territories of the U.S. It includes the year in which the women were admitted to practice law (in parentheses). Also included are women who achieved other distinctions such becoming the first in their state to graduate from law school or become a political figure.

== American Samoa ==
- Barbara A. Sena Waite (c. 1970s): First female lawyer in American Samoa. She was also the first female to serve as the Public Defender for American Samoa (c. 1972-1974).
- Mere Tuiasosopo Betham: First female judge (native-born) in American Samoa (upon her appointment as an Associate Judge of the High Court of American Samoa in 1991)
- Mitzie Jessop Taase: First female to serve as the Attorney General of American Samoa (2020)
- Barbara A. Sena Waite (c. 1970s): First female to serve as the President of the American Samoa Bar Association

== Guam ==
- Janet Healy Weeks (c. 1970s): First female lawyer appointed to the Guam Bar. She was also the first female judge in Guam.
- Elizabeth Barrett-Anderson (c. 1979): First Chamorro female lawyer in Guam. She was also the female appointed as the Attorney General of Guam (1987-1994; Later elected 2015-2019).
- Ellen A. Lockwood: First female to serve as the Assistant U.S. Attorney for Guam (1987)
- Frances Marie Tydingco-Gatewood (1983): First Chamorro female to serve as a judge in Guam (1994) and Chief Judge of the District Court of Guam (2006). She was also the first Chamorro Pohnpeian female appointed as the Assistant Attorney General in the Prosecution Division on Guam (1984).
- Janet Healy Weeks (c. 1970s) and Monessa G. Lujan: First females to serve as Justices of the Supreme Court of Guam (1996)
- Alicia Limtiaco: First female elected as the Attorney General of Guam (2006)
- Alicia Limtiaco: First female to serve as the U.S. Attorney for Guam (c. 2010-2017)
- Katherine Maraman: First female to serve as the Chief Justice of the Supreme Court of Guam (2017)
- Jacqueline Taitano-Terlaje: First Chamorro female to serve as the President of the Guam Bar Association (2017)
- Leilani V. Lujan: First female to serve as the Federal Public Defender for the Districts of Guam and the Northern Mariana Islands (2023)

== Northern Mariana Islands ==
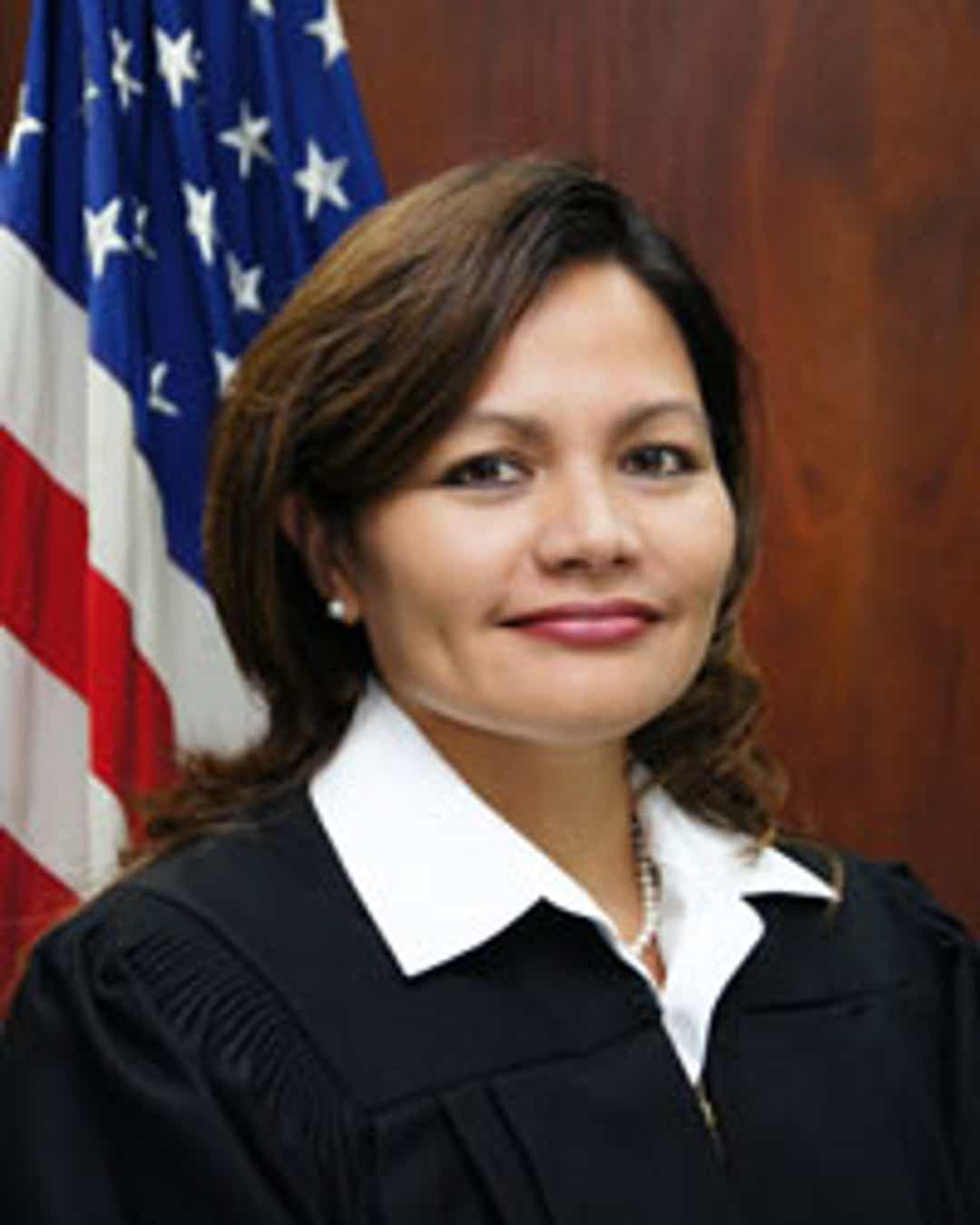
Ramona Villagomez Manglona: First female judge of the District Court for the Northern Mariana Islands (2011)

- Deanne C. Siemer (Bar No. F0116): First female lawyer in the Northern Mariana Islands (c. 1984)
- Virginia Sablan-Onerheim: First indigenous female lawyer in the Northern Mariana Islands (1995). She was also the first female appointed as a Judge of the Northern Mariana Islands Superior Court (1997).
- Ramona Villagomez Manglona: First indigenous female lawyer to pass the CNMI bar exam (1996). In 2002, she became the first female confirmed to serve as the Attorney General of the Northern Mariana Islands (2002). She was also the first female appointed as a Judge of the District Court for the Northern Mariana Islands (2011).
- Pamela Brown: First (female) Federal Ombudsman for the Northern Mariana Islands (1999)
- Ellsbeth Viola Alepuyo (Bar No. F0316): First Carolinian female admitted to the CNMI Bar Association (2005)
- Alicia Limtiaco: First female to serve as the U.S. Attorney for the Northern Mariana Islands (c. 2010-2017)
- Leilani V. Lujan: First female to serve as the Federal Public Defender for the Districts of Guam and the Northern Mariana Islands (2023)

=== First in a particular region in the Northern Mariana Islands ===
- Lucia Blanco-Maratita: First female lawyer in Tinian, Northern Mariana Islands

== Puerto Rico ==
- Herminia Tormes García (1917): First female lawyer and judge (1929) in Puerto Rico.
- Nilita Vientós Gaston (1926): First female lawyer to work for the Department of Justice in Puerto Rico.
- Judith Seda Matos: First female Justice of the Peace in Puerto Rico (1936-1941).
- Miriam Naveira: First female to serve as the Solicitor General of Puerto Rico (1973). She was also the first female appointed as a Justice of the Supreme Court of Puerto Rico (1985) and its Chief Justice (2003).
- Carmen Consuelo Cerezo (1969): First Puerto Rican female appointed as a Judge of the U.S. District Court for the District of Puerto Rico (1980). She is the first female federal judge in Puerto Rico.
- Aida Delgado-Colón (1980): First female appointed as an Assistant Federal Public Defender for the District of Puerto Rico (1982). She later served as the Chief Judge of the U.S. District Court for the District of Puerto Rico (2011).
- Carmen Rita Velez Borras: First female to serve as the Secretary of Justice of Puerto Rico (1983).
- Nora L. Rodríguez Matías: First female to serve as the President of the Bar Association of Puerto Rico (1988).
- Rosa Emilia Rodríguez: First female to serve as the U.S. Attorney for Puerto Rico (2007).
- Vivian I. Neptune Rivera: First female and Afro-Puerto Rican to serve as Dean of a Puerto Rican law school (upon becoming the Dean of University of Puerto Rico School of Law c. 2012).
- Ana Irma Rivera Lassén: First openly LGBT and Afro-Puerto Rican female to serve as the President of the Bar Association of Puerto Rico (2012–2014).
- Maite Oronoz Rodríguez (2001): First openly LGBT female justice appointed as the Chief Justice of the Supreme Court of Puerto Rico (2016).
- Gina R. Méndez Miró: First openly LGBT female to serve as a Judge of the United States District Court for the District of Puerto Rico (2023).
- Silvia C. Torres Ortiz: First openly transgender female lawyer in Puerto Rico and first of any U.S. Territory (2026).

=== Firsts in a particular region in Puerto Rico ===
- Isabel Llompart Zeno: First female appointed as an Administrative Judge in San Juan, Puerto Rico (2007)

== United States Virgin Islands ==
- Clarice Bryan and Edith Bornn (1948): First female lawyers respectively in the United States Virgin Islands
- Eileen Ramona Petersen: First female judge in the United States Virgin Islands (1971)
- Adriane J. Dudley: First female to serve as the President of the Virgin Islands Bar Association (1980)
- J'Ada Finch-Sheen: First female (a lawyer) to serve as the Attorney General of the United States Virgin Islands (1981-1984)
- Maria M. Cabret: First female of Puerto Rican descent to serve as a Judge of the Territorial Court of the Virgin Islands (1987), Presiding Judge of the Territorial Court (2000-2006), and Supreme Court of the Virgin Islands (c. 2006)
- Wilma A. Lewis: First female to serve as a District Court Judge for the United States Virgin Islands (2011)
- Glenda L. Lake: First female to serve as the Clerk of Court for the District of the Virgin Islands (2012)

=== Firsts in a particular region in the United States Virgin Islands ===
==== St. Thomas ====
- Soraya Diase Coffelt (1981): First female (and Hispanic American female) from St. Thomas to serve as a Judge of the United States Virgin Islands Superior Court

== See also ==
- List of first women lawyers and judges in the United States
- Timeline of women lawyers in the United States
- Women in law

== Other topics of interest ==
- List of first minority male lawyers and judges in the United States
- List of first minority male lawyers and judges in U.S. territories
