= List of first minority male lawyers and judges in U.S. territories =

This is a list of the first minority male lawyer(s) and judge(s) in the territories of the U.S. It includes the year in which the men were admitted to practice law (in parentheses). Also included are other distinctions such as the first minority men in their state to graduate from law school or become a political figure.

== American Samoa ==
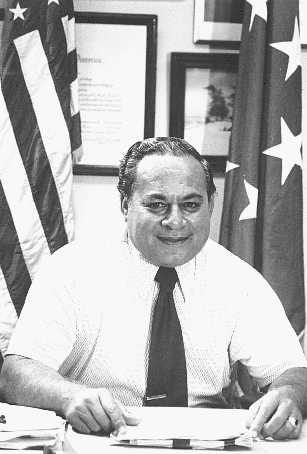
Peter Tali Coleman: First Samoan male lawyer in American Samoa (1951).

- Peter Tali Coleman (1951): First Samoan male lawyer in American Samoa. In 1955, he became the first Samoan male to serve as the Attorney General of American Samoa (1955). He became the first Samoan male to serve as Governor of American Samoa in 1989.
- Michael Kruse (1972): First Samoan male to be appointed as a justice of the High Court of American Samoa (1987)

== Guam ==
- Joaquín Cruz Pérez: First Guamanian male to serve as the justice of the peace in Guam (1899). In 1915, he became the first Guamanian male to serve as an Associate Justice in an earlier Supreme Court of Guam.
- Pancracio Palting: First Filipino male judge in Guam before the court system was later reorganized (c. 1920s)
- Vicente C. Reyes: First male island attorney (or attorney general) in Guam. He would later be appointed as a judge in 1947 before the court system was reorganized.
- Joaquin Perez: First Chamorro male appointed as the presiding judge of the Superior Court of Guam (1974)
- Benjamin Cruz (1975): First openly LGBT male appointed as an associate justice of the Supreme Court of Guam (1997)
- Douglas Moylan: First Guamanian male lawyer to be appointed as the Attorney General of Guam (2003–2007)

== Northern Mariana Islands ==
- Edward Pangelinan: First Chamorro male lawyer in the Northern Mariana Islands
- Alfred Laureta: First Filipino American appointed as a judge of the U.S. District Court for the Northern Mariana Islands (1978)
- Edward Manibusan: First Chamorro male lawyer to be elected as the attorney general of the Northern Mariana Islands (2015). He also served as a judge during the course of his career.

== Puerto Rico ==
- Benito Díaz Pares (1841): First native-born lawyer in Puerto Rico
- Clemente Ruiz Nazario (1921): First Puerto Rican male appointed as a judge of the U.S. District Court for the District of Puerto Rico (1952)
- Victor Pares-Coliazo: First blind male judge in Puerto Rico (c. 1952)
- Juan R. Torruella (1957): First Puerto Rican male appointed as a judge of the U.S. Court of Appeals for the First Circuit (1984) and to serve as its chief judge (1994)

== United States Virgin Islands ==
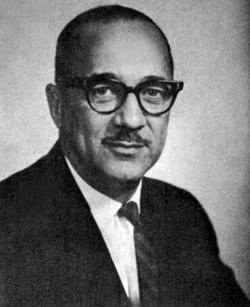
William H. Hastie: First African American male judge of the District Court of the Virgin Islands (1937).

- William H. Hastie (1931): First African American male appointed as a judge of the U.S. District Court of the Virgin Islands (1937)

== See also ==
- List of first minority male lawyers and judges in the United States

== Other topics of interest ==
- List of first women lawyers and judges in the United States
- List of first women lawyers and judges in U.S. territories
