= Elon University School of Law =

Law school in Elon, North Carolina, US

Coordinates: 36.0738°N 79.7917°W

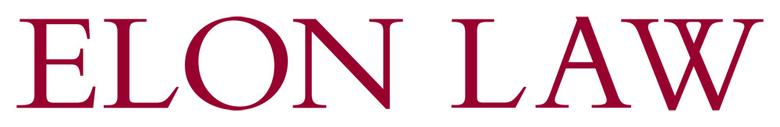
- Established: 2006
- School type: Private
- Dean: Zak Kramer
- Location: Greensboro, North Carolina, United States
- Enrollment: 445
- USNWR ranking: 148th (tie) (2024)
- Bar pass rate: 82% (February 2021 first-time takers in North Carolina)
- Website: law.elon.edu

Elon University School of Law is an American law school located in Greensboro, North Carolina, occupying the former downtown public library building. Established in 2006, Elon Law is one of nine graduate programs offered by Elon University. It earned full accreditation from the American Bar Association in 2011 and has announced plans to introduce a part-time program for working professionals in Charlotte, North Carolina, beginning in Fall 2024.

== History ==
In October 2004 Elon University trustees voted to start a law school in the former Greensboro Central Public Library at West Friendly Avenue and North Greene Street. Former Greensboro mayor and Joseph M. Bryan Foundation president Jim Melvin led the effort to raise $10 million over a period of eight months. The Bryan Foundation bought the building from the city and planned to lease it to the school for $1 a year, with the school owning the building after ten years. Leary Davis became the first dean of the law school, having served as the first dean of Campbell University's Norman Adrian Wiggins School of Law.

In spring 2005, renovation work began on the 84,000-square-foot $6 million facility, with plans for a $2.5 million library, a courtroom, and study areas. The first students were expected in fall 2006. On June 29, 2006, donors, trustees and faculty toured the H. Michael Weaver Building. The ceremony included unveiling of a portrait of Weaver, chairman of Weaver Investment Company and the Weaver Foundation.

W.S. Supreme Court Justice Sandra Day O'Connor dedicated the new law school September 19, 2006. 115 students were enrolled.

The American Bar Association granted provisional accreditation in 2008 to Elon Law School. Full accreditation followed in 2011.

Also in 2008, Leary announced he would no longer be dean due to health problems, but he intended to remain as a professor. George R. Johnson Jr. replaced him after serving as interim dean.

In 2011, Elon announced plans for buying land in Greensboro to expand the law school, which had 132 students.

Starting in fall 2015, Elon students attended for two and a half years rather than the usual three, using a trimester schedule. Elon was believed to be the first law school in the United States to do this. Also, Elon began a joint program with Guilford College. Another program introduced in March 2016 allows students to attend N.C. A&T for three years and Elon for two and a half years. Both programs would give students a Bachelor's degree from the other school and a law degree from Elon.

== Academic programs and clinics ==
=== 2.5 year program ===
In December 2017, Elon Law graduated its first class to complete a seven-trimester, 2.5-year program that requires each student to work during part of his or her second year in a full-time legal residency-in-practice with a law firm, judge, government agency, corporation or nonprofit.

=== Elon Law Flex Program ===
Elon University announced on September 19, 2023, plans to expand Elon Law's presence into Charlotte, North Carolina, through a part-time offering for working professionals. The Elon Law Flex Program will begin in Fall 2024. It received programmatic approval in December 2023 from the American Bar Association, and the Southern Association of Colleges and Schools Commission on College approved Elon University's campus location in January 2024.

=== Dual-degree programs ===
Elon Law students can apply after their first year to one of two dual-degree programs offered at the school: a JD/MBA program with Elon University's Martha and Spencer Love School of Business, or a JD/Master of Environmental Law & Policy in coordination with Vermont Law School. In the JD/MBA program, students take courses at both the law school’s downtown Greensboro campus and at the Ernest A. Koury Sr. Business Center located on Elon University's main campus in Elon, N.C. Completing the requirements of both programs can be accomplished in as little as three years.

In the JD/MELP program, students complete courses at Elon Law and live in Vermont during their second summer to work in Vermont Law's Environmental and Natural Resources Law Clinic. Those in the program typically complete requirements for both degrees in 2.5-years.

=== Elon Law Leadership Fellows ===
Elon Law's competitive Leadership Fellows program recruits students who demonstrate exceptional leadership in all aspects of life, in addition to academic excellence. Candidates for the Leadership Fellows program complete a separate application during the admissions process, though a limited number of enrolled students are accepted into the program following their first year. Leadership Fellows complete summer externships that allows them the opportunity to serve within the public sector while also earning course credit. Fellows are required to maintain a minimum cumulative GPA, assist administration and faculty with leadership programming such as the Distinguished Leadership Lecture Series, and complete a Capstone project.

=== Elon Law Business Fellows ===
Elon Law's Business Fellows take part in a summer externship in a corporate or business setting, such as an in-house legal department; receive a stipend covering the tuition cost and living expenses for the summer corporate or business externship, as well as a Business Fellows Scholarship toward tuition during the academic year; and an opportunity to counsel businesses through the law school's Small Business & Entrepreneurship Clinic. Students meet professionals within the fields of business and business law at regional and national levels.

=== Clinical law center and the Humanitarian Immigration Law Clinic ===
Elon Law opened its Clinical Law Center in 2009 to support legal services provided by law school students. The center provides a facility for students, under the supervision of law faculty and attorneys, to work with clients referred by nonprofit organizations and government agencies in the greater-Greensboro region. The center currently houses the law school's Humanitarian Immigration Law Clinic, which has provided assistance to hundreds of refugees and clients seeking asylum or family reunification since opening in 2010.

=== North Carolina Business Court ===
The Elon University School of Law houses the North Carolina Business Court. The court hears cases involving complex commercial and corporate law disputes in the law school's Robert E. Long Courtroom. The courtroom includes three large flat screen monitors to display motions, briefs and other documents, wireless technology and videoconferencing capabilities. All Business Court cases are assigned by the Chief Justice of the North Carolina Supreme Court. Judge Julianna Theall Earp presides over cases heard in Greensboro, and the court also has judges and holds hearings in Raleigh, North Carolina, and Charlotte, North Carolina.

== Leadership ==
Elon Law is led by Dean and Professor of Law Zak Kramer. He was preceded by Interim Dean Alan Woodlief, Dean Emeritus and Professor Luke Bierman, Dean Emeritus George R. Johnson, Jr., and Founding Dean Leary Davis.

== Admissions and rankings ==
For the 2021 entering class the 50th Percentile LSAT score was 152 and GPA was 3.31.

U.S. News & World Report ranked Elon Law #133 in its 2023-2024 ranking of the best US law schools.

Elon Law was ranked #5 with a grade of A+ in preLaw Magazine's 2023 annual guide to "Best Schools for Practical Training."

== Employment and bar passage ==
82% of Elon Law graduates who took the North Carolina Bar Exam for the first time in February 2021 passed, vs. a total pass rate in North Carolina of 80%.

Elon Law reported that 73% of 2020 graduates had obtained full-time long-term bar passage-required employment in the ABA's most recent employment summary report. The overall employment rate for 2020 graduates was employment rate was 88%.

ABA Employment Summary for 2020 Graduates
Employment Status	Percentage
Employed - Bar Passage Required	75%
Employed - J.D. Advantage	7%
Employed - Professional Position	4%
Employed - Undeterminable	1%
Pursuing Graduate Degree	1%
Employed - Start Date Deferred	1%
Unemployed - Not Seeking	1%
Unemployed - Seeking	11%
Total of 108 Graduates

== Costs ==
The total cost of attendance (indicating the cost of tuition, fees, and living expenses) at Elon for the 2021-2022 academic year for 1L students is $83,956. The Law School Transparency estimated debt-financed cost of attendance for three years is $221,372.

== Student organizations ==
- American Civil Liberties Union
- Amnesty International
- Black Law Students Association
- Criminal Law Society
- Delta Theta Phi
- Elon Law Democrats
- Elon Law Moot Court
- Elon Law Pro Bono Board
- Elon Law Republicans
- Elon Law Review
- Elon Law Student Bar Association
- Family Law Society
- Federalist Society
- Innocence Project
- Hispanic and Latinx Law Students Association
- Intellectual Property Student Organization
- International Law Society
- Intervarsity Christian Fellowship
- Jewish Law Students Association
- Military Law Society
- OutLaw
- Phi Alpha Delta
- Public Interest Law Society
- Women's Law Association

== Notable advisory board and faculty members ==
- Rhoda Bryan Billings - Chief Justice of the Supreme Court of North Carolina (1986)
- James G. Exum - Distinguished Jurist in Residence at Elon Law; Chief Justice of the Supreme Court of North Carolina (1986–1995)
- Henry Frye - Chief Justice of the Supreme Court of North Carolina (1999–2001)
- David Gergen - Chair of the Advisory Board; Former advisor to four U.S. presidents

== Melvin photo controversy ==
In summer 2020, a portrait of former Greensboro mayor Jim Melvin, who played a major role in bringing the law school to Greensboro, was moved to a less visible area on the campus during remodeling. Students had requested the removal of the portrait because of comments Melvin made in a 2015 interview. Melvin told the News and Record he did not like the use of the term "massacre" for the 1979 Greensboro massacre. He also said that the Communist Workers' Party, in that confrontation, "picked a fight" with the Klan and Nazis, but "they never intended on getting killed." Students representing a group seeking changes intended to make the law school more inclusive found the suggestion that the Klan was provoked to be offensive. They sought removal of "any paintings and photographs of historical perpetrators of social injustice and racial inequity currently present at Elon Law." When the portrait was moved, the students indicated that they would continue efforts to have the portrait removed from campus.
