= List of first minority male lawyers and judges in North Carolina =

List of the first minority male lawyers and judges in North Carolina, United States

This is a list of the first minority male lawyer(s) and judge(s) in North Carolina. It includes the year in which the men were admitted to practice law (in parentheses). Also included are other distinctions such as the first minority men in their state to graduate from law school or become a political figure.

== Firsts in North Carolina's history ==
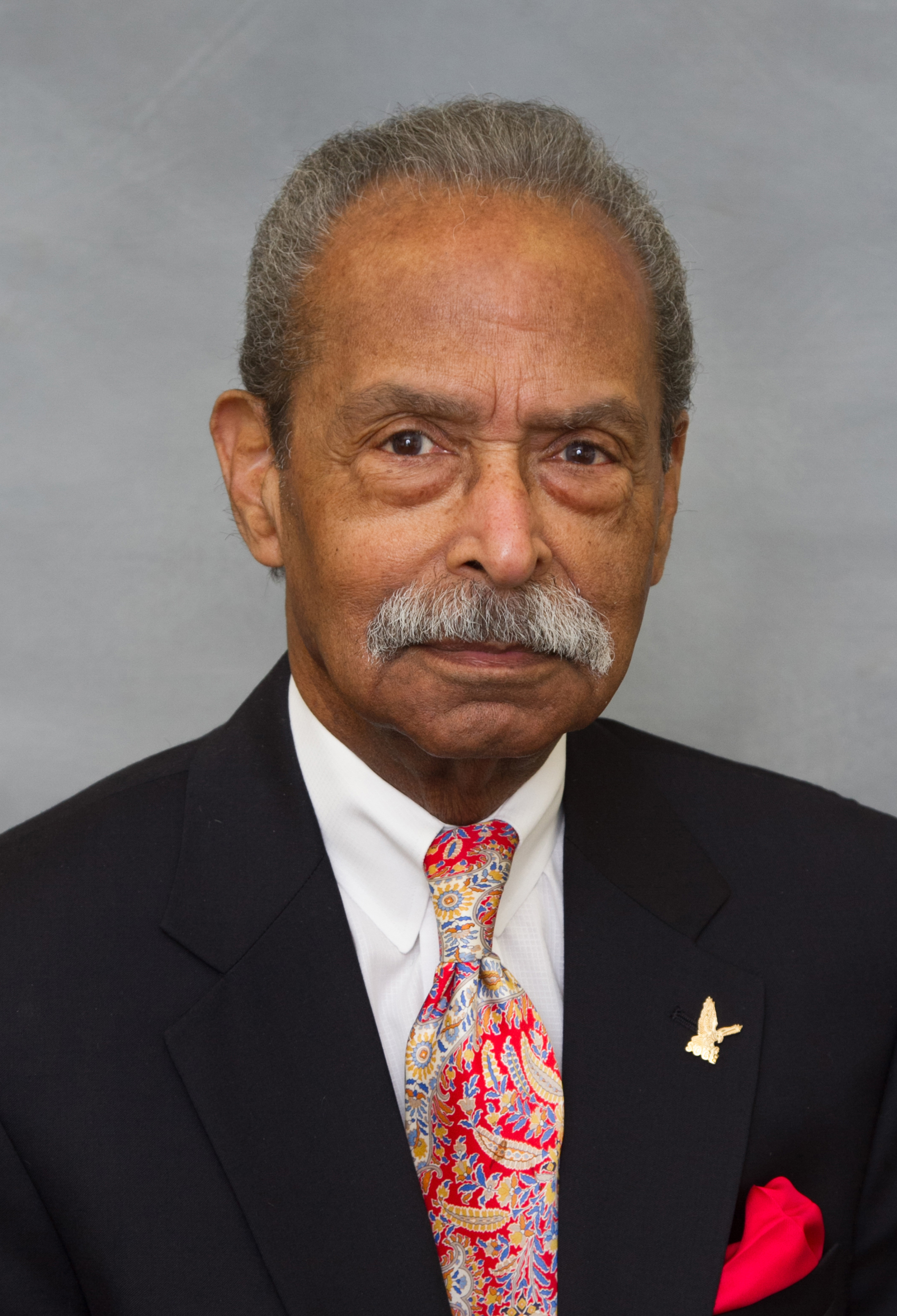
Mickey Michaux: First African American male to become a U.S. Attorney in North Carolina (1977)

=== Lawyers ===
- First African American: George Lawrence Mabson (1871)
- First Native American male: Horace Locklear (1972)
- First Hispanic American male (U.S. Army, North Carolina): Jhonathan Morales Nájera (c. 2016)

=== State judges ===
- First Jewish American male: Sol Bernard Weinstein in 1942
- First Native American males (both from the Lumbee tribe): Early Bullard and Lacy Maynor in 1954 and 1958 respectively
- First Hispanic American male (magistrate): Gaspar R. Gonzalez, Sr.
- First African American male: Sammie Chess Jr. in 1971
- First African American male (Resident Superior Court): Clifton Johnson in 1977
- First African American male (North Carolina Court of Appeals): Clifton Johnson in 1982
- First African American male (North Carolina Supreme Court): Henry Frye in 1983
- First African American male (Senior Resident; Superior Court): Cy A. Grant Sr. in 1988
- First Native American (Lumbee) male (superior court): Sandy Dexter Brooks (1976) in 1989
- First openly gay male: Ray Warren around 1998
- First African American male (North Carolina Supreme Court; Chief Justice): Henry Frye in 1999
- First Native American (Cherokee) male: Brad Letts in 2000
- First Hispanic American male: Albert Diaz (1988) in 2001
- First Sri Lankan American male (district court): Roy Wijewickrama in 2010
- First Latino American male (elected): Lou Olivera in 2012
- First openly gay male (elected): John S. Arrowood in 2017
- First Jewish American (North Carolina Supreme Court): Mark A. Davis in 2019
- First Laotian American (district court): Thai Vang in 2019
- First Yemeni American male: Rashad Ahmed Hauter in 2021

=== Federal judges ===
- First African American male (federal district court): Richard Erwin in 1980
- First Hispanic American male (U.S. Court of Appeals for the Fourth Circuit): Albert Diaz (1988) in 2010
- First African American male (U.S. Magistrate Judge; U.S. District Court for the Middle District of North Carolina): Joe Webster in 2012

=== Attorney General of North Carolina ===
- First Jewish American male: Josh Stein in 2016

=== Assistant Attorney General ===
- First African American male: Walter E. Ricks III in 1973

=== United States Attorney ===
- First African American male: Mickey Michaux (1964) in 1977

=== Assistant United States Attorneys ===
- First African American male: Henry Frye in 1963
- First Asian American male: Zeppelin Wong in 1963

=== District Attorney ===
- First African American male: Carl Fox in 1984
- First Native American male: Matt Scott in 2019

=== Assistant District Attorney ===
- First African American male: Walter Johnson, Jr. during the 1960s

=== Political Office ===
- First Jewish American male (Governor-elect): Josh Stein in 2024

=== North Carolina Bar Association ===
- First African American male president: Cressie H. Thigpen, Jr. in 2005

== Firsts in local history ==
- Carl Fox: First African American male to serve as a District Attorney for Chatham and Orange Counties, North Carolina (1984)
- Walter Whitted Hoover: First African American male to serve as a Justice of the Peace in High Point, North Carolina [Davidson, Forsyth, Guilford and Randolph Counties, North Carolina]
- Randolph Baskerville: First African American to serve as an Assistant District Attorney for the 9th Judicial Circuit in North Carolina [Franklin, Granville and Vance Counties, North Carolina]
- Moses Burt Jr. (c. 1959): First African American male lawyer in Alamance County, North Carolina
- Larry Brown Jr.: First African American male judge in Alamance County, North Carolina (2017)
- Everette Dula: First African American male magistrate in Alexander County, North Carolina (c. 1982)
- Arthur Watford, Jr.: First African American male magistrate in Bertie County, North Carolina
- Charlie G. Gore: First African American male magistrate in Bladen County, North Carolina
- Robert L. Harrell: First African American male judge in Buncombe County, North Carolina (1983)
- Jason R. Parker: First African American male lawyer in Catawba County, as well as the first African American male to serve as the Assistant District Attorney for the 25th Prosecutorial District [Cabarrus and Catawba Counties, North Carolina]. He was also the first African American male Assistant District Attorney for the 22nd Prosecutorial District (Alexander and Iredell Counties, North Carolina).
- John S. Leary (1892): First African American male lawyer in Fayetteville, North Carolina [Cumberland County, North Carolina]
- R. McCants Andrews (1921): First African American male lawyer in Durham, North Carolina [Durham County, North Carolina]
- Patrick W. Baker: First African American male to serve as the Durham City Attorney [Durham, Wake, Orange Counties, North Carolina]
- Albert L. Turner: First African American male to serve as the Dean of the North Carolina Central University School of Law (1942)
- Lowell Siler: First African American male to serve as the County Attorney of Durham County, North Carolina (2009)
- George Henry Mitchell (1900): First African American male lawyer in Greensboro, North Carolina [Guilford County, North Carolina]
- Bill Marshall: First African American male magistrate in High Point, Guilford County, North Carolina
- Ronnie Conner: First African American male magistrate in Iredell County, North Carolina
- John S. Leary (1892): First African American male lawyer in Charlotte, North Carolina [Mecklenburg County, North Carolina]
- Clifton Johnson: First African American male to serve as a District Court Judge in Mecklenburg County, North Carolina (1969)
- Spencer Merriweather: First African American male to serve as the District Attorney of Mecklenburg County, North Carolina (2019)
- Carl Fox: First African American male to serve as a District Attorney for Chatham and Orange Counties, North Carolina (1984)
- Mario Perez: First Hispanic American male judge in Pitt County, North Carolina (2018)
- Herbert Richardson, Sr.: First African American male to serve as the Assistant District Attorney (1978) and judge (1979) for Robeson County, North Carolina
- Joe Webster: First African American male lawyer in Madison, Rockingham County, North Carolina
- Albert Kirby: First African American male to serve as a Judge of Sampson County's 4A Judicial District Court
- Charles Wesley Williamson (1932): First African American male lawyer in Kittrell and Henderson, North Carolina [Vance County, North Carolina]
- Albert L. Turner: First African American male to serve as the Dean of the North Carolina Central University School of Law (1942)
- George Greene: First African American male judge in Wake County, North Carolina
- T.T. Clayton: First African American male lawyer in Warren County, North Carolina
- Nereus Deleon Smith: First African American male lawyer in Goldsboro, North Carolina [Wayne County, North Carolina]

== See also ==
- List of first minority male lawyers and judges in the United States

== Other topics of interest ==
- List of first women lawyers and judges in the United States
- List of first women lawyers and judges in North Carolina
