= Coffelt =

Coffelt is a surname. Notable people with the surname include:

- Jon Coffelt (born 1963), American artist
- Leslie Coffelt (1910–1950), American police officer
- Soraya Diase Coffelt (born 1958), United States Virgin Islands lawyer and judge
