= James G. Exum =

American judge

James G. Exum Jr.
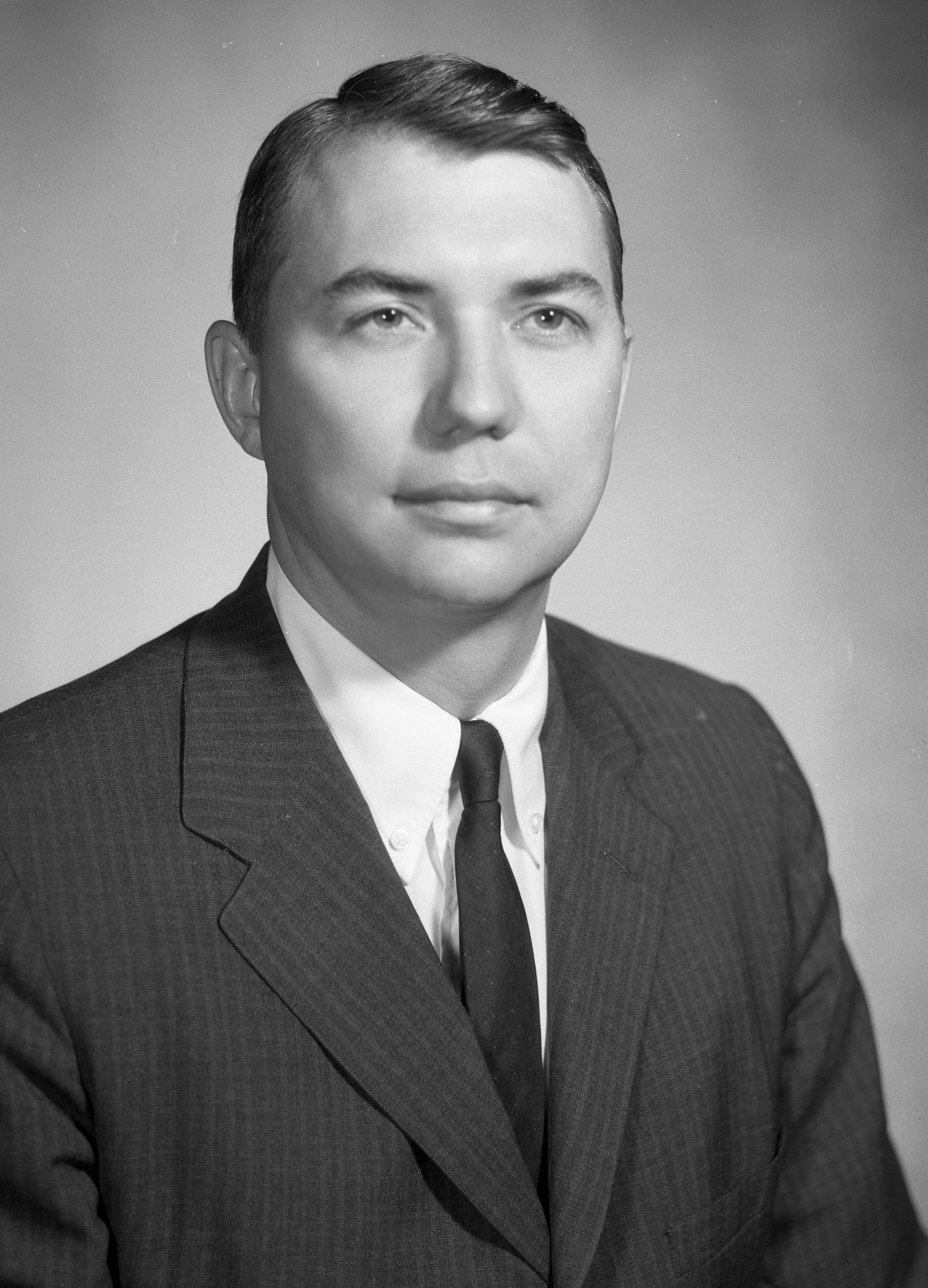
- Exum c. 1967

Chief Justice of the North Carolina Supreme Court

Member of the North Carolina House of Representatives
- In office Dec. 1986 – Jan. 1, 1995
- Preceded by: Rhoda Billings
- Succeeded by: Burley Mitchell

Associate Justice of the North Carolina Supreme Court
- In office 1974–1986

North Carolina Superior Court, 18th district
- In office July 1, 1967 - 1974

North Carolina House of Representatives, 26th district
- In office 1966

Personal details
- Born: September 14, 1935 (age 90) Greene County, North Carolina, U.S.
- Party: Democratic
- Spouse: Judith Jamison
- Children: 3
- Education: University of North Carolina at Chapel Hill (BA); New York University (LLB)
- Nickname: Jim Exum

Military service
- Branch/service: Judge Advocate General's Corps, United States Army Reserves
- Years of service: 1961–1967
- Rank: Captain

James Gooden Exum Jr. also known as Jim Exum (born September 14, 1935) is an American jurist who served on the North Carolina Supreme Court from 1975 to 1994, and as chief justice from 1986 to 1994.

Under his leadership, the court "expanded civil rights, took a new approach to criminal justice, and increased available remedies in tort law." Associate Justice Mark A. Davis has compared the Exum Court to the Warren Court at the federal level.

== Early life and education ==
Exum was born in Greene County, North Carolina. He was the son of Mary Wall (née Bost) and James Gooden Exum. In 1953, he graduated from Snow Hill High School as class valedictorian.

He attended the University of North Carolina at Chapel Hill where he was a Morehead Scholar, a member of Sigma Nu fraternity, and a member of the honor societies Phi Eta Sigma and Phi Beta Kappa. He graduated with an A.B. in English in 1957. He then attended New York University School of Law, where he was a Root Tilden Scholar. He received an LL.B. in 1960.

In 1961, he attended the U.S. Army Information School, becoming a captain in the Army Reserves and United States Army Judge Advocate General's (JAG) Corps from 1961 to 1967. In 1968, he also attended the National Judicial College.

== Career ==
From 1960 to 1961, Exum clerked for Emery B. Denny, a North Carolina Supreme Court Justice. From 1961 until 1967, he worked for the law firm Smith Moore Smith Schell & Hunter in Greensboro, North Carolina. In 1966, he served in the North Carolina House of Representatives for the 26th district.

He was appointed to the North Carolina Superior Court, 18th district, by Governor Daniel Killian More on July 1, 1967. In 1968, he was elected to the bench and continued in that capacity through 1974. He was elected as an associate justice of the North Carolina Supreme Court in 1974, serving from January 1975 to 1986.

In 1985, the governor did not follow the tradition of appointing the senior associate justice, Exum in this case, to the vacant position of chief justice. Exum resigned from the North Carolina Supreme Court to run against the governor's appointee in the next statewide election. In 1986, he was elected Chief Justice and served through January 1, 1995. When he retired from the bench, a newspaper noted that Exum was “known for, among other things, his ability to uphold a death sentence despite personal objections to capital punishment. And though he was consistently successful at the polls, he took a very visible role in urging the state to change from electing to appointing judges."

Exum was an adjunct professor of law at the University of North Carolina at Chapel Hill from 1977 to 1986 and Duke University from 1995 to 1996. In 2006, he joined the faculty of Elon University's new law school as Distinguished Jurist in Residence.

After retiring from the bar, Exum joined the firm of Smith Moore, LLP in Greensboro, NC, later called Smith Moore Leatherwood LLP, where he led the appellate practice group. In November 2018, the firm merged with Fox Rothschild, a national law firm. Exum is currently a retired counsel from that firm. His status with the North Carolina Bar is Emeritus Pro Bono.

== Publications ==
- "Rediscovering State Constitutions." North Carolina Law Review, 70:6 (1992).

== Professional affiliations ==
Exum is a member of the North Carolina Bar Association, serving on the task force on alternative to litigation, the committee on judicial independence, and the appellate rules study commission. He is a member of the American Bar Association where he served on the house of delegates, as chairman of the criminal justice standards committee, and chairman of the ad hoc committee on death penalty costs. From 1995 to 2003, he was a fellow and state chair for the American Bar Association Foundation. He is also a fellow in the American Academy of Appellate Lawyers.

He was a board member of the Conference on Chief Justices, chair of the Standing Committee on Criminal Justice Standards, and a member of the Judicial Conference of the United States, the International Society of Barristers, and the Gilford Inn of Court. He was also a member of the Fair Trial Initiative, Court Watch, and the legal honor society Phi Delta Phi.

== Awards and honors ==
- His portrait was dedicated at the North Carolina Supreme Court, in October 2015
- John McNeill Smith Jr., Award, North Carolina Bar Association's Constitutional Rights and Responsibilities Section, 2009
- Judge John J. Parker Award, North Carolina Bar Association
- Alumni Achievement Award, New York University School of Law
- Herbert Harley Award, American Judicature Society
- James Iredell Award, Phi Alpha Delta Law Fraternity, Campbell University Norman A. Wiggins School of Law
- Distinguished Alumnus Award, University of North Carolina at Chapel Hill
- William Richardson Davie Award, Trustees, University of North Carolina at Chapel Hill
- Distinguished Service Award, General Alumni Association, University of North Carolina at Chapel Hill
- Frank Porter Graham Award, American Civil Liberties Union of North Carolina
- Distinguished Service Award, Psi chapter, Sigma Nu fraternity,1974
- Distinguished Service Award, Greensboro Jaycees, 1968
- Benjamin F. Butler Memorial Award, New York University School of Law, 1960
- Algernon Sydney Sullivan Award, University of North Carolina at Chapel Hill, 1957

== Personal life ==
Exum married Judith Jamison on June 29, 1963. They have three children: James Gooden Exum, Steven Jamison Exum, and Mary March Exum.

He served on the Central Selection Committee for the Morehead Scholarship Foundation from 1975 to 1988. He is also a past president of the UNC General Alumni Association.

He served on the board of the Paul Green Foundation, Sustainable North Carolina, and Habitat for Humanity. He belongs to the Capital City Club in Raleigh, the Carolina Club, the Conversation Club, the Greensboro City Club, the Masons, the Milburnie Fishing Club, the Neuse Sailing Association, the Sherwood Swim & Racquet Club, the Shriners, the Wake County Chittlin' Club, and the Watauga Club.

Legal offices
Preceded by Rhoda Billings	Chief Justice, North Carolina Supreme Court; Dec. 1986-Jan. 1, 1995 (1974-95 overall, as both Associate and Chief Justice)	Succeeded by Burley Mitchell
