= Ramona Villagomez Manglona =

American judge (born 1967)

Mona Manglona
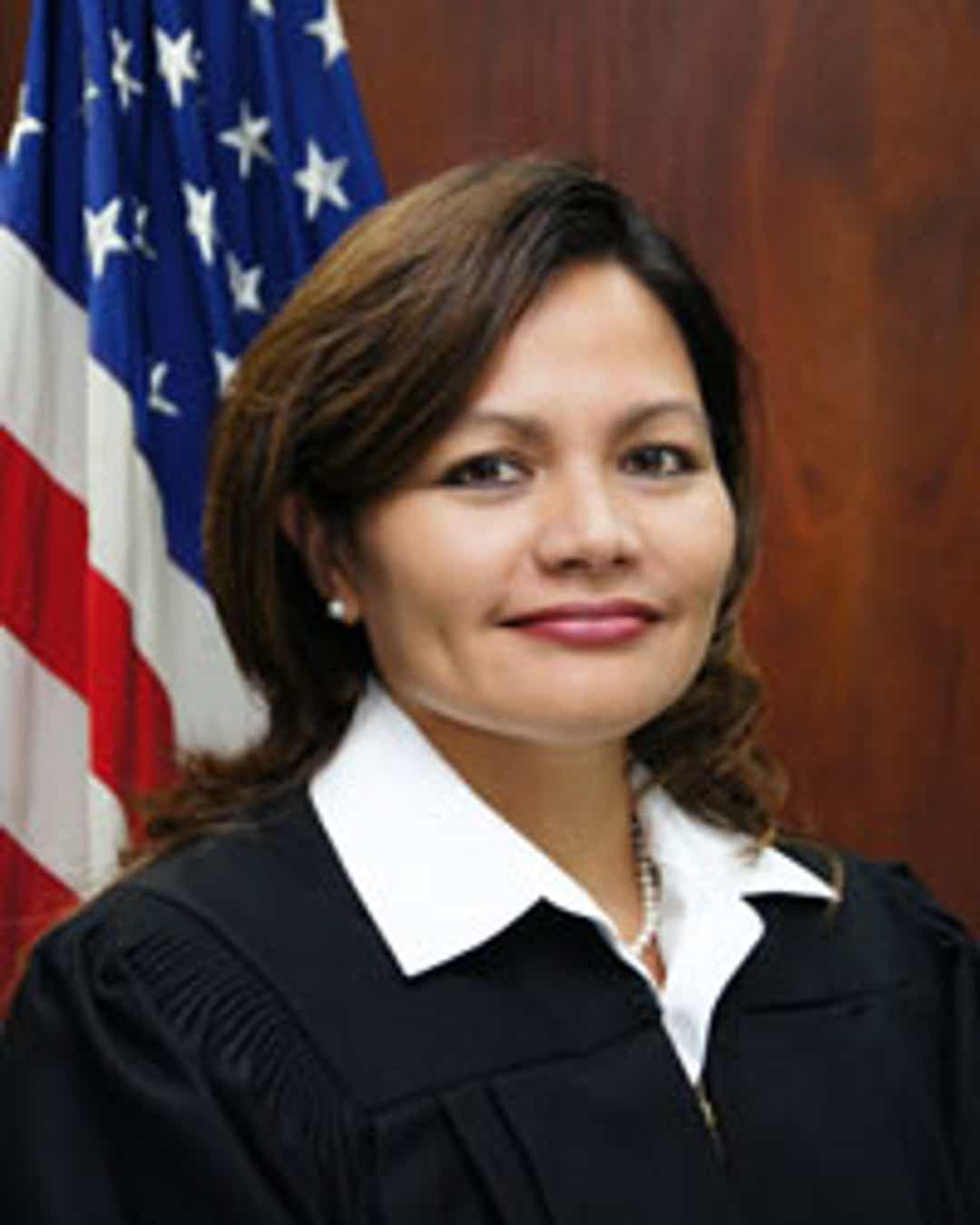
- Official portrait, 2011

Chief Judge of the District Court for the Northern Mariana Islands
- Incumbent
- Assumed office July 29, 2011
- Preceded by: Alex R. Munson

Judge of the District Court for the Northern Mariana Islands
- Incumbent
- Assumed office July 29, 2011
- Appointed by: Barack Obama; Joe Biden (reappointment)
- Preceded by: Alex R. Munson

16th Attorney General of the Northern Mariana Islands
- In office November 2002 – May 2003
- Governor: Juan Babauta
- Preceded by: Robert Torres
- Succeeded by: Clyde Lemons (acting)

Personal details
- Born: Ramona Emma Pangelinan Villagomez; 1967 (age 58–59) Saipan, Mariana Islands, Trust Territory of the Pacific Islands
- Party: Independent
- Spouse: John Manglona
- Children: 2
- Education: University of California, Berkeley (BA); University of New Mexico (JD)

Ramona Villagomez Manglona (/mɒŋˈloʊnjə/; née Ramona Emma Pangelinan Villagomez; born 1967) is a Northern Mariana Islander attorney who is currently the United States chief judge of the District Court for the Northern Mariana Islands.

== Early life and education ==
Manglona was born in 1967, on Saipan in the Commonwealth of the Northern Mariana Islands. She graduated from the University of California, Berkeley in 1990 with a Bachelor of Arts in Economics and Japanese. She received her Juris Doctor from the University of New Mexico School of Law in 1996.

== Career ==
Prior to attending law school, Manglona worked in her family's real estate management business. After graduating from law school, she served as a law clerk for two of the judges of the Superior Court of the Commonwealth of the Northern Mariana Islands. She then joined the Office of the Attorney General, serving first in the criminal division and later in the civil division. She became Deputy Attorney General of the Northern Mariana Islands early in 2002 and became the first female Attorney General of the Northern Mariana Islands in November 2002. She was appointed to the Superior Court by Juan Babauta in May 2003 (succeeding Roberto Camacho Naraja) and resigned from that post in June 2011 (succeeded by Joe Camacho) to take up her current post in the District Court. Her successor as judge, Joe Camacho, was sworn into office as a judge on November 19, 2011.

=== District court service ===
On January 26, 2011, President Barack Obama nominated Manglona to the District Court for the Northern Mariana Islands. The Senate Judiciary Committee held a hearing on her nomination on March 16, 2011, and reported her nomination favorably on April 7, 2011. On July 26, 2011, the Senate confirmed her nomination by voice vote. She received her commission on July 29, 2011, and took her oath of office on July 30, 2011. Her commission expired on July 28, 2021, at which time her term would have ended, although by rule it continued until she was either reappointed or her successor chosen and qualified.

On August 30, 2023, President Joe Biden announced his intent to reappoint Manglona as a judge of the District Court for the Northern Mariana Islands. On September 11, 2023, her nomination was sent to the Senate. On November 15, 2023, a hearing on her nomination was held before the Senate Judiciary Committee. On December 7, 2023, her nomination was reported out of committee by a 20–1 vote. On January 3, 2024, her nomination was returned to the president under Rule XXXI, Paragraph 6 of the United States Senate and she was renominated on January 8, 2024. On January 18, 2024, her nomination was reported out of committee by a 21–0 vote. On April 15, 2024, the United States Senate voted on the motion to table her nomination and it failed by a 39–50 vote. Later that day, cloture was invoked on her nomination by an 84–3 vote. On April 16, 2024, her nomination was confirmed by a 96–2 vote. She was sworn in to her second term on April 22, 2024, by Guam District Judge Frances Tydingco-Gatewood.

On June 26, 2024, Manglona heard the high-profile plea deal case of WikiLeaks founder Julian Assange. She approved the plea deal, which had been negotiated with Assange's lawyers by the U.S. Department of Justice, and sentenced Assange to prison time already served in the United Kingdom. Assange was freed immediately and left Saipan for Australia.

== Personal life ==
Manglona is married to John A. Manglona, an associate justice of the Northern Mariana Islands Supreme Court since 2000. They have two children.

== See also ==
- First women lawyers around the world
- List of first women lawyers and judges in U.S. territories

Legal offices
Preceded by Robert Torres	Attorney General of the Northern Mariana Islands; 2002–2003	Succeeded by Clyde Lemons; Acting
Preceded by Alex R. Munson	Judge of the District Court for the Northern Mariana Islands; 2011–present	Incumbent
Preceded by Alex R. Munson	Chief Judge of the District Court for the Northern Mariana Islands; 2011–present	Incumbent
