= Joseph Branch (judge) =

American judge

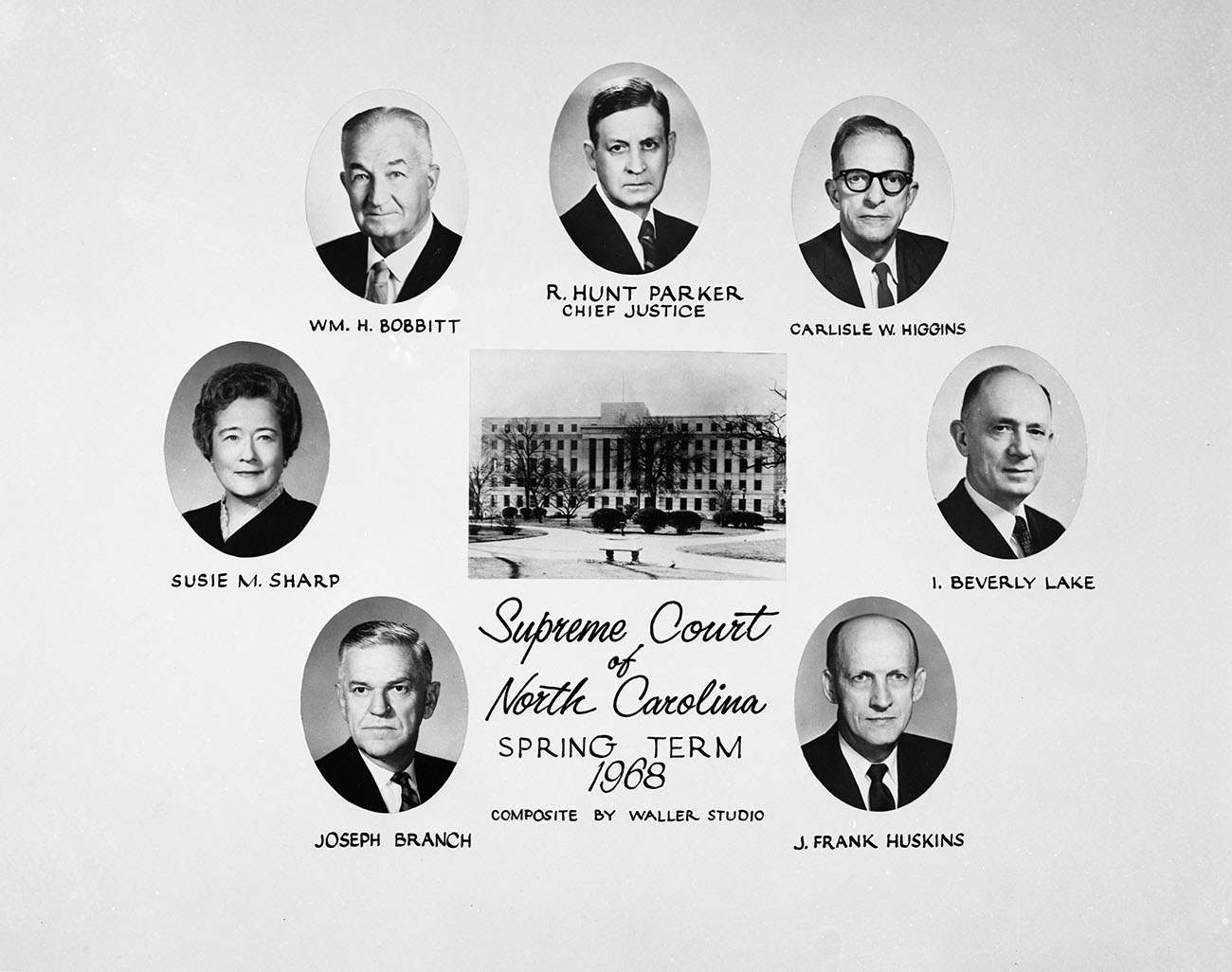
Justices of the North Carolina Supreme Court, Spring Term, 1968. Branch's portrait is at the lower left.

Joseph Branch (1915–1991) was an American jurist who served as Associate Justice (1966–1979) and then Chief Justice (1979–1986) of the North Carolina Supreme Court. He was a native of Halifax County, North Carolina. Branch was a graduate of Wake Forest University, where he also attended Wake Forest University School of Law.

Branch served in the state House of Representatives from 1947 through 1953. He was a close advisor to Governor Luther Hodges in the 1950s and managed the successful 1964 campaign of Governor Daniel K. Moore. Moore appointed Branch to fill a Supreme Court vacancy in 1966. Branch was then elected by the voters in 1966, 1968, and 1976. Governor Jim Hunt appointed Branch to replace Susie Sharp as chief justice in 1979.

Legal offices
| Preceded by Susie Sharp | Chief Justice of the North Carolina Supreme Court; 1979–1986 | Succeeded by Rhoda Billings |
