= Alex R. Munson =

American judge (1941–2025)

Alex Munson
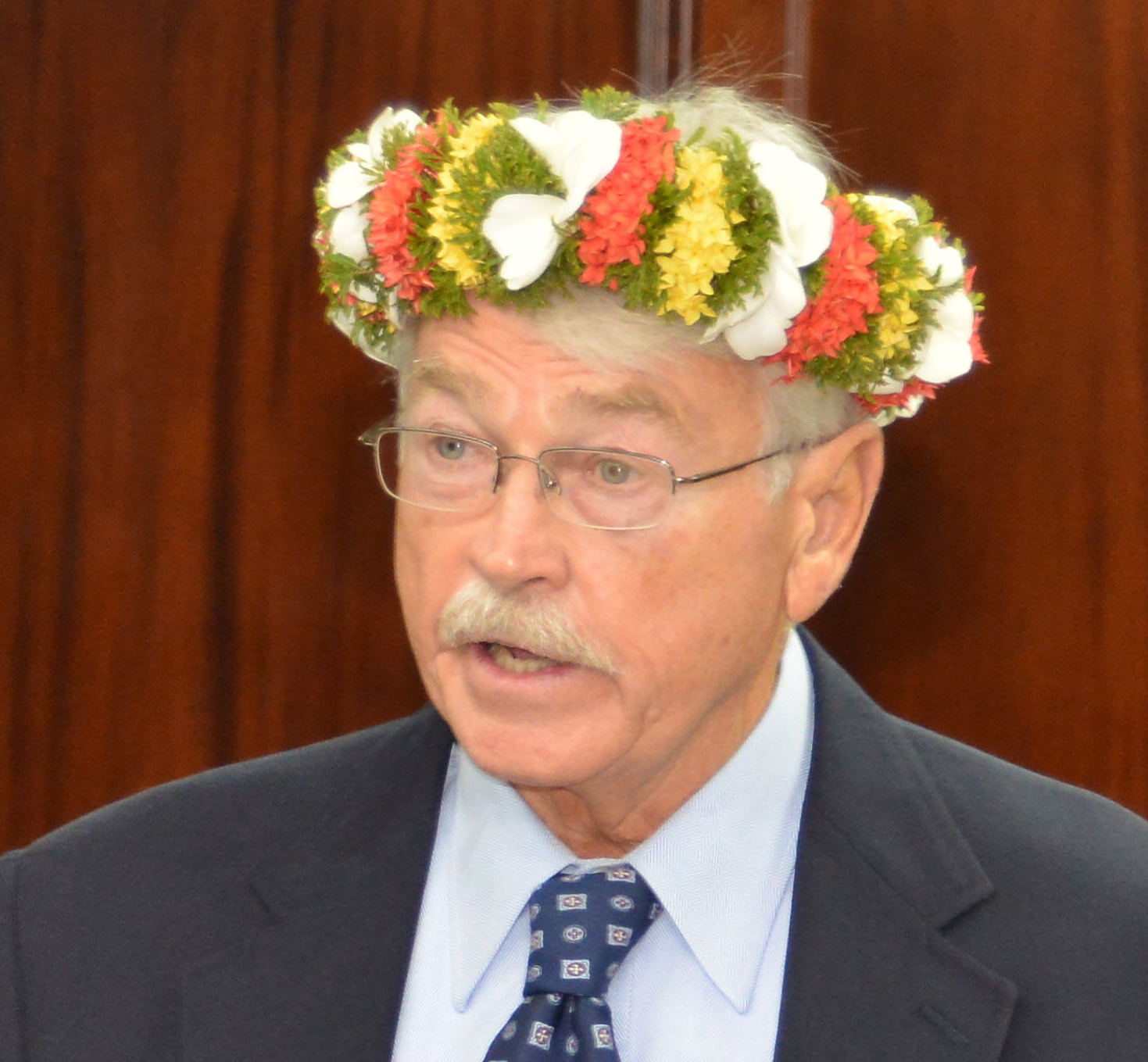
- Munson in 2012

Senior Judge of the District Court for the Northern Mariana Islands
- In office February 28, 2010 – December 5, 2025

Chief Judge of the District Court for the Northern Mariana Islands
- In office November 18, 1988 – February 28, 2010
- Preceded by: Alfred Laureta
- Succeeded by: Ramona Manglona

Judge of the District Court for the Northern Mariana Islands
- In office November 18, 1988 – February 28, 2010
- Appointed by: Ronald Reagan; Bill Clinton (reappointment)
- Preceded by: Alfred Laureta
- Succeeded by: Ramona Manglona

Personal details
- Born: Alex Robert Munson; September 25, 1941 South Gate, California, U.S.
- Died: December 5, 2025 (aged 84) Sandpoint, Idaho, U.S.
- Education: California State University, Long Beach (BA, MA); University of Southern California (EdD); Loyola Marymount University (JD)

Alex Robert Munson (September 25, 1941 – December 5, 2025) was an American jurist. He was sworn in as chief judge of the District Court for the Northern Mariana Islands on November 18, 1988, and he took senior status effective February 28, 2010. Prior to assuming his position on the District Court for the Northern Mariana Islands, in 1981 he was appointed the Chief Justice of the High Court of the Trust Territory of the Pacific Islands, and in 1989 became a designated judge for the District Court of Guam.

== Life and career ==
Alex Robert Munson was born September 25, 1941, in South Gate, California. He received his undergraduate degree in 1964 and an M.A. in 1965 from Long Beach State College, an Ed.D. degree in 1970 from the University of Southern California, and a J.D. degree from Loyola University School of Law in 1975. Prior to and immediately following law school, Munson served as a teacher with the Anglewood Unified School District. From 1977 to 1978, Munson was an associate with the law firm of Robert S. Talbert & Associates; from 1978 to 1982, he was an associate with the firm of Kirtland & Packard; and from 1982 to 1988, he was Chief Justice of the High Court of the Trust Territory of the Pacific Islands, which was under the jurisdiction of the U.S. Department of the Interior, until that entity ceased to exist.

Munson died in Sandpoint, Idaho, on December 5, 2025, at the age of 84.

Legal offices
Preceded by Alfred Laureta	Judge of the District Court for the Northern Mariana Islands; 1988–2010	Succeeded by Ramona Manglona
Preceded by Alfred Laureta	Chief Judge of the District Court for the Northern Mariana Islands; 1988–2010	Succeeded by Ramona Manglona
