= Janet Healy Weeks =

American lawyer and judge (1932–2026)

Janet Healy Weeks (October 19, 1932 – May 6, 2026) was an American lawyer and judge. She was the first woman to be admitted to the bar in Guam and the first female judge in Micronesia.

== Life and career ==
Weeks was born in Quincy, Massachusetts, and studied chemistry at Emmanuel College, Boston, graduating in 1955. She went on to study law at Boston College Law School, graduating in 1958. She was then selected for the Attorney General's Honor Graduate Program, and from 1958 to 1961 she worked at the Justice Department in Washington, D.C. In 1971 she took a position in a law firm in Guam, Trapp & Gayle, and four years later, became a partner.

She was a trial judge in the Superior Court of Guam from April 1975 to April 1996, when she was appointed an Associate Justice in the Supreme Court. She held this position until her retirement in April 1999. She also sat as a designated justice in the Supreme Court of the Federated States of Micronesia, the District Court of Guam and was a justice pro tem in the Supreme Court of the Republic of Palau.

In 2009, Weeks was awarded the Hustisia Award, in recognition of her contribution to the improvement of the administration of justice and of good government in Guam. Weeks also held an honorary doctorate from the University of Guam.

Weeks died on May 6, 2026, at the age of 93.

== See also ==
- List of first women lawyers and judges in Oceania
- List of first women lawyers and judges in U.S. territories
