= Ruth Whitehead Whaley =

American lawyer (1901–1977)

Ruth Whitehead Whaley (February 2, 1901 – December 23, 1977) was the third African American woman admitted to practice law in New York in 1925 and the first in North Carolina in 1933. She was the first Black woman to graduate from Fordham University School of Law, where she graduated cum laude in 1924.

== Early life ==
Whaley was born on February 2, 1901, in Goldsboro, North Carolina. Both of her parents, Charles A. Whitehead and Dora (née Cox) Whitehead, were school teachers. She was a congregant of the AME Zion Church.

Ruth C. Whitehead married Herman S. Whaley in 1920 in Goldsboro. Her husband encouraged her to study law despite the difficulties of racism. The couple had two children, Herman W. Whaley and Ruth M. (Whaley) Spearman.

== Education ==
Whaley attended Livingstone Prep School and Livingstone College in Salisbury, North Carolina, a historically Black college (HBCU) founded in 1879. She graduated in June 1919 after earning an A.B. degree. After college, she worked as a teacher at the North Carolina State School for the Deaf in Raleigh.

== Career ==
In 1925, Whaley passed the New York bar exam, becoming the third black woman to practice law in New York. She also became the first black woman to pass the bar exam in North Carolina, when she returned to Goldsboro in 1933. Jim Crow laws made it very hard for black lawyers to practice in North Carolina, even up to the mid-1900s, but with the assistance of family friend and attorney Hugh Dortch, she was able to get a license by reciprocity. The license was mostly ceremonial, as the state did not want her to actually practice law in North Carolina. She never did practice there, returning to New York after the ceremony (making Elreta Alexander-Ralston the first black woman to practice law in North Carolina over ten years later, in 1947).

Whaley built a private practice in New York, specializing in civil service law, where she represented local black government employees. She frequently argued in front of the Second Court of Appeals and won landmark cases in the area. At one point, she represented her own husband. She maintained her private practice until 1944, when she prepared to run for a city council seat.

Throughout her life, Whaley was active in Democratic party politics. She was the first Black woman candidate chosen to represent the interests of Tammany Hall in the City Council election of 1945. This made her one of the first black women across the whole U.S. to be nominated by a major political party.

Whaley was a shrewd commentator on race and gender issues of her time. In 1949, Whaley penned an essay entitled "Women Lawyers Must Balk Both Color and Sex Bias," in which she described the "penalty" of women, and especially minority women, lawyers who must outperform their male colleagues lest "the overlooked errors of a male colleague become the colossal blunders of the woman." Since the legal profession had been for centuries a "male precinct," and biases against women were still strong in the 1940s, women were frequently blamed for men's mistakes and pushed out of the field. Her essay noted the lack of opportunities for female attorneys, the pressure to perform extra community service, the requirement of near-perfect performance, and how clients would rationalize that performance as the work of one black woman who broke the norm, rather than allowing it to breach their stereotypes.Rebels in Law: Voices in History of Black Women Lawyers

Whaley held appointed positions in New York City including Director of Staff and Community Relations in the Department of Welfare and Deputy Commissioner of the Department of Housing and Buildings. From 1951 until 1973 she served as the Secretary of the New York City Board of Estimate.

Whaley was a member of Sigma Gamma Rho sorority. She served as the Vice President of the National Council of Negro Women and was the founder and former President of the Negro Business and Professional Women's Club. She also served as a member of the Fordham University Council.

A longtime resident of Harlem, she retired from the Secretary of the New York City Board of Estimate in 1973. She died on December 23, 1977, and is buried in Mount Hope Cemetery in Yonkers.

== Legacy ==
On June 8, 2000, the Family Academy, then an alternative public school in Manhattan that is now P.S. 241, named their auditorium after Whaley. The Black Law Students Association at Fordham University Law School named their annual award the Ruth Whitehead Whaley Award in 1979. She was inducted into the alumni Hall of Honor at Fordham University on October 22, 2014.

== See also ==
- List of first women lawyers and judges in North Carolina
