= Tabitha Ann Holton =

American lawyer

- Born: c. 1854; North Carolina, United States
- Died: June 14, 1886
- Occupation: Lawyer
- Parents: Quinton Holton (father); Harriet Jacobina Holland (mother)

Tabitha Ann Holton (c. 1854 – June 14, 1886) was the first woman to be licensed as a lawyer in North Carolina and in the Southern United States, in 1878.

== Life and work ==
Holton was the daughter of Quinton Holton and Harriet Jacobina Holland Holton. Her father was a radical, itinerant Methodist minister who condemned slavery.

As a young woman, Holton graduated from Greensboro Academy in 1878. At the same time, Holton independently studied the law with her brothers Samuel and A.E. A.E. trained under Albion Winegar Tourgée who was at that time a superior court judge in Greensboro. Although it is likely that Tabitha and Tourgée met, she was not considered a student of his.

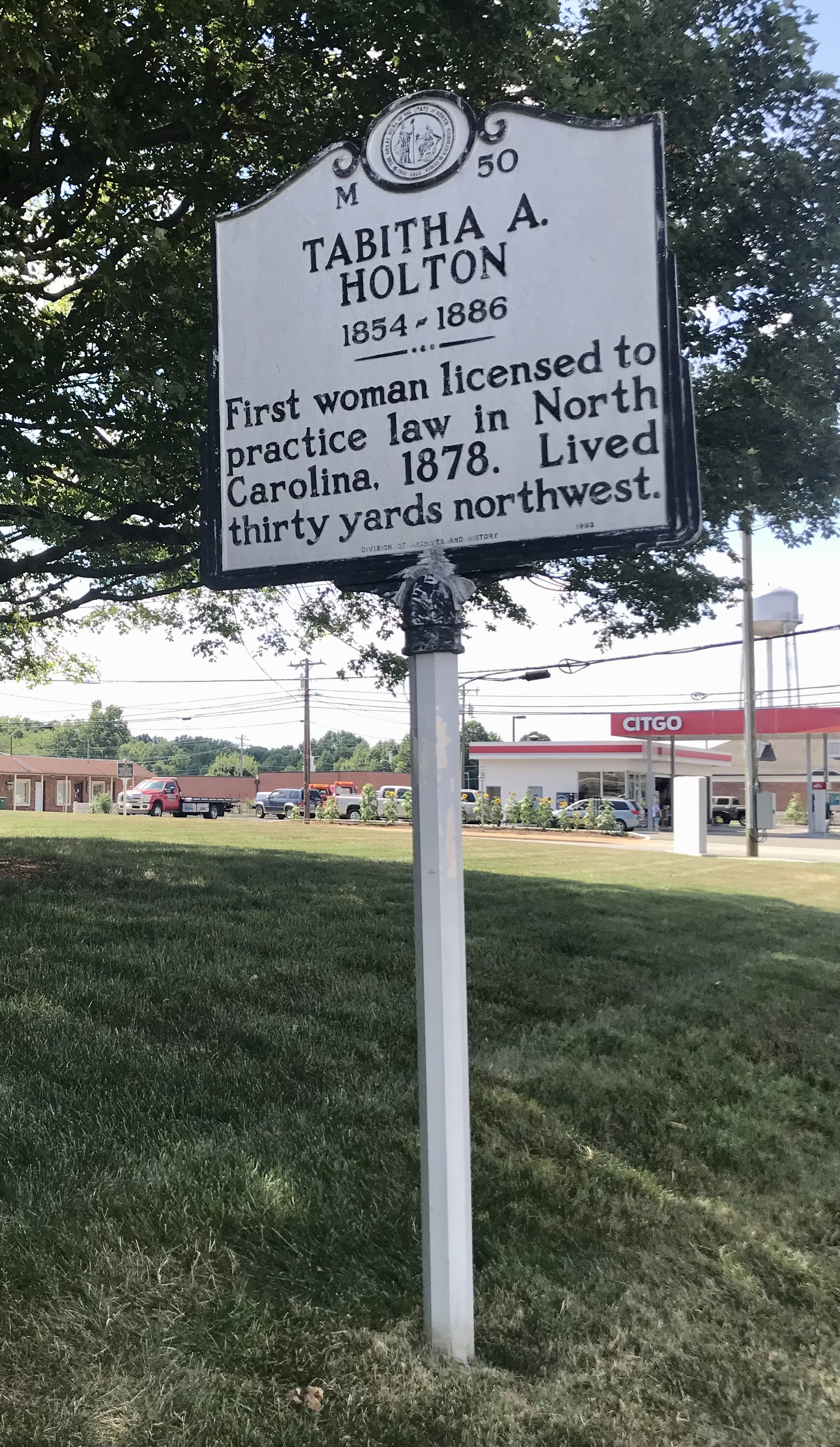
Historical marker in Dobson, North Carolina

On January 8, 1878, Tabitha and Samuel Holton went to the North Carolina Supreme Court in Raleigh to take the state bar exam. They planned to move to Kansas to set up a practice. Qualifying as lawyers in North Carolina would allow them to avoid the two-year residency requirement imposed by the Kansas Bar. Tabitha was the first woman in the state of North Carolina to apply for a law license and her gender gave the court pause. She was asked to come back the next morning to argue her case.

Holton was represented in court by Albion Winegar Tourgée. Tourgée argued that the statute read "all persons who may apply for admission to practice as attorneys" did not exclude women. He also pointed out that five states in the Union admitted women to the bar and that according to the 1868 state constitutional convention, "any person having license to practice in the highest courts of any other State, shall be admitted to practice…"

After deliberating only ten minutes, the justices gave Holton the right to take the bar examination which she immediately passed. Her license was dated January 8, 1878.

Tabitha and Samuel never followed through on their plan to move to Kansas. Instead, they set up a practice in Dobson, North Carolina.

Tabitha Holton died of tuberculosis on June 14, 1886.

In 1993 a historical marker was erected in Dobson to commemorate Holton.

== See also ==
- List of first women lawyers and judges in North Carolina
