= Rhoda Billings =

American judge (1937–2025)

Chief Justice of the North Carolina Supreme Court
- In office 1986
- Preceded by: Joseph Branch
- Succeeded by: James G. Exum

Personal details
- Born: Rhoda Jean Bryan; September 30, 1937 Wilkesboro, North Carolina, U.S.
- Died: December 29, 2025 (aged 88)
- Party: Republican
- Spouse: Donald R. Billings
- Children: 2
- Education: Berea College (BA); Wake Forest University (JD)
- Profession: Lawyer, judge

Rhoda Jean Bryan Billings (September 30, 1937 – December 29, 2025) was an American lawyer and a justice of the North Carolina Supreme Court.

== Life and career ==
Billings was a native of Wilkesboro, North Carolina. She earned her Juris Doctor degree from Wake Forest University School of Law in 1966. She served four years as a state District Court judge (1968–1972). From 1982 to 1984 Billings served on the Board of Governors of the North Carolina Bar Association. Governor James G. Martin, a fellow Republican, appointed her to the North Carolina Supreme Court as an associate justice in 1985, after the resignation of Justice Earl W. Vaughn. When Chief Justice Joseph Branch retired, Martin then appointed her Chief Justice in 1986, making her the second woman to head the Court. She was defeated by James G. Exum in the election for chief justice in November of that year.

She became a law professor at Wake Forest University, retiring in 2003 as Professor Emeritus. Billings was named in 2008 to the National Committee on the Right to Counsel established by the Constitution Project of Georgetown University's Public Policy Institute and the National Legal Aid and Defender Association.

Billings died on December 29, 2025, at the age of 88.

== See also ==
- List of female state supreme court justices

Legal offices
Preceded by Joseph Branch	Chief Justice of the North Carolina Supreme Court; 1986	Succeeded by James G. Exum
