= Alfred Laureta =

American judge (1924–2020)

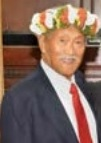

Judge of the District Court for the Northern Mariana Islands
- In office July 14, 1978 – November 18, 1988
- Appointed by: Jimmy Carter
- Preceded by: seat created
- Succeeded by: Alex R. Munson

Personal details
- Born: May 21, 1924 Ewa District, Oahu, Territory of Hawaii
- Died: November 16, 2020 (aged 96) Kauai, Hawaii, U.S.
- Education: University of Hawaiʻi at Mānoa (BEd); Fordham University (LLB)

Alfred Laureta (May 21, 1924 – November 16, 2020) was a district judge of the District Court for the Northern Mariana Islands.

== Early life and education ==
Laureta was born May 21, 1924, in Ewa District, Oahu, Territory of Hawaii. He earned his Bachelor of Education from the University of Hawaiʻi at Mānoa and his Bachelor of Laws from the Fordham University School of Law.

== Legal career ==
He served as a judge of the 1st Circuit Court in Honolulu from 1967 to 1969. From 1969 to 1978 he served as a judge of the 5th Circuit Court in Kauai.

== District Court service ==
He was recommended to a judgeship by Senator Daniel Inouye. On April 7, 1978, President Jimmy Carter nominated Laureta to be a judge of the District Court for the Northern Mariana Islands. On April 10, 1978, his nomination was sent to the United States Senate. He was confirmed in June 1978, was sworn in on July 14, 1978, and was the first federal judge of Filipino ancestry in U.S. history. He retired on November 18, 1988. He died on November 16, 2020, at the age of 96.

== Personal life ==
He met his wife Evelyn in New York while she was a nursing student and she died in 2012.

== See also ==
- List of Asian American jurists

Legal offices
New seat	Judge of the District Court for the Northern Mariana Islands; 1978–1988	Succeeded by Alex R. Munson
New seat	Chief Judge of the District Court for the Northern Mariana Islands; 1978–1988	Succeeded by Alex R. Munson
