= Belinda J. Foster =

American lawyer

The Honorable Belinda J. Foster is the first African American woman to serve as district attorney in North Carolina. Foster received a bachelor's degree in political science from Bennett College in 1979, and in 1985 she graduated from the University of North Carolina at Chapel Hill School of Law. She was appointed district attorney of Rockingham and Caswell counties in 1993.
