= Carmel Carrington Marr =

Lawyer and public official

Carmel Carrington Marr

Carmel Carrington Marr (June 23, 1921 - April 20, 2015) was a lawyer and public official from the United States whose career included service at the United Nations. She was the first black woman appointed to the New York State Public Service Commission where she served as a regulator of utilities, and later commissioner. She co-founded the Amistad Research Center with her husband Warren Q. Marr II.

Marr was born in Brooklyn to William P. and Gertrude Carrington, Barbadian immigrants to the United States. Marr graduated from Hunter College in 1945 with a Bachelor's degree in political science and from Columbia University Law School in 1948 with her JD. She was admitted to the New York State Bar in the same year.

In 1953, she was appointed to the United States Mission to the United Nations as a legal advisor and subsequently served as senior legal officer to the United Nations from 1967 to 1968, during which time she published on the work of the United Nations. Later in her career, she was chair of the Gas Research Institute's advisory board from 1979 to 1986, chairperson of the United States Department of Transportation’s Tech Pipeline Safety Standards Commission from 1979 to 1985.

She married Warren Marr, with whom she co-founded the Amistad Research Center. They had two children, Warren Quincy Marr III and Charles Carrington Marr. Marr died at the age of 93 from complications from Alzheimer's.
