= North Carolina State Bar =

- Type: State Agency
- Headquarters: Raleigh, North Carolina
- Location: United States
- Members: 22,100 in 2012 (3,100 out of state)
- Website: http://www.ncbar.com/

The North Carolina State Bar (NCSB) is the state agency charged with regulating the practice of law in the U.S. state of North Carolina. In contrast, the North Carolina Bar Association is a voluntary association.

== History ==
NCSB was established in 1933 by the North Carolina General Assembly as an agency of the state of North Carolina empowered to regulate the legal profession. Though operating pursuant to a legislative grant of authority, the State Bar exercises its regulatory powers under the direct and continuing supervision of the North Carolina Supreme Court, which by statute approves the State Bar's rules.

Every lawyer practicing law in North Carolina must be a member of the North Carolina State Bar.

== Structure ==
The State Bar is governed by a council consisting primarily of lawyers elected by bar members from the state's 42 judicial districts, and including three public members appointed by the governor of the state of North Carolina.

Admission to the North Carolina State Bar is the responsibility of the North Carolina Board of Law Examiners, which is a separate state agency from NCSB.

North Carolina has 44 Judicial District Bars, which are subdivisions of the North Carolina State Bar. Active members of the State Bar who reside in North Carolina must be a member of the judicial district bar where they reside or practice.

NCSB enforces the rule that North Carolina lawyers must complete 12 credits of Continuing Legal Education each year.

NCSB publishes the monthly North Carolina Bar Journal.

== Works cited ==
- "Professions : Attorneys". Popular Government. Vol. 1, no. 3. UNC Institute of Government. 1933. pp. 189–191.
