= Clifton Johnson (jurist) =

American jurist (1941–2009)

Clifton Earl Johnson (December 9, 1941 – June 25, 2009) was an American jurist who served on the North Carolina Court of Appeals from 1982 through 1996.

Johnson, who was born in Williamston and graduated from North Carolina Central University and its law school, was the first African-American to serve as a North Carolina District Court judge and the first to serve as chief judge of a district (in Mecklenburg County). In 1978, he became the first African-American elected superior court judge in the state since Reconstruction. Gov. Jim Hunt appointed Johnson to the Court of Appeals in 1982. He was elected statewide later that year and re-elected in 1990. Johnson retired in 1996 as the court's senior associate judge. He later served as a special emergency superior court judge until his sudden death at a conference of judges in 2009.

== See also ==
- List of African-American jurists
- List of first minority male lawyers and judges in New York
