= Edith Bornn =

United States Virgin Islander attorney (1922–2010)

- Born: Edith Lucille Bornn; August 30, 1922; Charlotte Amalie on St. Thomas in the U.S. Virgin Islands
- Died: June 4, 2010 (aged 87); Charlotte Amalie, St. Thomas, USVI
- Occupations: attorney, women's rights activist
- Years active: 1948–2002
- Known for: 1st woman practicing as a private law firm in the U.S. Virgin Islands

Edith Bornn (August 30, 1922 – June 4, 2010) was an American attorney from Saint Thomas, U.S. Virgin Islands, who became the first woman with a private law practice on the island. Known as an environmentalist, children's advocate and organizer of the island's chapter of the League of Women Voters (LWV), Bornn worked to improve legislation throughout the Caribbean for social and economic development. She served as president of the local chapter of the LWV and was president of the national U.S. organization from 1980 to 1982, as well as serving on numerous commissions for the government of the Virgin Islands.

== Early life ==
Edith Lucille Bornn was born on August 30, 1922, in Queen's Quarter of Charlotte Amalie on the island of St. Thomas in the U.S. Virgin Islands to Gladys Isabelle Louise (née Daniel) and David Victor Bornn. After completing her primary education, she enrolled at Charlotte Amalie High School. Upon her graduation, Bornn and her sister Angela moved to the United States and furthered their education at Barnard College Bornn was active in campus life, chairing the Representative Assembly and the National War Fund Drive. Graduating in 1945 with a degree in political science, she went on to further her education at Columbia University School of Law, graduating with a Bachelor of Laws in 1948, as one of only five women in her class, and passing the New York State bar examination.

== Career ==
Immediately after completing her schooling, Bornn began working for the United Nations' Caribbean Commission in Port of Spain, Trinidad, compiling a report on social legislation throughout the Caribbean. She worked for the commission and on the Governor's Committee for the Caribbean Basin Initiative for two years as a research librarian and legal secretary. Her position entailed traveling throughout the British West Indies, Cuba, the Dominican Republic and Puerto Rico to evaluate labor and social conditions in preparation for a report on improving legislation. While in Trinidad, she met her distant cousin, Andrew Bornn, whom she married on November 21, 1951, in St. Thomas. The Borrns made their home in St. Thomas, where she became a law clerk in the office of Herman E. Moore, U.S. District Court Judge for several years. The couple had three sons: David, Steven and Michael.

In 1955, Bornn opened her own law practice, becoming the first woman with a private practice in the Virgin Islands. She specialized in family law and particularly was interested in laws providing protection for women and children. In addition to her private practice, Bornn served on numerous government commissions including: Economic Stabilization Committee from 1961 to 1963; the Committee on Juvenile Delinquency from 1963 to 1965; and the Governor's Citizens Advisory Committee on Community Improvement from 1963 to 1969. She was very involved in environmental issues and concerned about overdevelopment, leading citizens' protests and participating in hearings to curtail resort expansion, which threatened beaches and wildlife refuges.

In 1956, Bornn became one of the founders of the Women's League, as well as founding the Virgin Island's chapter of the League of Women Voters (LWV). She served as president of the local chapter between 1976 and 1979, and was National President of the League of Women Voters of the United States between 1980 and 1982. She participated in numerous international women's conferences, encouraging women to become civically and politically active, through the LWV, the International Federation of Women Lawyers and the World Jurist Association, formerly known as the World Peace Through Law Center.

== Death and legacy ==
Bornn died on June 4, 2010, at the Roy Schneider Hospital in Charlotte Amalie after a long struggle with Alzheimer's disease. She is remembered as a legal pioneer in the U.S. Virgin Islands, for her activism for women and children and as an environmental and conservation advocate.

== See also ==
- First women lawyers around the world
