= District Court for the Northern Mariana Islands =

United States territorial court

- (D. N. Mar. I.)
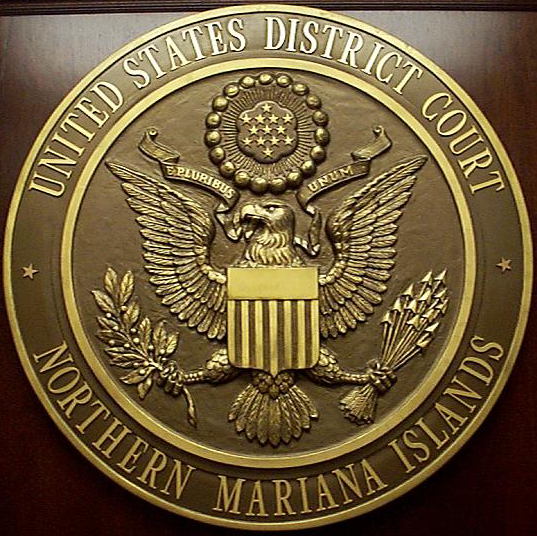
- Location: Saipan
- Appeals to: Ninth Circuit
- Established: 1977
- Authority: Article IV tribunal
- Created by: 48 U.S.C. §§ 1821–1826
- Composition method: Presidential nomination with Senate advice and consent
- Judges: 1
- Judge term length: 10 years (and until successor is chosen and qualified)
- Chief Judge: Ramona Villagomez Manglona

Officers of the court
- U.S. Attorney: Shawn N. Anderson
- U.S. Marshal: Fernando L. G. Sablan
- www.nmid.uscourts.gov

The District Court for the Northern Mariana Islands (in case citations, D. N. Mar. I.) is a federal territorial court whose jurisdiction comprises the United States-affiliated Commonwealth of the Northern Mariana Islands (CNMI). It was established by Act of Congress in 1977, pursuant to an international agreement between the United States and the CNMI that brought the CNMI under United States sovereignty. The court began hearing cases in January 1978. The court regularly sits in Saipan but may sit elsewhere in the CNMI. The court has the same jurisdiction as United States district courts, including diversity jurisdiction and bankruptcy jurisdiction. However, the District Court is not an Article III U.S. District Court, and because of that its judge is appointed for a 10-year term instead of for life. Appeals are taken to the Ninth Circuit.

Like most federal judges, judges in this court are appointed by the president, subject to Senate confirmation. Judges may serve more than one term, subject to the standard nominating process.

The United States is represented in civil and criminal litigation in the court by the United States Attorney's Office for the District of the Northern Mariana Islands.

The first District Judge appointed was Alfred Laureta, who served from 1978 until 1988. His successor, Alex R. Munson, was nominated by President Ronald Reagan, and confirmed by the Senate in 1988. Munson was nominated for a second ten-year term by President Bill Clinton and was confirmed by the Senate in 1998. He took senior status effective February 28, 2010. On January 26, 2011, President Obama nominated Ramona Villagomez Manglona to be Judge for the District Court for the Northern Mariana Islands for a term of ten years. The U.S. Senate confirmed her nomination by voice vote on July 26, 2011, and she received her commission on July 29, 2011. Her initial ten-year term ended on July 28, 2021, although she was allowed to continue serving until the confirmation of a successor. She was later nominated by President Joe Biden for a second ten-year term and confirmed by the U.S. Senate on April 16, 2024.

The District Court for the Northern Mariana Islands was established by Pub. L. 95–157, 91 Stat. 1265 (Nov. 8, 1977), and is codified at 48 U.S.C. § 1821, a nonpositive law title.

== Current judges ==
As of April 16, 2024:

#	Title	Judge	Duty station	Born	Term of service			Appointed by
#	Title	Judge	Duty station	Born	Active	Chief	Senior	Appointed by
3	Chief Judge	Ramona Villagomez Manglona	Saipan	1967	2011–present	2011–present	—	Obama; Biden (reappointment)

== Former judges ==
#	Judge	Born–died	Active service	Chief Judge	Senior status	Appointed by	Reason for termination
1	Alfred Laureta	1924–2020	1978–1988	1978–1988	—	Carter	Expiration of term
2	Alex R. Munson	1941–2025	1988–2010	1988–2010	2010–2025	Reagan; Clinton (reappointment)	Death

== See also ==
- List of current United States district judges
- List of United States federal courthouses in the Northern Mariana Islands
- United States Attorney for the Districts of Guam and the Northern Mariana Islands
- District Court of Guam
