= North Carolina Board of Law Examiners =

The North Carolina Board of Law Examiners is an independent agency charged with admitting attorneys to practice law in the State of North Carolina. The Board is made up of 11 members elected by the Council of the North Carolina State Bar, and the Board employs an Executive Director. The Board is required to hold two bar exams a year: one in February and another in July.

The board was created by state law passed in 1933 which required it to begin supervising examinations in February 1934.
