= Soraya Diase Coffelt =

Personal details
- Born: August 29, 1958 (age 68) St. Thomas, Virgin Islands, U.S.
- Party: Independent
- Spouse: Gordon Coffelt (1984–2013)
- Children: 2
- Education: University of Texas, Austin (BA); Cornell University (JD); University of Nevada, Reno (MJur)
- Website: Official website

Soraya Diase Coffelt (born August 29, 1958) is a lawyer and former judge of the United States Virgin Islands Superior Court. She was the first woman and first Hispanic from St. Thomas to serve as a judge.

Coffelt developed the V.I. High School Moot Court Competition in 1994, which is an annual, interscholastic competition for high school seniors, with winners receiving college scholarships.

== Early life and education ==
Soraya Diase Coffelt was born in Saint Thomas, U.S. Virgin Islands, to lower-middle-class parents, who were small business owners. Coffelt earned an undergraduate degree in political science from the University of Texas at Austin, graduating with honors in 1978. She then attended Cornell Law School and graduated in 1981 with a Juris Doctor degree. Coffelt attended the University of Nevada at Reno and the National Judicial College, where she earned a degree of Master of Judicial Studies, with a major in trial judges, in 2001.

== Publications ==
In 2014, she published her first book for children titled It's Not About You, Mr. Santa Claus- A Love Letter About The True Meaning Of Christmas. In 2015, Coffelt announced that the second and third books in the "It's Not About You" series would be released. It's Not About You, Mr. Pumpkin- A Love Letter About the True Meaning of Halloween will tell the story of the true origins of Halloween. It's Not About You, Mrs. Turkey- A Love Letter About The True Meaning of Thanksgiving will tell the story of the origins of Thanksgiving.

== 2014 Virgin Islands gubernatorial campaign ==
Coffelt, an independent candidate, ran with John Canegata, a registered Republican, as an "Independent" or "no party" team for governor and lieutenant governor in the November, 2014 gubernatorial election. This was the first time in Virgin Islands history that such a dual candidacy team had occurred. The supervisor of elections had initially disqualified the team, but they filed suit and the Third Circuit Court of Appeals affirmed their candidacy pursuant to Virgin Islands law. The team finished in third place in the general election held on November 4, 2014.

Diase-Coffelt was announced as the territory's attorney general on December 30, 2014, but resigned the post very shortly thereafter, stating that she would not serve as a "puppet" for Gov. Mapp.

== Personal life ==
Coffelt met her husband Gordon on St. Thomas. Her husband was diagnosed with Parkinson's disease and died in 2013. They had been married for 29 years.
