= North Carolina Bar Association =

- Type: Legal society
- Headquarters: Cary, North Carolina
- Location: United States
- Members: 14,000+ in 2013 (750 out of state)
- Website: http://www.ncbar.org/

The North Carolina Bar Association (NCBA) is the voluntary (non-mandatory) bar association of the U.S. state of North Carolina. NCBA membership is voluntary and tax money is not involved in its support. In contrast, the North Carolina State Bar and the North Carolina Board of Law Examiners are state agencies.

== Overview ==
The NCBA is a voluntary organization of lawyers, paralegals and law students. The NCBA is led by the NCBA Board of Governors and a president, who serves a one-year term.

Some of the members of the Board of Governors also serve on the Board of Directors for the NCBA Foundation, Inc. The NCBA is a 501(c)(6) trade organization; the NCBA Foundation is a 501(c)(3) charitable organization.

The NCBA is divided into thirty-one sections focusing on different areas of legal practice, such as bankruptcy, criminal justice, and labor law. The organization also provides a lawyer referral service and provides legal education resources.

== History ==
The first NCBA Annual Meeting was held July 5–7, 1899 in Morehead City, North Carolina. There have been four more presidents than annual meetings: Platt W. Walker of Charlotte, the first president, served his term prior to the first annual meeting; Hamilton C. Jones (1904) and T.L. Caudle (1929) died in office; and Linville K. Martin (1942) resigned when he was called into military service during World War II. The NCBA Foundation was established in 1960, and the NCBA Foundation Endowment was later established in 1987.

== Distinct from the North Carolina State Bar ==
The NCBA is a service organization for legal professionals providing continuing legal education, legislative advocacy, and practice management support. The State Bar, meanwhile, regulates the practice of law and is a separate organization.

William M. Storey, who served as executive vice president and secretary of the NCBA for 26 years, spoke about the establishment of the State Bar and the Board of Law Examiners:

"In 1903 the Association requested the General Assembly to grant to the lawyers of the State the responsibility for examining, licensing and disbarring members of the profession. By 1915 the Association was successful in securing from the General Assembly authorization to create a board of legal examiners which consisted of the Chief Justice and two Associate Justices of the Supreme Court – thus relieving the Association from the burden of attempting to handle the admission matters. By 1932, the Association had agreed that an incorporated bar established by legislative enactment was necessary to control the examination, licensing and disbarment of attorneys and to prevent the unauthorized practice of the law. A bill was drawn by the North Carolina Bar Association and the 1933 General Assembly enacted Chapter 210 of the public laws. It was ratified on April 3, 1933, creating the North Carolina State Bar."

The distinction between the NCBA and the NCBA Foundation is described by Allan B. Head, who led the NCBA and the NCBA Foundation from 1981 to 2017, as follows:

"In 1960, the N.C. Bar Association established its own Foundation. The primary reason to establish the Foundation was to conduct education, research and public service projects of the North Carolina Bar Association. However, the Association, a 501(c)(6) professional association, also established this 501(c)(3) tax-exempt charitable entity for tax purposes. For instance, in connection with the establishment of the Foundation, the Association, in 1960, was completing its first bar center and there were a number of gifts, land and cash contributions made to the Foundation which as charitable contributions qualified for tax deductions. This would not have been possible for a 501(c)(6)."

== NCBA Foundation ==
The NCBA Foundation owns the N.C. Bar Center and the NCBA is a tenant. The current home of the NCBA and the NCBA Foundation opened in August 1994 and is the third N.C. Bar Center. The original N.C. Bar Center at 1025 Wade Ave. in Raleigh was constructed and occupied in 1962; the second N.C. Bar Center at 1312 Annapolis Drive in Raleigh was purchased and occupied in 1983.
