= List of first women lawyers and judges in New York =

This is a list of the first women lawyer(s) and judge(s) in New York. It includes the year in which the women were admitted to practice law (in parentheses). Also included are women who achieved other distinctions such becoming the first in their state to graduate from law school or become a political figure.

== Firsts in state history ==
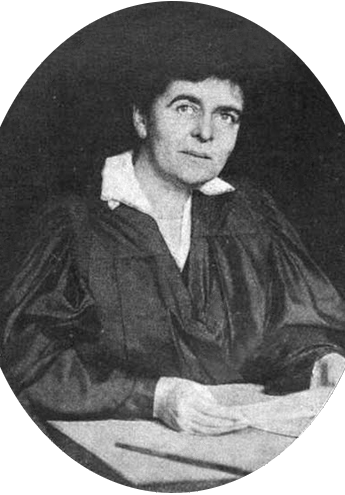
Jean H. Norris: First female magistrate in New York (1919)

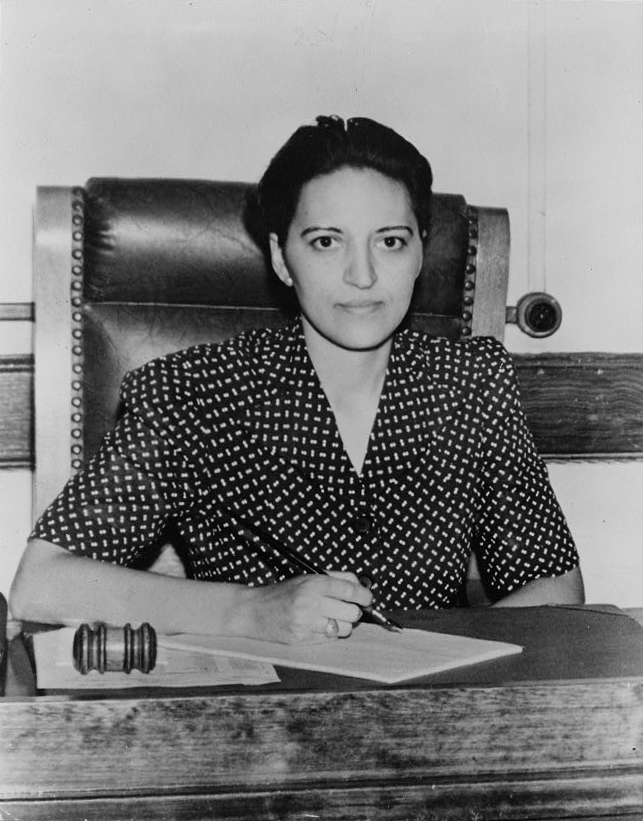
Jane Bolin: First African American female judge in New York

=== Lawyers ===
- Kate Stoneman (1886): First female lawyer in New York
- Rosalie Loew Whitney (1895): First Jewish American female lawyer in New York
- Helen Z.M. Rodgers (1899): First female lawyer to try a case before the New York State Court of Appeals
- Georgia Hare (c. 1910): First female lawyer registered with the New York State Bar Association
- Ruth Whitehead Whaley (1924): First African American female lawyer in New York
- Tsuneko Tokuyasu (1950): Reputed to be the first Japanese American female lawyer in New York
- Irma Vidal Santaella (1961): First Puerto Rican American female lawyer in New York
- Judith Lewis Meggesto (c. 1970s): First Native American (Onondaga people) female lawyer in New York
- Loida Nicholas Lewis (1974): First Asian American female to pass the New York State Bar exam
- Sylvia O. Hinds-Radix: First Caribbean-born (female) to serve as corporation counsel in New York
- Machaille Hassan Al Naimi (2013): First Qatari female admitted to the New York State Bar
- Kuenley Lhaden Gyaltshen (2025): First Bhutanese female to pass the New York State Bar exam

=== State judges ===
- Jean H. Norris: First female magistrate in New York (1919)
- Rebekah Bettelheim Kohut: First female judge on the Jewish Court of Arbitration in New York City (1927)
- Justine W. Polier: First female judge in New York (1936)
- Jane Bolin (1932): First African American female judge in New York (1939)
- Dorothy Chin Brandt (1975): First Asian-American elected official in New York; First Asian-American (Chinese-American) female judge in New York (1987).
- Marilyn Shafer: First openly lesbian judge in New York (1993)
- Faviola Soto (1979): First Dominican American (female) elected as a judge in New York (1994) and serve on the New York Court of Claims
- Margareth Jourdan: First Haitian American (female) judge in New York (2001)
- Wavny Toussaint: First Trinidadian American (female) elected as a judge in New York (upon being elected to the New York City Civil Court of Kings County in 2002)
- Toko Serita: First Japanese American female judge in New York (2005)
- Margarita Lopez-Torres: First Latino American (female) to serve as a Surrogate in New York State (2006)
- Betty Calvo-Torres: First Latino American (female) elected as a judge in Buffalo, New York (2007)
- Carmen Velasquez: First Ecuadorian American (female) elected as a judge in New York (2009)
- Mojgan Lanman: First Iranian American (female) elected as a judge in New York (2014)
- Raja Rajeswari (1999): First Indian American and South Asian female judge in New York (2015)
- Karen Gopee: First Indo-Caribbean (female) appointed as a judge by a New York mayor (2015)
- Kathryn S. Paek (1997): First Korean American female appointed judge in New York (2015)
- Dweynie Esther Paul: First Haitian American (female) elected as a civil court judge in New York (2015)
- Judy Kim (1989): First Korean American female elected judge in New York (2016)
- Rachel Freier (2006): First Hasidic Jewish American female judge in New York (2017)
- Connie Mallafre Melendez (1987): First Cuban American female elected as a judge in New York (2017)
- Lillian Wan (2000): First Asian American female to become a Judge of the New York Court of Claims (2018)
- Soma Syed: First Bangladeshi American and Muslim female elected as a judge in New York (upon becoming a judge in New York City's Queens County in 2021)
- Edit Shkreli: First Albanian American (female) judge in New York (2023)
- Norma Jennings: First African American lesbian civil court judge in New York (2025)
- Eve Cho Guillergan: First Korean Filipino American (female) civil court judge in New York (2026)

==== Supreme Court ====
- Birdie Amsterdam (1922): First female to become a Justice of the New York State Supreme Court (the state's highest trial court) (1959)
- Betty Weinberg Ellerin (1952): First female appointed as an Associate Justice of the New York State Supreme Court (1985)
- Myriam Altman: Co-First female Justice appointed to Commercial Pilot Parts in New York State Supreme Court, New York County (1993)
- Beatrice Shainswit: Co-First female Justice appointed to Commercial Pilot Parts in New York State Supreme Court, New York County (1993)
- Carolyn E. Demarest: First female Justice appointed to New York Supreme Court Commercial Division, Brooklyn, Kings County (2002)
- Elizabeth Hazlitt Emerson: First female Justice appointed to New York Supreme Court Commercial Division, Suffolk County (2002)
- Deborah H. Karalunas: First female Justice appointed to New York Supreme Court Commercial Division, Onandaga County (2007)
- Mary Johnson Lowe (1955): First African American female elected to the New York State Supreme Court (1977)
- Irma Vidal Santaella (1961): First Puerto Rican American female appointed as a Justice of the New York Supreme Court (1983)
- Marcy Kahn (1975): First openly LGBT female appointed as a Justice of the New York State Supreme Court (1994)
- Doris Ling-Cohan (1979): First Asian American female elected to the New York State Supreme Court (2002)
- Diccia Pineda-Kirwan: First Hispanic American female to be elected to the New York State Supreme Court (2009)
- Carmen Velasquez: First Ecuadorian American (female) to serve as a Judge for the Civil Court and Supreme Court of the State of New York (2015)
- Janet C. Malone: First Black female to serve as a Justice of the New York State Supreme Court, Ninth Judicial District (2017)
- Karen Gopee: First Indo-Caribbean (female) appointed as a Justice of the New York Supreme Court (2021)

==== Supreme Court, Appellate Division (By Department) ====
- Betty Weinberg Ellerin (1952): First female appointed as the Presiding Justice of the Appellate Division, New York State Supreme Court, First Department (1999)
- Rosalyn Richter (1979): First openly LGBT female appointed as a Justice of the Appellate Division, New York State Supreme Court, First Department (2009)
- Dianne Renwick (1986): First African American female appointed as a Justice of the Appellate Division, New York State Supreme Court, First Department (2008)
- Sallie Manzanet-Daniels: First Hispanic American female Justice of the New York State Supreme Court, Appellate Division, First Department (2009)
- Bianka Perez: First Dominican American (female) to serve as a Justice of the New York State Supreme Court, Appellate Division, First Department (2023)
- Geraldine T. Eiber: First female appointed as a Justice of the Appellate Division, New York State Supreme Court, Second Department (1984)
- Sandra L. Townes: First African American female appointed as a Justice of the Appellate Division, New York State Supreme Court, Second Department (2001)
- A. Gail Prudenti: First female appointed as the Presiding Justice of the Appellate Division, New York State Supreme Court, Second Department (2002)
- Betsy Barros: First Hispanic American female appointed as a Justice of the Appellate Division, New York State Supreme Court, Second Department (2014)
- Karen K. Peters: First female elected as a Justice of the New York State Supreme Court, Third Department (1992). She later became the first female to become the Presiding Justice of the Third Department (2012).
- Ann T. Mikoll: First female appointed as a Justice of the Appellate Division, New York State Supreme Court, Third Department (1977)
- Elizabeth A. Garry: First openly LGBT female appointed as a Justice of the Appellate Division, New York State Supreme Court, Third Department (2009)
- M. Dolores Denman: First female appointed as an Associate Justice of the Appellate Division, New York State Supreme Court, Fourth Department (1977). She later became the first female to serve as the Presiding Justice of the Fourth Department (1991).
- Rose Sconiers: First female (and African American female) appointed as a Justice of the Appellate Division, New York State Supreme Court, Fourth Department (2010)
- Ann C. Crowell: First female appointed as a Justice of the New York State Supreme Court, Fourth Judicial District (2011)
- Christina Ryba: First African African female appointed as a Justice of the New York State Supreme Court, Third Judicial District (2015)
- Grace Hanlon: First openly LGBT female appointed as a Justice of the New York Supreme Court, Eighth Judicial District (2022)

==== Appellate Court ====
- Judith Kaye (1963): First female to serve on the New York State Court of Appeals (1984) and serve as its Chief Judge (1993)
- Carmen Ciparick (1967): First Hispanic American female (and Hispanic in general) to serve on the New York State Court of Appeals (1993)
- Victoria A. Graffeo: First Italian American female to serve as a Judge of the New York State Court of Appeals (2000)
- Sheila Abdus-Salaam (1977): First African American female appointed as an Associate Judge of the New York State Court of Appeals (2013)
- Doris Ling-Cohan (1979): First Asian American female to become an appellate judge in New York State (2014) and sit on the Appellate Term (2014)
- Jenny Rivera (1985): First Hispanic American female to serve on the New York State Court of Appeals without having had a prior judgeship (2013)
- Madeline Singas: First Greek American female to serve as a Judge of the New York State Court of Appeals (2021)

==== Chief Administrator ====
- Ann Pfau: First female to serve as the Chief Administrative Judge of the State of New York (2007)
- Betty Weinberg Ellerin: First female to serve as the Deputy Chief Administrative Judge of the State of New York (1982)
- Fern Fisher: First African American female to serve as the Deputy Chief Administrative Judge of the State of New York (2009)

=== Federal judges ===
- Amalya Lyle Kearse (c. 1960s): First African American female to serve on the U.S. Court of Appeals for the Second Circuit (1979)
- Sonia Sotomayor (1980): First Hispanic female to serve on the U.S. District Court for the Southern District of New York (1992)
- Marilyn Go: First Asian American female to serve as a Judge of the United States District Court for the Eastern District of New York (1993)
- Deborah Batts (1972): First openly LGBT / African American female to serve on the U.S. District Court for the Southern District of New York (1994)
- Dora Irizarry (1979): First Hispanic female to serve on the United States District Court for the Eastern District of New York (2004)
- Alison J. Nathan (2000): First openly LGBT female to serve on the U.S. District Court for the Southern District of New York (2011)
- Lorna G. Schofield (1981): First Filipino American female to serve on the U.S. District Court for the Southern District of New York (2012)
- Thérèse Wiley Dancks: First female to serve as a U.S. Magistrate Judge for the Northern District of New York (2012)
- Elizabeth A. Wolford (1992): First woman to serve on the U.S. District Court for the Western District of New York (2013). She became the first female Chief Judge in 2021.
- Pamela K. Chen (1986): First openly LGBT / Asian American female to serve on the U.S. District Court for the Eastern District of New York (2013)
- Peggy Kuo: First Taiwanese American (female) to serve as a Judge of the Eastern District of New York (2015)
- Ona Wang: First Asian American female (and Asian American in general) to serve as the U.S. Magistrate Judge for the Southern District of New York (2019)
- Margo Kitsy Brodie: First African American (female) to serve as the Chief Judge of the U.S. District Court for the Eastern District of New York (2021)
- Valerie Figueredo: First Latino American female to serve as the U.S. Magistrate Judge for the Southern District of New York (2022)
- Brenda K. Sannes: First female to serve as the Chief Judge of the U.S. District Court for the Northern District of New York (2022)
- Nusrat Choudhury: First Muslim American female and Bangladeshi American [female] to serve as a Judge of the U.S. District Court for the Eastern District of New York (2023)
- Meredith Vacca: First Asian American female to serve as a Judge of the Western District of New York (2024)

=== Attorneys General ===
- Barbara Underwood (1969): First female Acting Attorney General of New York (2018)
- Letitia "Tish" James (1989): First female (and African American female) elected as the Attorney General of New York (2018)

=== Deputy Attorneys General ===
- Julie R. Jenny (1894) and Jeanette Goodman Brill (1910): First female to serve as the Deputy Attorney General for New York (both in 1923)

=== Assistant Attorney General ===
- Julie R. Jenny (1894): First female to serve as the Assistant Attorney General for New York (1920)

=== Solicitor General ===
- Ruth Kessler Toch: First female Solicitor General of New York (1966)

=== United States Attorney ===
- Mary Jo White: First female to serve as the U.S. Attorney for the Southern District of New York (1993-2002)
- Denise O’Donnell: First female to serve as the U.S. Attorney for the Western District of New York (1998)
- Carla B. Freedman: First female to serve as the U.S. Attorney for the Northern District of New York (2021)
- Trini E. Ross: First African American female to serve as the U.S. Attorney for the Western District of New York (2021)

=== Assistant United States Attorney ===
- Florence Perlow Shientag: First female to serve as an Assistant U.S. Attorney for the Southern District of New York (1941)
- Paula Ryan Conan and Nancy S. Jones: First females to serve as Assistant U.S. Attorneys for the Northern District of New York (1978)

=== Special Assistant U.S. Attorney ===
- Mary Grace Quackenbos Humiston (1904): First female to serve as a Special Assistant United States Attorney in the U.S. and the Southern District of New York (1906)

=== County Attorney ===
- Jane Hill Gordon: First female to serve as a County Attorney in New York (1944)

=== District Attorneys ===
- Charlotte Smallwood-Cook: First female elected as a District Attorney in New York (1950-1953)
- Madeline Singas: First Greek American female to serve as a District Attorney in New York (2015)

=== Assistant District Attorney ===
- Helen P. McCormick (1913): First female to serve as an Assistant District Attorney in New York (1918)
- Eunice Carter (1933): First African American female to serve as an Assistant District Attorney in New York (1935). She was considered New York's first African American female prosecutor.

=== Political Office ===
- Mary Lilly (1895): First female (a lawyer) elected to the New York State legislature (1918)
- Geraldine Ferraro (1961): First female (a lawyer) vice presidential candidate for a major U.S. political party (1984)
- Hillary Clinton (1973): First female (a lawyer) Senator for New York (2000). She would later become the first female U.S. presidential candidate for a major political party (2016)
- Kathy Hochul: First female (a lawyer) to serve as the Governor of New York (2021)
- Jenifer Rajkumar: First South Asian-Indian American female (a lawyer) elected to a New York State office (2021)

=== Bar Association ===
- Maryann Saccomando Freedman (1958): First female President of the New York State Bar Association (1987)

== Firsts in local history ==
Alphabetized by county name

=== Regions ===
- Julie R. Jenny (1894): First female lawyer in Central New York
- Lucinda M. Finley: First female lawyer from Western New York to argue a case before the U.S. Supreme Court
- Mae D’Agostino: First female from Upstate New York to serve as a district court judge in New York (2011)

=== New York City (in general) ===
- Jean H. Norris: First female magistrate in New York City, New York (1919)
- Clarice Baright (1905): First Jewish female magistrate in New York City, New York (c. 1925)
- Jane Bolin (1932): First African American female admitted to the New York City Bar Association and to join the New York City Law Department
- Mary Bednar: First openly LGBT female to serve on the New York City Family Court (1986)
- Patricia DiMango: First Italian American female to serve as a Judge of the Criminal Court of the City of New York (1995)
- Diccia Pineda-Kirwan: First Hispanic American female to be elected as Judge of the Civil Court (2002)
- Toko Serita: First Japanese American female appointed to the New York City Criminal Court (2005)
- Lillian Wan: First Asian American female to serve on the Family Court in New York City (2012)
- Judy Kim: First Korean American female elected judge in New York City, New York (2016)
- Doris Ling-Cohan (1979): First Asian American elected in district that includes Manhattan's Chinatown (1995), when elected to Civil Court.
- Barbara Paul Robinson: First female to serve as the President of the New York City Bar Association
- Sheila Boston: First African American female to serve as the President of the New York City Bar Association (2020)
- Georgia Pestana: First female (who is of Latino descent) to lead the New York City Law Department (2021)

=== Albany County ===
- Margaret Walsh: First openly LGBT female elected as a Judge of the Albany County Family Court, Third Department (2004)
- Mae D’Agostino: First female from Albany to serve as a Judge of the Northern District Court of New York (2011)
- Jasmine Norman: First African American (female) to serve as a Judge of Watervliet City Court, Albany County, New York (2024)

=== Bronx County (New York City) ===
- Cira Martinez: First Hispanic female to serve as a Judge of the Bronx Family Court (1992) [Bronx County, New York]
- Doris Gonzalez: First female (and Latino American female) to serve as a Justice of the Bronx Supreme Court, New York (2007)
- Nelida Malave-Gonzales: First Hispanic American female elected as the Surrogate in the Bronx (2012) [Bronx County, New York]
- Darcel Clark: First female District Attorney for Bronx County, New York (2016)
- Edit Shkreli: First Albanian American (female) elected as a judge in Bronx County, New York (2023)

=== Broome County ===
- Kathryn Grant Madigan: First female President of the Broome County Bar Association (1988)
- Mary Anne Lehmann: First woman elected to a full time judgeship on the Binghamton City Court (1997) and as an Acting Judge of the Broome County Court (2002)

=== Cattaraugus County ===
- Lucy Thayer Waring (1900): First female lawyer in Cattaraugus County, New York
- Lori Rieman: First female to serve as the District Attorney for Cattaraugus County, New York (2009)

=== Cayuga County ===
- Brittany Grome Antonacci: First female to serve as District Attorney for Cayuga County, New York
- Kristin Garland: First female judge in Auburn, New York (2019) [Cayuga County, New York]

=== Chautauqua County ===
- Judith Claire: First female elected as a judge in Chautauqua County, New York (1999)

=== Chemung County ===
- Minnie Knipp Porter: First female lawyer in Elmira, New York [Chemung County, New York]

=== Chenango County ===
- Jane Hill Gordon: First female to serve as the County Attorney for Chenango County, New York (1944)
- Laura R. Parker: First female to serve as an Assistant District Attorney for Chenango County, New York (2015)

=== Columbia County ===
- Victoria K. Hill: First female elected as a Justice in the town of Greenport, Columbia County, New York (2015)

=== Delaware County ===
- Mabel Fenton: First female lawyer in Delaware County, New York

=== Dutchess County ===
- Anna G. W. Dayley: First female lawyer in Dutchess County, New York
- Jane Bolin (1932): First African American female (and African American in general) to serve as the President of the Dutchess County Bar Association, New York

=== Erie County ===
- Helen Z.M. Rodgers and Cecilia Bertha Wiener (1899): First women to graduate from the University at Buffalo School [Erie County, New York]
- Helen Z.M. Rodgers (1899): First female lawyer in Buffalo, New York [Erie County, New York]
- Winifred Claire Stanley (1934): First female to serve as the Assistant District Attorney for Erie County, New York (c. 1940)
- Carol McCormick Crosswell Smith (1945): First female lawyer from Erie County to join the United Nations' legal staff (1948)
- Barbara Merriweather Sims (1955): First African American female to graduate from the University of Buffalo [Erie County, New York]
- Madge Taggart: First female to serve as the Buffalo City Court Judge (1952) and an Erie County Family Court Judge (1962)
- Rose LaMendola: First female to become a Judge of the Erie County Court Judge (1974)
- Maryann Saccomando Freedman: First female lawyer to become president of the New York Bar Foundation (1974), the Bar Association of Erie County (1981), and the New York State Bar Association (1987)
- Barbara Howe: First female to serve as a surrogate judge for Erie County, New York (2003)
- Betty Calvo-Torres: First Hispanic female to serve on the Buffalo City Court bench (2007)

=== Essex County ===
- Julie A. Garcia: First female to serve as the District Attorney of Essex County, New York (2006-2009)
- Kristy Sprague: First female judge in Essex County, New York (2025)

=== Franklin County ===
- Florence Boyce Bryant (1906): Reputed to be the first woman to practice law in Franklin County, New York

=== Genesee County ===
- Fern Kathleen Acomb: First female Public Defender for Genesee County, New York

=== Herkimer County ===
- Helen T. Hooley (1902): First female lawyer in Herkimer County, New York

=== Jefferson County ===
- Amy Sayyeau-Simpson: First female elected as a judge in Rodman, New York [Jefferson County, New York]
- Catherine J. Palermo: First female to become a Judge of the Watertown City Court [Jefferson County, New York]

=== Kings County (New York City) ===
- Jeanette G. Brill (1910): First female magistrate in Brooklyn, New York (Kings County, New York; 1929)
- Elizabeth Holtzman (1965): First female District Attorney for Kings County, New York (1982-1989)
- Patricia DiMango: First Italian American female to serve as a Justice of the Supreme Court of Kings County, New York (2002)
- Margarita Lopez-Torres: First Latino American female elected to the Civil Court (1992) and serve as the Surrogate in Kings County (2006)
- Betsy Barros: First Hispanic American female elected to the Supreme Court of Kings County, New York (1997)
- Debra Silber: First openly LGBT female elected to the Civil Court in Kings County, New York (1998)
- Lynn Terrelonge: First Black (female) President of the Brooklyn Bar Association (2001)
- ShawnDya L. Simpson: First Panamanian-American (female) to serve as a Judge of the Brooklyn Supreme Court (2017)

=== Livingston County ===
- Helen Pratt (1928): First female lawyer in Livingston County, New York
- Jennifer Noto: First female judge in Livingston County, New York (2020)
- Ashley Williams: First female District Attorney for Livingston County, New York (2025)

=== Monroe County ===
- Patricia D. Marks First female elected as a Monroe County Court Judge (Monroe County, New York: 1984)
- Sandra Dooley: First female District Attorney for Monroe County, New York (2011)
- Karen Bailey Turner: First African American (female) to serve as a Judge of the Monroe County Court (2019)
- Maria Cubillos Reed: First Hispanic American (female) judge to preside in Monroe County Family Court (2023)
- Ellen Yacknin: First openly LGBT female elected as a Judge of the City Court of Rochester, Fourth Department (Monroe County, New York; 2002)
- Paula C. Metzler: First female elected as Penfield Town Justice (2019)

=== Nassau County ===
- H. Barteau: First female lawyer in Nassau County, New York
- Grace D. Moran: First female to serve as the President of the Nassau County Bar Association (1994)
- Kathleen Rice: First female District Attorney for Long Island (c. 2010) [Nassau County, New York]
- Linda Kelly Mejias-Glover: First Latino American female to serve as a Judge of the Nassau County Family Court (2017)

=== New York County (New York City) ===
- Joan Lobis: First openly LGBT female elected to the New York City Supreme Court (1992), as well as the Civil Court in New York County
- Rita Mella: First Hispanic American female elected as the Surrogate in New York County (2012)
- Doris Ling-Cohan (1979): First Asian American female elected to the New York State Supreme Court (2002) and first Asian American female appointed to a New York State appellate court. First Asian American elected in district that includes Manhattan's Chinatown (1995), when elected to Civil Court.

=== Niagara County ===
- Jacqueline M. Koshian (1959): First female to serve on the Niagara Falls City Court [Niagara County, New York]
- Caroline Wojtaszek: First female District Attorney for Niagara County, New York (2017)

=== Oneida County ===
- Winifred E. Welden (1915): First female lawyer in Oneida County, New York
- Bernadette Romano Clark (1989): First female judge in Oneida County, New York (2000)
- Stephanie Viscelli: First female to serve as a Judge of the Rome City Court (2023) [Oneida County, New York]

=== Onondaga County ===
- Julie R. Jenny (1894): First female lawyer in Onondaga County, New York
- M. Catherine Richardson: First female to serve as President of the Onondaga County Bar Association (1987)

=== Ontario County ===
- Carrie Crane (1901): First female lawyer in Ontario County, New York [specifically Canandaigua, New York]
- Holly Adams: First female appointed as County Attorney for Ontario County, New York (2018) [specifically Canandaigua, New York]
- Kristina "Kitty" Karle: First female to become a Judge of the Ontario County Court in New York (2018)

=== Orange County ===
- Sadye Lascher: First female judicial officer for the city court in Orange County, New York
- Hyun Chin Kim: First Asian American (female) to serve as a Judge of the County Court in Orange County, New York (2018)

=== Orleans County ===
- Susan Howard: First female District Attorney for Orleans County, New York (2025)

=== Oswego County ===
- Kim Seager: First female judge in Oswego County, New York

=== Queens County (New York City) ===
- Florence V. Lucas (1940): First African American female lawyer in Queens County, New York
- Mojgan Lanman: First Iranian American female to serve as a Judge of the New York City Civil Court Queens County (2014)
- Diccia Pineda-Kirwan: First Hispanic American female elected as a Judge of the Civil Court in Queens County, New York (2002)
- Lourdes Ventura: First Latino American female to serve as the President of the Queens County Bar Association, New York (2015)
- Chereé A. Buggs: First African American female judge elected in Queens County to be appointed to the Appellate Term (2023)

=== Rensselaer County ===
- Mary O. Donohue: First female District Attorney for Rensselaer County, New York (1992)
- Debra Young: First female to serve as a Judge of the Rensselaer County Court (2012)

=== Richmond County ===
- Soukaina Sourouri: First Arab American male to serve as President of the Staten Island Women’s Bar Association (2023)

=== Rockland County ===
- Natalie Couch (c. 1910s): First woman to practice law in Rockland County, New York
- Roselina D'Annucci: First Latino American female judge in Rockland County, New York (2017)
- Margareth Jourdan: First Haitian American (female) judge in Spring Valley, New York (2001)
- Alejandra Silva-Exias: First Hispanic American (female) judge in Ramapo, Rockland County, New York (2024)

=== Saratoga County ===
- Francine Vero: First female to serve as a Judge of the City Court in Saratoga Springs, New York [Saratoga County, New York]
- Dianne N. Freestone: First female to serve as an Assistant Public Defender for Saratoga County, New York (1987-1989)
- Jennifer Jensen Bergan: First female elected as Judge of the Saratoga County Family Court Judge (2011)
- Karen Heggen: First female District Attorney for Saratoga County, New York (2015)

=== Schenectady County ===
- Teneka Frost: First African American female (and African American in general) to become a Judge of the Schenectady City Court (2018) [Schenectady County, New York]

=== Schoharie County ===
- Nellie Mae Crosby (c. 1939): First female lawyer in Schoharie County, New York
- Susan J. Mallery: First female to serve as District Attorney for Schoharie County, New York (2018)

=== Steuben County ===
- Jennifer Donlon (2000): First female lawyer in Hornell, New York (Steuben County, New York)
- Susan B. Florek (1980): First Female Assistant District Attorney in Steuben County, New York

=== Suffolk County ===
- Lucy L. Liedtke (1913) and Syrena Stackpole (1919): First female lawyers respectively in Suffolk County, New York
- Bertha Rembaugh: First female Justice of the Peace for Huntington, New York (1938-1945) [Suffolk County, New York]
- Catherine T. England (1940): First female Judge of the Suffolk County Family Court and first female Justice of the Suffolk County Supreme Court
- Anne Mead (1951): First female judge of the District Court in Suffolk County, New York
- Marguerite A. Smith (1975): First Native American (Shinnecock Indian Nation) female lawyer in Suffolk County, New York
- Rita Adler (1975): First female Assistant District Attorney in Suffolk County, New York
- Mary M. Werner (1978): First female District Administrative Judge in Suffolk County, New York
- Valerie S. Manzo (1980): Co-founder and first President of Suffolk County Women's Bar Association
- Patricia E. Salkin (1989): First female lawyer to become a school Dean in Suffolk County, New York
- Christine Malafi (1991): First female County Attorney of Suffolk County, New York
- Victoria Gumbs-Moore: First African American (female) elected as a Judge of the Family Court in Suffolk County, New York (2020)

=== Sullivan County ===
- Nellie Childs Smith, Rose Rosen and Frances Cosor: First female lawyers in Sullivan County, New York
- Cheryl McCausland: First female to serve as the County Attorney for Sullivan County, New York

=== Tompkins County ===
- Georgia Hare (1913): First female lawyer in Tompkins County, New York

=== Ulster County ===
- Karen Peters: First female to a Judge of the Family Court in Ulster County, New York
- Deborah Schneer: First female to serve as a Judge of the Ulster County Court, New York (2009)
- Elizabeth Culmone-Mills: First female appointed as the Chief Assistant District Attorney for Ulster County, New York

=== Warren County ===
- Paulette Kershko: First female to win a countywide judge race in Warren County, New York (2015)

=== Wayne County ===
- Christine Callanan: First female District Attorney for Wayne County, New York (2025)

=== Westchester County ===
- Jeanine Pirro (1975): First female (and Lebanese American female) judge in Westchester County, New York. She was also the first female District Attorney in the same county.
- Maria Vazquez-Doles: First Hispanic American female elected to the Supreme Court in the Ninth Judicial District [Westchester County, New York]
- Nichelle Johnson Muhammad: First Muslim American (female) judge in Mount Vernon, Westchester County, New York (2016)
- Lissette Fernandez: First Latino American (female of Ecuadorian descent) judge in Peekskill, Westchester County, New York (2020)
- Elena Goldberg Velásquez: First Latino American (female) judge in Yonkers, Westchester County, New York (2020)

=== Wyoming County ===
- Charlotte Smallwood-Cook: First female District Attorney in Wyoming County, New York (1950-1953)

== See also ==
- List of first women lawyers and judges in the United States
- Timeline of women lawyers in the United States
- Women in law

== Other topics of interest ==
- List of first minority male lawyers and judges in the United States
- List of first minority male lawyers and judges in New York
