= Women's rights historic sites in New York City =

Overview of historic sites for women's rights in New York City

Women's rights historic sites in New York City are locales with historical connections to the women's rights movement. In March, 2008, the Government of New York City published an official map of one hundred and twenty historical sites and monuments in the borough of Manhattan.

== Listed sites ==
Manhattan Borough President Scott Stringer and his office developed the Women's Rights Historic Sites map to celebrate Women's History Month and to provide "a brief introduction to some of the extraordinary women" in the history of New York City who played significant roles in the US women's rights movement. The map was created by the office's Deputy Chief of Staff at the time, Pam Elam; Ken Nemchin provided the map's design. A printable version of the map is available on the Office of the Manhattan Borough President's website. The digital map can be accessed through the OMBP website or on Google Maps.

The following list was compiled by the Office of the Manhattan Borough President:

1. Emma Warren Roebling
  - Address: Brooklyn Tower on Brooklyn Bridge
  - Emily Warren Roebling, who led the completion of the work on the Brooklyn Bridge when her husband was injured, was honored with a plaque on the Brooklyn Tower of the bridge facing Manhattan. The plaque, donated by the Brooklyn Engineers Club, says: "Back of every great work we can find the self-sacrificing devotion of a woman."
2. Elizabeth Jennings
  - Address: Park Row between Spruce and Beekman
  - Elizabeth Jennings Place honors the woman who was forcibly ejected from a car on the Third Avenue Railway line at the corner of Pearl Street and Chatham Square. In 1854, Elizabeth Jennings became the first African-American woman to bring a successful lawsuit seeking to end discrimination on public transportation in New York City. This case occurred a century before Rosa Parks refused to give up her bus seat in Montgomery, Alabama.
3. Susan B. Anthony and Elizabeth Cady Stanton
  - Address: 37 Park Row
  - The street sign designating Susan B. Anthony and Elizabeth Cady Stanton Corner honors these women's rights leaders near the site where the office of their 1868 newspaper, The Revolution, once stood. Anthony said "Cautious, careful people always casting about to preserve their reputation or social standards never can bring about reform. Those who are really in earnest are willing to be anything or nothing in the world's estimation, and publicly and privately, in season and out, avow their sympathies with despised ideas and their advocates, and bear the consequences."
4. Barbara Ruckle Heck
  - Address: 44 John Street
  - In 1766, Barbara Ruckle Heck founded what is now the oldest Methodist congregation in United States at the Old John Street United Methodist Church.
5. Louise Nevelson
  - Address: Intersection of Maiden Lane, William Street and Liberty Street
  - Louise Nevelson Plaza with her sculptures entitled "Shadows and Flags" was dedicated on April 14, 1977.
6. Victoria Woodhull and Tennessee Clafin
  - Address: Stockbrokerage 44 Broad Street
  - Also see: Woodhull's home: 15 E. 38th Street
  - Victoria Woodhull and her sister Tennessee Clafin became the first women stockbrokers when they opened Woodhull, Clafin and Company in 1869. She also launched a newspaper, Woodhull & Clafin's Weekly, in 1870 and a campaign for President in 1872.
7. Ms. Foundation for Women
  - Address: 120 Wall Street
  - The Ms. Foundation for Women, founded in 1972 to support the efforts of women and girls to govern their own lives and influence the world around them, was the country's first national, multi-issue women's fund.
8. St. Elizabeth Ann Seton
  - Address: 7 State Street
  - From 1801 to 1804, St. Elizabeth Ann Seton lived in the James Watson House where her shrine is now located. Mother Seton became the first American-born saint of the Roman Catholic Church.
9. Emma Lazarus
  - Address: Home 18 West 10th Street
  - Also see: Statue of Liberty, Liberty Island
  - The Statue of Liberty was said to be modeled after the mother of French sculptor Frédéric Auguste Bartholdi. Emma Lazarus' poem "The New Colossus," which is inscribed on the statue's base, includes the famous words, "Give me your tired, your poor, your huddled masses yearning to breathe free." Lazarus is honored with a street sign, Emma Lazarus Place, near this site where she lived. She is also remembered by a plaque at the northwest end of Battery Park which was donated in 1955 by the Federation of Jewish Women's Organizations.
10. Annie Moore
  - Address: Ellis Island
  - The Annie Moore Statue on Ellis Island represents those who came to America looking for a better life. From 1892 to 1954, twelve million immigrants entered the United States through Ellis Island; more than a hundred million Americans can claim ancestors who came through Ellis Island. There were many Annie Moores and it took historians some time to correctly match the statue with the right biography of the immigrant she represents.
11. Billie Jean King
  - Address: 26 Broadway
  - The Billie Jean King International Women's Sports Center, honoring the tennis champion and women's rights activist, was opened in Lower Manhattan in 2008 as part of The Sports Museum of America.
12. Gertrude Ederle
  - Address: Broadway near Beaver Street
  - On August 27, 1926, Gertrude Ederle received a ticker tape parade to celebrate her accomplishment of becoming the first woman to swim the English Channel.
13. Amelia Earhart
  - Address: Broadway near Morris Street
  - Pilot Amelia Earhart was honored by two New York City ticker tape parades, the last being on June 20, 1932, to mark her achievement of the first solo transatlantic flight by a woman. Earhart said: "The most difficult thing is the decision to act, the rest is merely tenacity. The fears are paper tigers. You can do anything you decide to do. You can act to change and control your life; and the procedure, the process is its own reward."
14. Althea Gibson
  - Address: Broadway near Liberty Street
  - Althea Gibson, the first African-American to win a Wimbledon singles championship, became the first tennis player to be given a ticker tape parade by the City of New York on July 11, 1957, to honor her achievement. Gibson said: "I don't want to be put on a pedestal. I just want to be reasonably successful and live a normal life with all the conveniences to make it so. I think I've already got the main thing I've always wanted, which is to be somebody, to have identity. I'm Althea Gibson, the tennis champion. I hope it makes me happy."
15. Women's eNews
  - Address: 6 Barclay Street
  - Women's eNews, launched as an independent, international media outlet on January 1, 2002, is a primary source of news of particular concern to women and also provides women's perspectives on public policy issues. Founder and Editor-in-chief Rita Henley Jensen leads this nonprofit, Internet-based news service.
16. Mary Church Terrell and the National Association of Colored Women
  - Address: 9 Murray Street
  - Founded in 1896, the National Association of Colored Women worked for women's equality and helped women find employment. Mary Church Terrell, the Association's first National President, also played an important role in the fight for woman suffrage.
17. Diana Reyna
  - Address: Office 250 Broadway
  - New York City Council Member Diana Reyna was selected by the voters in 2001, thus becoming the first woman of Dominican heritage elected in New York City.
18. Carol Bellamy
  - Address: Office City Hall
  - Carol Bellamy was the first woman elected to citywide office in New York City when she became City Council President in 1977. After changes in the City Charter, the City Council President's position became known as Public Advocate.
19. Christine Quinn
  - Address: Office City Hall
  - Christine Quinn became the first woman, first openly Gay and first Irish- American Speaker of the New York City Council in January 2006.
20. Marie Sklowdowska Curie
  - Address: City Hall Park
  - Marie Sklodowska Curie, scientist and winner of two Nobel Prizes (Physics in 1903 and Chemistry in 1911), was honored by a stone in City Hall Park dedicated on November 7, 1934, on the 67th anniversary of her birth and donated by the Polish American Children of New York City. Marie Curie had died on July 4, 1934, of a blood disease which resulted from exposure during her research to large amounts of radiation.
21. Jane Addams
  - Address: City Hall Park
  - Jane Addams, leader of the settlement house movement and, in 1931, the first American woman to win the Nobel Peace prize, was honored by a stone in City Hall Park dedicated on Sept. 6, 1935. The stone was donated by the Women's International League for Peace and Freedom to commemorate the 75th birthday of its founder.
22. African Burial Ground National Monument
  - Address: corner of Elk and Duane Streets
  - It is estimated that 15,000 – 20,000 enslaved Africans were buried in the area around where City Hall now stands. In 1991, that cemetery was discovered, becoming one of America's most significant archeological finds of the 20th Century. In 2007, the African Burial Ground National Monument was dedicated. It is estimated that 40% of the adults buried there were women.
23. Constance Baker Motley
  - Address: Office Municipal Building 1 Centre Street
  - Constance Baker Motley became the first woman Borough President of Manhattan in 1965. She was also the first African-American woman elected to the New York State Senate (1964), the first African-American woman judge on the federal bench (Southern District of New York, 1966), and the first African-American woman to serve as Chief Judge (1982).
24. Elizabeth Holtzman
  - Address: Municipal Building, 1 Centre Street
  - Elizabeth Holtzman became the first woman Comptroller of New York City in 1990. She was also the youngest woman elected to Congress (1973) and the first woman to serve as Brooklyn's District Attorney.
25. Maya Lin
  - Address: United States Courthouse, Foley Square
  - In 1996, architect and sculptor Maya Lin created "Sounding Stones," four sequentially placed granite blocks, which mark the Worth and Pearl Street entrances to the United States Courthouse.
26. Jane Bolin
  - Address: Domestic Relations Court, 60 Lafayette Street
  - Jane Bolin was the first African-American woman in the United States to serve as a judge. On July 22, 1939, Mayor Fiorello La Guardia appointed her to serve on the New York City Domestic Relations Court, later renamed Family Court.
27. Doris Ling-Cohan
  - Address: New York Supreme Court 60 Centre Street
  - First elected to the New York Supreme Court in 2002, Doris Ling-Cohan, the daughter of Chinese immigrants, is the first Asian-American woman to serve as a Justice.
28. Sojourner Truth
  - Address: 340-344 Broadway
  - On September 7, 1853, at a Woman's Rights Convention at the now demolished Broadway Tabernacle, abolitionist and suffragist Sojourner Truth silenced hecklers by saying: "But we'll have our rights; see if we don't. And you can't stop us from them; see if you can. You may hiss as much as you like, but it is coming. Women don't get half as much rights as they ought to. We want more and we will have it."
29. Underground Railroad Station
  - Address: 36 Lispenard Street
  - The Underground Railroad Station at 36 Lispenard Street (plaque), one of the stops on the escape route to freedom, was where many found help from the New York City abolitionist community. Women comprised a major part of the abolitionist movement.
30. Catherine Ferguson
  - Address: School 51 Warren Street
  - Also see: Home 74 Thompson Street
  - Catherine Ferguson, a former slave, established an interracial Sunday school for poor and neglected children around 1793. Ferguson provided for the children with money she earned from baking cakes.
31. Women's Committee of the Gee How Oak Tin Association
  - Address: 62-64 Bayard Street
  - The Women's Committee of the Gee How Oak Tin Association was organized by Margaret Chin in Chinatown in March 2002. While the Association itself was formed in the 1920s, women who are daughters of Chin, Woo and Yuan families were only allowed to join the Association and vote in 2002 when the Women's Committee was formed.
32. Lillian Wald
  - Address: Settlement 263-267 Henry Street
  - Also see: Playground at Cherry, Gouverneur, Monroe and Montgomery Playground Madison, E 130th and 131st
  - In 1893, social reformer Lillian Wald pioneered the concept of public health nursing for the poor when she created what would become the Visiting Nurse Service of New York and in 1895 she founded the Henry Street Settlement to serve the community. Two Manhattan playgrounds have been named for Lillian Wald.
33. Nydia Velázquez
  - Address: Office 173 Avenue B
  - In 1992, Nydia Velázquez became the first Puerto Rican woman elected to the United States House of Representatives. The 12th Congressional District, which she represents, includes the Lower East Side of Manhattan.
34. Dorothy Day
  - Address: 55 East Third Street
  - Peace and social justice activist Dorothy Day's home, Maryhouse, was at 55 East Third Street.
35. Pat Eng & New York Asian Women's Center
  - Address: 32 Broadway, 10th Floor
  - The New York Asian Women's Center was founded in 1982 by women who recognized that Asian immigrant women had nowhere to turn when faced with domestic violence. Led by Founding Executive Director, Pat Eng, NYAWC was the first Asian organization in the city to include the word "women" in its name.
36. Dr. Elizabeth Blackwell
  - Address: Infirmary 64 Bleecker Street
  - In 1849, Dr. Elizabeth Blackwell became the first woman in the United States to receive a medical degree (Geneva Medical College). On May 12, 1857, the 37th Birthday of her friend Florence Nightingale, she opened the New York Infirmary for Indigent Women and Children (the first hospital staffed by women serving women) with her sister, Dr. Emily Blackwell, and Dr. Marie Zakrzewska. In 1868, she founded the Women's Medical College of the New York Infirmary to train other women. Blackwell said: "For what is done or learned by one class of women becomes, by virtue of their common womanhood, the property of all women."
37. Eve Addams' Tea Room
  - Address: 129 MacDougal Street
  - New York City's first Lesbian bar was said to be Eve Addams' Tea Room, founded in 1925.
38. Susan Glaspell
  - Address: 133 MacDougal Street
  - Pulitzer Prize–winning writer Susan Glaspell's plays were presented at Eva Le Gallienne's Civic Repertory Theatre starting in 1927 as well as the Provincetown Playhouse.
39. Barbara Gittings & Daughters of Bilitis
  - Address: 30 Charleton Street
  - The New York City Chapter of the Daughters of Bilitis, a Lesbian Rights group, was organized in 1958 by Barbara Gittings and others.
40. Berenice Abbott
  - Address: 50 Commerce Street
  - Photographer Berenice Abbott lived with Elizabeth McCausland. Abbott's landmark photo collection, Changing New York, appeared in 1939. Abbott wrote, "The tempo of the metropolis is not of eternity, nor even time, but of the vanishing instant."
41. Edna St. Vincent Millay
  - Address: 75 ½ Bedford Street
  - In 1923, Edna St. Vincent Millay became the first woman to win the Pulitzer Prize in Poetry. Family lore has it that Millay was named after St. Vincent's Hospital because the life of her Mother's brother was saved by the medical staff there. Millay wrote: "My candle burns at both ends; It will not last the night; But ah, my foes and oh, my friends – It gives a lovely light!"
42. Willa Cather
  - Address: Plaque 5 Bank Street
  - Writer Willa Cather lived with Edith Lewis at several locations in the West Village over the years, and there is also a plaque dedicated to the Pulitzer Prize–winning author.
43. Diane Arbus
  - Address: 55 Bethune Street
  - Photographer Diane Arbus committed suicide at her Westbeth apartment in July 1971. Arbus said: "Nothing is ever the same as they said it was. It's what I've never seen before that I recognize."
44. Jane Jacobs
  - Address: 555 Hudson Street
  - Author and activist Jane Jacobs lived at 555 Hudson Street. Her 1961 landmark book, "The Death and Life of Great American Cities," literally and figuratively changed the landscape of urban America.
45. Gertrude Vanderbilt Whitney and Julianna Force
  - Address: 8 West 8th Street
  - Gertrude Vanderbilt Whitney and Julianna Force created the Whitney Museum of American Art with Whitney as the sculptor and art patron and Force as the Museum Director. Its first location is now the New York Studio School of Drawing, Painting and Sculpture.
46. Triangle Shirtwaist Factory Fire
47. Frances Perkins
  - Address: 23-29 Washington Place at Greene Street
  - The Triangle Shirtwaist Factory Fire killed 146 women and girls on Saturday, March 25, 1911, just before closing time. Most of the stairway exits were locked or jammed as workers tried to flee the fire which engulfed the top three floors of the building. This tragedy, and the public outcry after it, forced government leaders to propose new worker safety measures. The owners of the Triangle Company were never held responsible for the deaths of the workers or the injuries to those who survived. Witnessing the tragedy at the Triangle Shirtwaist Factory in 1911 made Frances Perkins rededicate her life to improving working conditions for all people. Perkins became the first woman cabinet member when President Franklin Delano Roosevelt appointed her as Secretary of Labor in 1933. Perkins said: "The door might not be opened to a woman again for a long, long time and I had a kind of duty to other women to walk in and sit down on the chair that was offered, and so establish the right of others long hence and far distant in geography to sit in the high seats."
48. Bella Abzug
  - Address: 2 Fifth Avenue
  - Congresswoman Bella Abzug, whose legislation made possible the 1977 National Women's Conference in Houston, Texas. Abzug said: "No matter how steep the passage and discouraging the pace, I ask you never to give in and never give up."
49. Eleanor Roosevelt
  - Address: Apt 20 East 11th Street
  - Eleanor Roosevelt's apartment was in a building owned by her friends Esther Lape and Elizabeth Fisher Read; a plaque is on the building. Born in New York City on October 11, 1884, Roosevelt had a number of residences throughout the years, but the apartment on East 11th Street may have been her favorite. First Lady and United States Delegate to the United Nations, Roosevelt was the person most responsible for the United Nations' adoption of the Universal Declaration of Human Rights. Eleanor Roosevelt said, "Where, after all, do universal human rights begin? In small places, close to home - so close and so small that they cannot be seen on any maps of the world. Yet they are the world of the individual persons; the neighborhood…the school…the factory, farm or office…Such are the places where every man, woman and child seeks equal justice, equal opportunity, equal dignity without discrimination. Unless these rights have meaning there, they have little meaning anywhere."
50. Eva Le Gallienne
  - Address: Theater 105 West 14th Street
  - Also see: Home 224 West 11th Street
  - In 1926, actor and director Eva Le Gallienne created the Civic Repertory Theatre and thereby launched the off-Broadway movement to present repertory theatre to those who could not afford Broadway prices. Le Gallienne shared a home with Civic Rep member Josephine Hutchinson.
51. Margaret Sanger
  - Address: Clinic 17 West 16th Street
  - Also see: American Birth Control League 104 Fifth Avenue; Margaret Sanger Square 26 Bleecker Street
  - Margaret Sanger's residence and the office of the Birth Control Clinical Research Bureau were at 17 West 16th Street. The office of the American Birth Control League was at 104 Fifth Avenue. Margaret Sanger Square is the present home of Planned Parenthood of New York City. Sanger wrote: "The basic freedom of the world is woman's freedom…No woman can call herself free who does not own and control her body. No woman can call herself free until she can choose consciously whether she will or will not be a mother."
52. Harriot Stanton Blatch
  - Address: Office 32 Union Square
  - Elizabeth Cady Stanton's daughter, Harriot Stanton Blatch, carried on her Mother's fight for equality. Blatch was one of the leaders of the woman suffrage campaign in New York State and worked for the vote.
53. Mary Pickford
  - Address: Biograph Film Company 11 East 14th Street
  - Also see: Home 270 Riverside Drive
  - Mary Pickford became a movie star with the Biograph Film Company; she lived at 270 Riverside Drive at 99th Street. She went on to be one of the most influential businesswomen of her time.
54. Deborah Glick
  - Address: Office 853 Broadway
  - In 1990, Deborah Glick was elected as the first openly Lesbian or Gay member of the New York State Legislature.
55. Emma Goldman
  - Address: 210 East 13th Street
  - Anarchist Emma Goldman's residence was where, starting in 1906, she published the magazine, Mother Earth (plaque on building). Goldman was deported from the United States (Ellis Island) to the Soviet Union aboard the S.S. Buford on December 21, 1919.
56. St. Maria Frances Cabrini
  - Address: Cabrini Medical Center 227 East 19th Street
  - Francesca S. Cabrini, who in 1946 became the first naturalized American to be canonized, relocated to New York City in 1889 to minister to the growing number of impoverished immigrants. In 1892, she established a small hospital which eventually grew into the Cabrini Medical Center.
57. Women's Trade Union League
  - Address: Office 43 East 22nd Street
  - The Women's Trade Union League, founded in 1903, included women workers and their middle-class allies. The League investigated women's working conditions and promoted the creation of women's trade unions.
58. Elizabeth Phelps & National Woman Suffrage Association
  - Address: 49 East 23rd Street
  - A house purchased by Elizabeth Stuart Phelps became known as the "Women's Bureau" because so many women's groups met at that location. In 1869, The National Woman Suffrage Association was formed there and also in 1869, Susan B. Anthony, who devoted her life to the fight for women's equality, moved the office of The Revolution to the first floor of the "Women's Bureau."
59. Clara Driscoll and the Tiffany Girls
  - Address: 102 East 25th Street
  - In 1892 and the years that followed, Clara Driscoll and the Tiffany Girls worked at Tiffany Studios designing, cutting and making Tiffany lamps, windows, mosaics, enamels and ceramics.
60. Caterina Jarboro
  - Address: New York Hippodrome 756 Sixth Avenue
  - In 1933, twenty-two years before Marian Anderson's debut at the Metropolitan Opera, Caterina Jarboro, the daughter of a Native American Mother and an African-American Father, made her New York City debut when the Chicago Opera Company appeared at the New York Hippodrome.
61. Ladies' Mile Historic District
  - Address: Broadway from 8th to 23rd Streets
  - New York City has honored the shopping that women do with the designation of the Ladies' Mile Historic District on Broadway from 8th to 23rd Streets. The sign marking the District is at Broadway and 23rd Street.
62. Audre Lorde
  - Address: Callen-Lorde Community Health Center 356 West 18th Street
  - Poet Audre Lorde, the daughter of Grenadian immigrants, was born in New York City in 1934. Her writing documented everything from the fight against racism, sexism and homophobia to her battle with breast cancer. She was designated as New York State's Poet Laureate in 1991. Lorde died in 1992 and the Callen-Lorde Community Health Center honors her memory.
63. Edith Wharton
  - Address: childhood home 14 West 23rd Street
  - Author Edith Wharton's childhood home was at 14 West 23rd Street. In 1921, Wharton's novel, The Age of Innocence, won a Pulitzer Prize.
64. Women's City Club of New York
  - Address: 307 Seventh Avenue
  - The Women's City Club of New York was founded in 1915 before women had the right to vote. Since its beginnings, the Women's City Club has focused on getting women involved in the political process through policy debates on issues that affect their lives.
65. Carrie Chapman Catt & National American Woman Suffrage Association
  - Address: 171 Madison Avenue
  - Carrie Chapman Catt and others led the fight for votes for women in the New York Headquarters of the National American Woman Suffrage Association; the editorial office of the publication "The Woman Citizen" was also at that location. Catt wrote about the long battle for the vote: "Hundreds of women gave the accumulated possibilities of an entire lifetime, thousands gave years of their lives, hundreds of thousands gave constant interest and such aid as they could. It was a continuous, seemingly endless, chain of activity. Young suffragists who helped forge the last links of that chain were not born when it began. Old suffragists who forged the first links were dead when it ended."
66. Mary Lindley Murray
  - Address: Plaque Park Avenue and East 37th Street
  - Also see: Home 16 Park Avenue
  - In 1776, hostess Mary Lindley Murray entertained British officers at her home long enough for the American troops to escape. A stone was dedicated at Park Avenue and 37th Street in 1903 by the Daughters of the American Revolution to mark Murray's service to her country.
67. Gloria Steinem & Ms. Magazine
  - Address: 370 Lexington Avenue
  - Gloria Steinem and co-workers created Ms. Magazine in 1971 when it first appeared as an insert in the December issue of New York Magazine. The first independent issue of Ms. was published in Spring 1972 by Majority Enterprises, Inc. Steinem said: "Women may be the one group that grows more radical with age."
68. Hillary Clinton
  - Address: Victory Party East 42nd and Lexington Avenue
  - Hillary Rodham Clinton was elected as New York's first woman United States Senator on November 7, 2000; her election night victory party was held at the Grand Hyatt Hotel.
69. Gertrude Stein
  - Address: Bryant Park, West 42nd between 5th and 6th Avenues
  - Writer and poet Gertrude Stein's statue is in Bryant Park behind the New York Public Library.
70. Josephine Shaw Lowell
  - Address: Bryant Park, 6th Avenue between 40th and 41st streets
  - There is a Memorial Fountain honoring social worker Josephine Shaw Lowell in Bryant Park; it was dedicated on May 21, 1912. She was the first woman honored by a monument in NYC.
71. New York Liberty Basketball
  - Address: Madison Square Garden 7th Avenue btwn West 31st and 33rd Streets
  - The first home game of the New York Liberty of the Women's National Basketball Association (WNBA) was played at Madison Square Garden on June 29, 1997. The Liberty defeated Phoenix 65-57 before a crowd of 17,780 women's basketball fans.
72. Ana Oliveira & the New York Women's Foundation
  - Address: 434 West 33rd Street
  - The New York Women's Foundation was established in 1987 as a voice for women and a force for change. The Foundation's vision combines hands-on philanthropy with community-driven projects addressing the needs of low-income women and girls. The New York Women's Foundation is led by President and CEO Ana Oliveira.
73. Golda Meir
  - Address: 1411 Broadway at 39th Street
  - Golda Meir, the former leader of Israel, was honored with a statue at Golda Meir Square near the entrance to 1411 Broadway.
74. League for Political Education
  - Address: The Town Hall, 123 West 43rd Street
  - The Town Hall was founded by members of the League for Political Education: Eleanor Butler Sanders, Lee Wood Haggin, Catherine Abbe, Laura Day, Adele M. Fielde and Dr. Mary Putnam Jacobi. The League, a pro-woman suffrage group, wanted to create a meeting space to help educate people on important issues. Town Hall opened in January 1921, a few months after the 19th "Votes for Women" Amendment to the Constitution had been ratified on August 26, 1920.
75. Dorothy Parker
  - Address: Algonquin Round Table 59 West 44th Street
  - Author and poet Dorothy Parker became famous for her wit in discussions at the Algonquin Round Table (Algonquin Hotel). Parker wrote: "By the time you swear you're his, Shivering and sighing, And he vows his passion is Infinite, undying – Lady, make a note of this: One of you is lying."
76. Lorraine Hansberry
  - Address: Ethel Barrymore Theatre 243 West 47th Street
  - On March 11, 1959, "A Raisin in the Sun" by playwright Lorraine Hansberry opened at the Ethel Barrymore Theatre. It was the first play by a Black woman ever to appear on Broadway.
77. Chita Rivera
  - Address: Winter Garden Theater 1634 Broadway
  - Broadway legend Chita Rivera rocketed to stardom in 1957 when West Side Story opened on September 26 at the Winter Garden Theater.
78. Phylicia Rashad
  - Address: Radio City Music Hall Avenue of the Americas at 49th Street
  - On June 6, 2004, at the Tony Award Ceremonies held in Radio City Music Hall, the Tony Award for leading actress in a play went to Phylicia Rashad. She was the first African-American woman to win that award.
79. Toni Morrison
  - Address: Random House 1745 Broadway
  - Author Toni Morrison, the first African-American woman to win the Nobel Prize for Literature (1993), worked for twenty years as a senior editor at the New York City Headquarters of Random House. Morrison said: "My work requires me to think about how free I can be as an African-American woman writer in my genderized, sexualized, wholly racialized world."
80. Abby Aldrich Rockefeller, Lillie P. Bliss and Mary Quinn Sullivan
  - Address: 11 West 53rd Street
  - The Museum of Modern Art was founded in 1929 by Abby Aldrich Rockefeller, Lillie P. Bliss and Mary Quinn Sullivan.
81. Katharine Hepburn
82. Greta Garbo
  - Addresses: 244 East 49th Street and 450 East 52nd Street
  - Film icons Katharine Hepburn and Greta Garbo made New York City home for most of their lives; Hepburn's townhouse was 244 East 49th Street and Garbo lived on the fifth floor of 450 East 52nd Street. Katharine Hepburn Garden at Dag Hammarskjold Plaza was dedicated on May 12, 1997.
83. Georgia O'Keeffe
  - Address: 525 Lexington Avenue
  - Artist Georgia O'Keeffe lived in a 2-room suite on the 28th floor of the Shelton Hotel. O'Keefe painted many of her New York City scenes from this location. O'Keeffe said: "One can't paint New York as it is, but rather as it is felt."
84. Muriel Siebert
  - Address: Muriel Siebert and Company 885 Third Avenue
  - Muriel Siebert, who in 1967 became the first woman to have a seat on the New York Stock Exchange, today runs the woman-owned brokerage firm, Muriel Siebert and Company.
85. Martha Graham
  - Address: Studio 316 East 63rd Street
  - Also see: Home 430 east 63rd Street
  - Dancer and choreographer Martha Graham helped create the modern dance movement and ran a Studio and School of Contemporary Dance.
86. Sara Delano Roosevelt
  - Address: 47-49 East 65th Street
  - Also see: Park at Chrystie Street
  - The Sara Delano Roosevelt House is at 47 - 49 East 65 Street and a park named for the mother of President Franklin Delano Roosevelt is on the Lower East Side at Chrystie Street.
87. Rosalyn Yalow
  - Address: Hunter College East 68th Street and Lexington Avenue
  - In 1977, Rosalyn Yalow became the first American woman to win the Nobel Prize for Medicine. She graduated from Hunter College at East 68th Street and Lexington Avenue in 1941.
88. Pura Belpre
  - Address: Center for Puerto Rican Studies at Hunter College East 68th Street and Lexington Avenue
  - Pura Belpre, was the first Puerto Rican librarian in the New York Public Library system. Through her work, the Library's 115th Street branch became a cultural center for the Latino residents of New York City. Belpre was also an author and folklorist. Archives containing her work can be found at the Center for Puerto Rican Studies at Hunter College.
89. Geraldine Ferraro
  - Address: Marymount College 221 East 71st Street
  - In 1984, Congresswoman Geraldine Ferraro became the first woman in United States history nominated to the Presidential ticket of a major political party. Democratic Party Presidential candidate Walter Mondale selected Ferraro to be his Vice President on July 12, 1984. Geraldine Ferraro graduated in 1956 with a B.A. from Marymount College.
90. Louise Elder Havemeyer
  - Address: Metropolitan Museum of Art 5th Avenue and 81st Street
  - At her death in 1929, suffragist and art collector Louise Elder Havemeyer donated her vast collection of impressionist art, collected under the guidance of painter Mary Cassatt, to the Metropolitan Museum of Art. This donation moved the museum to the forefront of the art world.
91. Julia de Burgos
  - Address: Mosaic 106th Street between Lexington and Third Avenue
  - Julia de Burgos Boulevard runs on East 106th Street from Fifth to First Avenues and a mosaic portrait of the poet is located at 106th Street between Lexington and Third Avenues. Born in Puerto Rico in 1914, Julia de Burgos also worked as a journalist in New York City, but it is her poems which continue to attract new generations of readers.
92. Brenda Berkman
  - Address: Randall's Island FDNY Training Academy
  - Thanks to a successful lawsuit by Brenda Berkman initiated in 1978, the New York City Fire Department had to open its doors to women firefighters. Berkman and 40 other women entered the FDNY Training Academy on Randall's Island in 1982.
93. Statues of Fictitious Female Characters
  - Address: Central Park
  - In New York City, statues represent Mother Goose (1938; Central Park), Alice of Alice in Wonderland (1959; Central Park) and Juliet Capulet (with Romeo) of Romeo and Juliet (1977; Central Park), but few real women are so honored.
94. Emma Stebbins
  - Address: Central Park
  - Emma Stebbins' sculpture, Angel of the Waters Statue, at Bethesda Fountain in Central Park was dedicated on May 31, 1873. Stebbins was the first woman artist to receive a commission for a major work in New York City.
95. Jacqueline Kennedy Onassis
  - Address: Central Park Reservoir
  - In 1994, the Central Park Reservoir was renamed in honor of former First Lady Jacqueline Kennedy Onassis. Signs were unveiled in 2003 in recognition of her appreciation of Central Park and the city that surrounds it.
96. Betty Friedan
  - Address: 72nd Street and Central Park West
  - Betty Friedan, author of The Feminine Mystique in 1963 and one of the founders of the National Organization for Women in 1966, lived for a time at The Dakota apartment building. Friedan wrote: "The problem that has no name – which is simply the fact that American women are kept from growing to their full human capacities – is taking a far greater toll on the physical and mental health of our country than any known disease…Who knows what women can be when they are finally free to become themselves?"
97. Maria Tallchief
  - Address: New York City Ballet 20 Lincoln Center
  - Maria Tallchief, a Native American, became a prima ballerina with the New York City Ballet and performed on and off there from 1948 to 1965. The New York City Ballet's home was the City Center for Music and Dance during most of that period. Since 1964, the NYCB has been located at the New York State Theater.
98. Tania Leon
  - Address: New York Philharmonic 10 Lincoln Center Plaza
  - Internationally known composer and conductor Tania Leon worked from 1993 to 1997 as New Music Advisor with the New York Philharmonic at Avery Fisher Hall.
99. Barbara Walters
  - Address: ABC News 7 West 66th Street
  - Barbara Walters joined ABC News in 1976 as the first woman to co-host the network news. Prior to joining ABC, she appeared on NBC's Today Show for 15 years. NBC only officially designated her as the program's first woman co-host in 1974. In 1964, Marlene Sanders became the first woman to anchor a nightly newscast for a major network, ABC, when the male anchor lost his voice and Sanders replaced him for an evening.
100. Eleanor Roosevelt
  - Address: Statue Riverside Park at West 72nd Street
  - Also see: 20 East 11th Street
  - Eleanor Roosevelt's statue is in Riverside Park in the Eleanor Roosevelt Memorial Plaza. It was dedicated on October 5, 1996, and donated by the Eleanor Roosevelt Monument Fund.
101. Margaret Mead
  - Address: Theodore Roosevelt Park, Museum of Natural History Central Park West at 79th Street
  - Margaret Mead Green in the northwestern section of Theodore Roosevelt Park and the Margaret Mead Hall of Pacific Peoples honor the anthropologist and author who, in 1964, was promoted to curator at the Museum of Natural History.
102. Diana Ross
  - Address: Playground Central Park West and 81st Street
  - Singer Diana Ross is honored with a children's playground in her name.
103. Billie Holiday
  - Address: Home 26 West 87th Street
  - The home of singer Billie Holiday was at 26 West 87th Street.
104. Lesbian Herstory Archives
  - Address: 215 West 92nd Street
  - The Lesbian Herstory Archives was founded in the spring of 1974 by Joan Nestle and Deborah Edel in their apartment.
105. Joan of Arc
  - Address: Statue Riverside Drive and West 93rd Street
  - The Joan of Arc statue by Anna Hyatt was dedicated on December 6, 1915, and donated by the Joan of Arc Statue Committee.
106. Elizabeth Cady Stanton
  - Address: 250 West 94th Street
  - The apartment where women's rights leader Elizabeth Cady Stanton died in 1902 has been renamed in Stanton's honor and a plaque appears near the entrance. Stanton led the organizing effort for the 1848 Seneca Falls Woman's Rights Convention which launched the fight for women's equality in the United States. Stanton said of her partnership with Susan B. Anthony: "So closely interwoven have been our lives, our purposes and experiences that, separated, we have a feeling of incompleteness – united, such strength of self-assertion that no ordinary obstacles, differences, or dangers ever appear to us insurmountable."
107. Marian Anderson
  - Address: Home 1200 Fifth Avenue and 101st Street
  - Marian Anderson's home, where she lived from 1958 to 1975, is marked with a plaque. On January 7, 1955, she became the first African-American singer to perform as a member of the Metropolitan Opera. The opera was Verdi's Un ballo in maschera. Anderson said: "As long as you keep a person down, some part of you has to be down there to hold him down, so it means you cannot soar as you otherwise might."
108. Ruth Bader Ginsburg
  - Address: Columbia Law School 435 West 116th Street
  - Prior to her appointment to the United States Court of Appeals in 1980 and to the United States Supreme Court in 1993, Justice Ruth Bader Ginsburg co-founded the Women's Rights Project of the American Civil Liberties Union in 1972. That same year, Professor Ginsburg became the first woman to receive tenure at Columbia Law School.
109. Chien-Shiung Wu
  - Address: Columbia University 2960 Broadway at 116th Street
  - Chien-Shiung Wu was a pioneering physicist who, through her research and teaching, helped change the accepted view of the structure of the Universe. She became a full professor at Columbia University in 1958.
110. Zora Neale Hurston
  - Address: Barnard College 3009 Broadway at 117th Street
  - In 1928, writer, folklorist and anthropologist Zora Neale Hurston became the first African-American woman to graduate Barnard College. Hurston said: "Sometimes I feel discriminated against, but it does not make me angry. It merely astonishes me. How can any deny themselves the pleasure of my company? It's beyond me."
111. Shirley Chisholm
  - Address: Teachers College 525 West 120th Street
  - In 1968, Shirley Chisholm became the first Black woman elected to Congress; she served in the House of Representatives from 1969 to 1983. In 1972, Chisholm was the first Black woman to run for President of the United States, winning 151 delegates at the Democratic National Convention. In 1952 Chisholm received an M.A. from Columbia University. Shirley Chisholm said: "Of my two ‘handicaps,' being female put more obstacles in my path than being black."
112. Harriet Tubman
  - Address: Statue West 122nd Street and Frederick Douglass Boulevard
  - The Harriet Tubman Memorial honors the woman who led over 300 slaves to freedom. Tubman never lost a passenger as a conductor on the Underground Railroad. She said, "I had reasoned this out in my mind… two things I had a right to, liberty and death. If I could not have one, I would have the other, for no man should take me alive."
113. Betty Lee Sung
  - Address: City College of New York, Convent Avenue between 131st and 141st Street
  - In 1967, author and historian Betty Lee Sung wrote Mountain of Gold: The Story of the Chinese in America; in 1970, she founded the Asian-American Studies Program at the City College of New York, one of the first such programs in the nation.
114. Sadie and Bessie Delany
  - Address: Office 2305 Seventh Avenue at 135th Street
  - In 1993, the oral history account of the lives of Sadie and Bessie Delany became a bestselling book, "Having Our Say: The Delany Sisters' First 100 Years." After Bessie Delany graduated from Columbia University on June 6, 1923, she shared a dental practice with her brother, Hap.
115. Ruby Dee
  - Address: 137th Street and 7th Avenue
  - Civil rights activist, actor and poet Ruby Dee's childhood home was the Ranceley apartment building. In a poem, Dee wrote: "Calling all sisters. Calling all righteous sisters. Calling all women. To steal away to our secret place. Have a meeting face to face. Look at the facts and determine our pace. Calling all women."
116. Florence Mills
  - Address: 220 West 135th Street
  - The Florence Mills House was the home of the entertainer who fought against racial inequality.
117. Madam C.J. Walker
  - Address: Countee Cullen Library 108-110 West 136th Street
  - The original site of Madam C.J. Walker's townhouse is now the Countee Cullen Library. In later years, her daughter, A'Lelia Walker, made the house a cultural salon during the Harlem Renaissance. Sarah Breedlove, later known as Madam C.J. Walker, is thought to be the first American woman self-made millionaire. She was also a philanthropist who donated money to groups working for racial equality. Madam Walker said: "I am a woman who came from the cotton fields of the South. From there I was promoted to the washtub. From there I was promoted to the cook kitchen. And from there I promoted myself into the business of manufacturing hair goods and preparations… I have built my own factory on my own ground."
118. Ida B. Wells
  - Address: 230 West 136 Street
  - In 1892, Ida B. Wells came to New York City and began a national anti-lynching crusade as a writer for the newspaper New York Age. Unable to return to Memphis where the office of her newspaper, Free Speech, had been destroyed by a mob of white men, Wells lectured and organized anti-lynching societies in the North. Wells also worked for woman suffrage.
119. Margaret Corbin
  - Address: 190th Street and Fort Washington Avenue
  - The first American woman to take a soldier's part in the war for liberty in 1776, Margaret Corbin, is honored by a plaque. Margaret Corbin Circle, at the entrance and drive of Fort Tryon Park, also commemorates her Revolutionary War heroics.

== See also ==
- Women's Rights National Historical Park
