= List of first women lawyers and judges in the United States =

This list of the first women lawyers and judges in each state of the United States includes the years in which the women were admitted to practice law. Also included are women of other distinctions, such as the first in their states to graduate from law school.

== Firsts nationwide ==
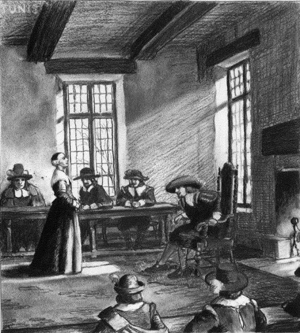
Margaret Brent: first woman to act as an attorney in the United States (1648)

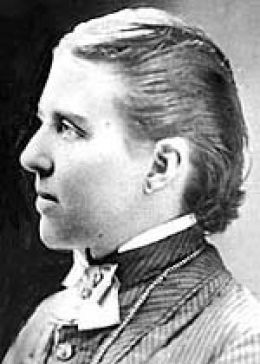
Arabella Mansfield: first woman admitted to practice law in the United States (1869)

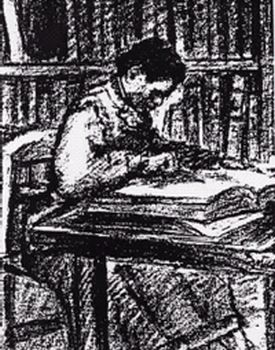
Charlotte E. Ray: First African American female lawyer in the United States and Washington, D.C. (1872)

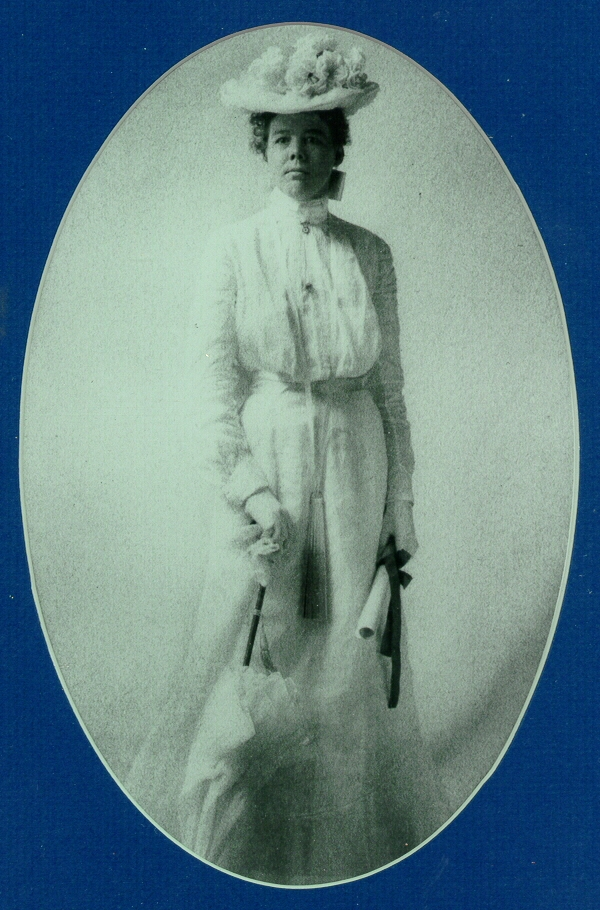
Lyda Conley: First Native American female lawyer in the United States (1902)

=== Law school ===
See Law school in the United States

=== Lawyers ===
See Women in law

==== Lawyers and the U.S. Supreme Court ====
See Women in law

=== Law clerks ===
- First female to clerk for the U.S. Court of Appeals: Carmel “Kim” Prashker Ebb in 1945
- First female to clerk for the U.S. Court of Appeals for the Fourth Circuit: Doris Gray
- First African American female to clerk for the U.S. Court of Appeals for Veterans Claims: Janene D. Jackson

See also Lists of law clerks of the Supreme Court of the United States

=== State judges ===
See Women in the United States judiciary

=== Federal judges ===
See Women in the United States judiciary

=== Attorneys General of the U.S. ===
See United States Attorney General

=== Deputy Attorney General of the U.S. ===
- First female: Carol E. Dinkins (1971) in 1984

=== Associate Attorney General of the U.S. ===
- First female: Rachel Brand from 2017-2018
- First Asian American female: Vanita Gupta in 2021

=== Solicitor General of the U.S. ===
- First female (acting): Barbara Underwood (1969) in 2001
- First female: Elena Kagan (1986) from 2009-2010

=== Deputy Solicitor General of the U.S. ===
- First (African American) female: Jewel Lafontant (1946) in 1973

=== Assistant Attorney General of the U.S. ===
- First females: Annette Abbott Adams (1912) and Mabel Walker Willebrandt (1917) from 1920-1921 and 1921-1929 respectively
- First Asian American female: Rose Ochi in 1997

=== State Attorneys General ===
- First female: Anne X. Alpern (1927) in 1959
- First female (elected): Arlene Violet (1974) in 1985
- First Mexican American female: Patricia A. Madrid (1973) in 1999
- First African American female: Pamela Carter in 1993
- First Asian American (female): Kamala Harris (1989) from 2011-2017
- First openly lesbian female: Maura Healey (1998) in 2015

=== State Solicitor General ===
- First Muslim Arab American (female): Fadwa Hammoud in 2019

=== United States Attorney ===
- First female: Annette Abbott Adams (1912) from 1918-1920
- First female to serve a full-term: Virginia Dill McCarty (1977) from 1977-1981
- First openly lesbian female: Jenny Durkan (1986) in 2009
- First Asian American female: Debra Wong Yang (1986) from 2002-2006
- First Native American (Hopi) female Diane Humetewa (1993) in 2007
- First Muslim (female): Saima Mohsin in 2021

=== Assistant United States Attorney ===
- First female: Annette Abbott Adams (1912) from 1914-1918
- First African American female: Jewel Lafontant (1946) from 1955-1958
- First known quadriplegic female: Holly Caudill in 1995

=== Special Assistant U.S. Attorney ===
- First female: Mary Grace Quackenbos Humiston (1904) in 1906

=== State Assistant Attorney General ===
- First female: Ella Knowles Haskell (1888) in 1893
- First African American female: Helen Elsie Austin (1930) in 1937

=== State District Attorneys ===
- First female: Edna C. Plummer (1907) in 1918
- First African American female: Anne Elise Thompson in 1975
- First openly lesbian female: Bonnie Dumanis (1977) in 2002
- First Dominican American (female): Camelia Valdes in 2009
- First Korean American (female): Grace H. Park in 2013
- First Puerto Rican female: Deborah González in 2020

=== State Deputy District Attorney ===
- First female: Clara Shortridge Foltz (1878) in 1910

=== Federal Bar Associations ===
- First (African American) female to co-found a coed national bar association: Gertrude Rush (1918) in 1925
- First female president (Federal Bar Association): Marguerite Rawalt in 1943
- First Asian American (female) president (Federal Bar Association): Anh Le Kremer
- First female vice-president (National Bar Association): Georgia Jones Ellis in 1929
- First female president (National Bar Association): Arnette Hubbard in 1981
- First Jewish female admitted (American Bar Association): Clarice Baright (1905) in 1919
- First African American female president (National Association of Women Lawyers): Mahala Ashley Dickerson in 1983

See also List of presidents of the American Bar Association

=== State Bar Association ===
- First (African American) female to lead coed state bar: Gertrude Rush (1918) in 1921
- First female president of voluntary state bar: Carole Bellows in 1977
- First female president of mandatory/integrated state bar: Donna Willard-Jones from 1979-1980
- First open lesbian to serve as president of a statewide bar association: Joan Ellenbogen in 1980
- First Latino American female president: Mary Torres in 2002
- First Korean American female president: Esther H. Lim in 2018
- First South Asian female president: Sunitha Anjilvel in 2024

== Firsts in individual states ==
- List of first women lawyers and judges in Alabama
- List of first women lawyers and judges in Alaska
- List of first women lawyers and judges in Arizona
- List of first women lawyers and judges in Arkansas
- List of first women lawyers and judges in California
- List of first women lawyers and judges in Colorado
- List of first women lawyers and judges in Connecticut
- List of first women lawyers and judges in Delaware
- List of first women lawyers and judges in Florida
- List of first women lawyers and judges in Georgia
- List of first women lawyers and judges in Hawaii
- List of first women lawyers and judges in Idaho
- List of first women lawyers and judges in Illinois
- List of first women lawyers and judges in Indiana
- List of first women lawyers and judges in Iowa
- List of first women lawyers and judges in Kansas
- List of first women lawyers and judges in Kentucky
- List of first women lawyers and judges in Louisiana
- List of first women lawyers and judges in Maine
- List of first women lawyers and judges in Maryland
- List of first women lawyers and judges in Massachusetts
- List of first women lawyers and judges in Michigan
- List of first women lawyers and judges in Minnesota
- List of first women lawyers and judges in Mississippi
- List of first women lawyers and judges in Missouri
- List of first women lawyers and judges in Montana
- List of first women lawyers and judges in Nebraska
- List of first women lawyers and judges in Nevada
- List of first women lawyers and judges in New Hampshire
- List of first women lawyers and judges in New Jersey
- List of first women lawyers and judges in New Mexico
- List of first women lawyers and judges in New York
- List of first women lawyers and judges in North Carolina
- List of first women lawyers and judges in North Dakota
- List of first women lawyers and judges in Ohio
- List of first women lawyers and judges in Oklahoma
- List of first women lawyers and judges in Oregon
- List of first women lawyers and judges in Pennsylvania
- List of first women lawyers and judges in Rhode Island
- List of first women lawyers and judges in South Carolina
- List of first women lawyers and judges in South Dakota
- List of first women lawyers and judges in Tennessee
- List of first women lawyers and judges in Texas
- List of first women lawyers and judges in Utah
- List of first women lawyers and judges in Vermont
- List of first women lawyers and judges in Virginia
- List of first women lawyers and judges in Washington
- List of first women lawyers and judges in West Virginia
- List of first women lawyers and judges in Wisconsin
- List of first women lawyers and judges in Wyoming

== Firsts in Washington, D.C. ==
- List of first women lawyers and judges in Washington D.C.

== Firsts in the U.S. territories ==
- List of first women lawyers and judges in U.S. territories

== See also ==
- List of the first women holders of political offices in the United States
- Timeline of women lawyers in the United States
- Women in law

== Other topics of interest ==
- List of first minority male lawyers and judges in the United States
- List of African American jurists
- List of Asian American jurists
- List of first women lawyers and judges by nationality (international)
- List of Hispanic and Latino American jurists
- List of Jewish American jurists
- List of LGBT jurists in the United States
- List of Native American jurists
