= Raja Rajeswari =

Indian-American judge

Raja Rajeswari (born in Chennai, India) is a criminal court judge in New York. She is the first Indian American and South Asian woman judge in the state. She graduated from Brooklyn Law School in 1998.

== See also ==
- List of Asian American jurists
- List of first women lawyers and judges in New York
