= Irma Vidal Santaella =

Puerto Rican judge ( 1924–2009)

Irma Milagros Vidal Santaella (née Thillet, October 4, 1924 – December 24, 2009) was a Puerto Rican-American judge and lawyer. She was noted as being the first Puerto Rican female lawyer and the first Puerto Rican female Supreme Court Justice in the state of New York.

Santaella was born in New York City on October 4, 1924, though she was raised by her mother and relatives in Puerto Rico. She graduated from Modern Business College in Ponce, Puerto Rico in 1942, and studied pre-med thereafter at Interamerican University of Puerto Rico.

Upon returning to New York and working as a licensed accountant, Santaella earned a bachelor's degree from Hunter College in 1957 before completing her legal education at Brooklyn Law School in 1961. In the same year, Santaella became the first Puerto Rican female admitted to practice law in New York. It was also during the 1960s that Santaella became a strong advocate of Puerto Rican rights. In 1962, she founded the Legion of Voters, Inc. and served as its president until 1968. During her time as president, Santaella helped Senator Jacob Javits and Robert F. Kennedy draft an amendment to the Voting Rights Act of 1965 to grant non-English speaking citizens the opportunity to vote. Santaella also ran for a Congressional seat twice.

In 1983, Santaella became the first Puerto Rican female to serve as a justice of the New York Supreme Court.

Santaella died in California on December 24, 2009, at the age of 85. The Justice Irma Vidal Santaella Memorial Award for Excellence in the Courtroom was created by the New York State Bar Association in her memory.

== See also ==
- List of first women lawyers and judges in New York
- List of Hispanic and Latino American jurists
