= Kate Stoneman =

American lawyer (1841-1925)

Katherine Stoneman
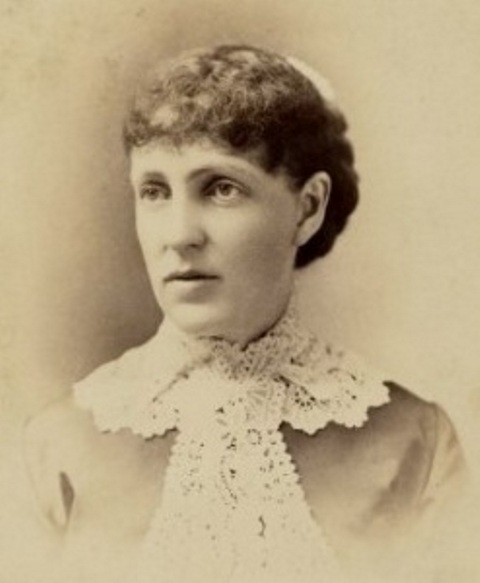
- Born: 1841; Busti, New York, U.S.
- Died: May 19, 1925 (aged 83–84)
- Resting place: Albany Rural Cemetery
- Education: Albany Normal School, Albany Law School
- Occupation: Attorney
- Known for: first woman admitted to the New York State Bar Association

Katherine Stoneman (April 1841 – May 19, 1925) was an early 20th-century suffragist and the first woman admitted to the Bar Association in the State of New York.

== Early life and family ==
Katherine (Kate) Stoneman was born on her family's farm in Busti, Chautauqua County, New York. She was the fifth of eight children. Her family was in the lumber business. Her father was also a justice of the peace for several years.

One of her brothers, George Stoneman, went on to become the Governor of California. Her brother Edward became a Judge on the Supreme Court of Illinois.

== Education and teaching career ==
In 1864, Stoneman began attending the Albany Normal School to pursue her goal of becoming a teacher. While at school, she worked for the New York Court of Appeals as a copyist. Kate graduated from Albany Law School of Union University, a private independent law school founded in 1851.

She graduated in 1866 and began teaching at the Glens Falls Seminary. She later taught at her alma mater, the Albany Normal School. She was the first female president of their alumni association, and served as Vice-Principal.

== Legal career ==
Kate Stoneman was the first woman to pass the New York Bar Exam in 1885. However, her application to the New York Bar was rejected in the spring of 1886 on the basis of her gender. With the help of local suffragettes, Stoneman urged for the introduction and passage of a bill to allow for the admission of all qualified applicants, regardless of race or gender. The bill was introduced, passed, and signed by Governor David Hill on May 20, 1886, only nine days after her initial rejection.

12 years after her admission to the bar, Stoneman went on to study law formally at Albany Law School. While studying law, she continued to teach at the State University of Albany and also clerked for a lawyer in the area. She was the first woman to graduate from Albany Law School in 1898. She maintained a law office in Albany from 1889 to 1922.

== Honors and awards ==
Stoneman died on May 19, 1925, and is buried in Albany Rural Cemetery. Stoneman was inducted into the National Women's Hall of Fame in October 2009.

The eponymous Kate Stoneman Project celebrates and advances women in the legal profession.

== See also ==
- List of first women lawyers and judges in New York
