= Jean H. Norris =

American judge (1877–1955)

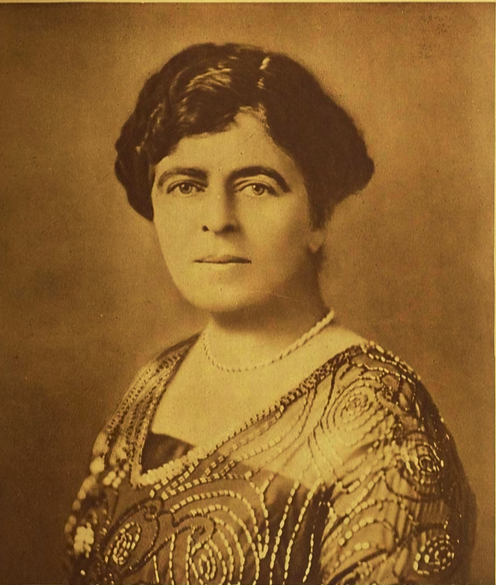
Jean H. Norris, from a 1921 magazine.

Jean Hortense Norris (January 25, 1877 – September 7, 1955) was an American judge, the first woman magistrate in New York City. She was appointed to the bench in 1919, but was removed from her judgeship and disbarred in 1931, for judicial malfeasance as a result of investigations by the Hofstadter Commission into Tammany Hall corruption in the city’s magistrate courts.

== Early life ==
Jean Hortense Noonan was from Brooklyn, New York, the daughter of John Giles Noonan and Maria Theresa Ford Noonan. Her father was a Union veteran of the American Civil War. She attended the Dominican Convent High School and Brooklyn Girls' High School. She earned law degrees from New York University in 1909 (LL.B.) and 1911 (LL.M.).

== Career ==
Norris was part of the Tammany Hall political organization, working alongside judge George Washington Olvany. She was active in the suffrage movement in the 1910s. She represented married women teachers who appealed their school boards' denial of maternity leave or continued employment. She also wrote about the laws concerning working conditions for women. She served as president of the National Women Lawyers' Association in 1914.

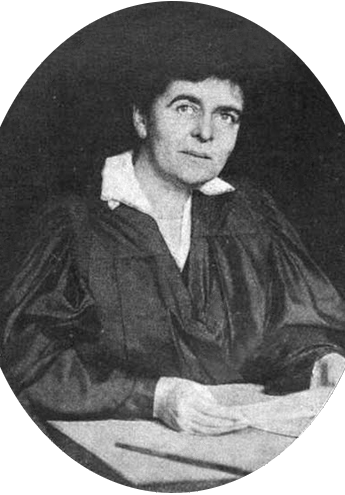
Jean H. Norris, from a 1920 publication.

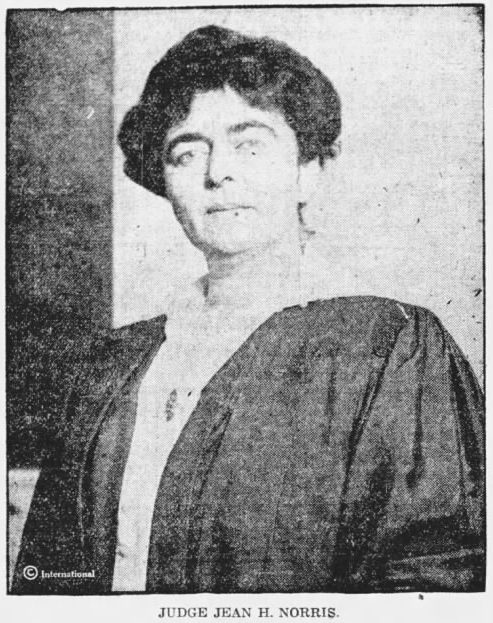
Jean H. Norris, from a 1921 newspaper.

Norris became the first woman judge in New York in 1919. Her first position on the bench was by the appointment of New York City mayor to temporarily fill a 30-day illness vacancy on the magistrates’ court, the lower criminal court that had jurisdiction over the women's court. In 1920, the mayor appointed Norris to complete a full term of seven years with the Court of Domestic Relations and the Women's Day Court. She was elected president of the New York State Federation of Business and Professional Women's Clubs. In 1923 she went on a world tour, to learn about how women offenders were handled in different court systems.

The Hofstadter Committee found that Norris was working in collaboration with the police, falsifying court records and profiting from the sale of bail bonds. She also endorsed Fleischmann's Yeast as a health supplement, wearing her judge's robes in advertisements, a violation of professional ethics. Five judges of the Appellate Division of the New York State Supreme Court ruled that she was guilty on five counts of judicial malfeasance. She was removed from the bench and disbarred in 1931. She unsuccessfully appealed her disbarment later that year.

Norris was known to be harsh in prostitution cases and cases involving black women. In over five thousand cases, "and especially in prostitution-related arrests of black women, Norris handed down 40 percent more convictions than other magistrates." This is exemplified by her decision to imprison dancer Mabel Hampton in Bedford Hills in 1924, who did not engage in prostitution and has described being framed in a setup by a police informant.

In 1933, the former magistrate sued the producers of a play titled Four O'Clock, because it included a corrupt woman judge that she believed was a damaging reference to her own legal troubles. The producers agreed to change the character's gender to settle the suit. In 1936 her essay "The Marriage Problem" appeared in American newspapers, predicting a constitutional amendment to make marriage and divorce laws more uniform across the United States.

== Personal life ==
Jean Noonan married Thomas H. Norris in 1897, and was widowed when he died from a self-inflicted gunshot wound, apparently by accident, in 1899.

== Death ==
Jean Hortense Norris died at the age of 78 on September 7, 1955, having lived the last 20 years of her life in relative obscurity. She was buried in Holy Cross Cemetery, Brooklyn alongside her father John G. Noonan (d.1894).

== See also ==
- List of first women lawyers and judges in New York
