= Jeanette Goodman Brill =

American lawyer and judge (1888–1964)

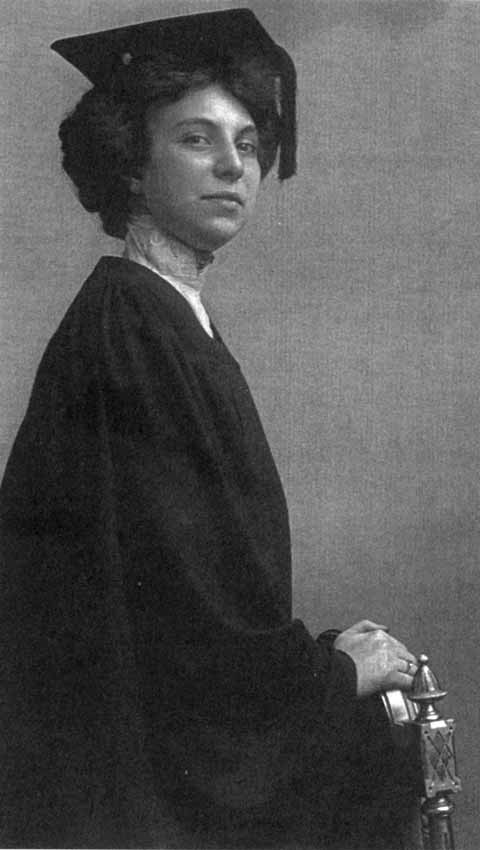

Jeanette Brill (née Goodman) (June 15, 1888 – March 30, 1964) was a Jewish-American lawyer and magistrate from Brooklyn. She was the first woman to serve as Deputy Attorney General of New York and the first woman magistrate in Brooklyn.

== Life ==
Brill was born on June 15, 1888, on the Lower East Side of Manhattan, New York. She is the daughter of Samuel Goodman and Sarah Pavelski.

Brill attended a commercial school. She taught at the Manhattan Preparatory School during the day while attending classes at night to receive a Regent's diploma. She then went to Brooklyn Law School while still teaching. She graduated from there in 1908, and in 1910 he was admitted to the bar. One of her first cases involved a poor black woman she saved from the death penalty, making her the first woman lawyer in New York to plead in a first degree murder case.

At one point, Brill worked in the law office of former Brooklyn County Court Judge Charles J. McDermott. She sought to secure jury service for women and a law to safeguard the marriage of young people. By 1923, she was one of the best-known women lawyers in Brooklyn, serving as president of the Brooklyn Woman's Bar Association, a founder and president of the Albany Heights Community Service League, and vice-president of the Madison Club. In July 1923, New York Attorney General Carl Sherman appointed her Deputy Attorney General and assigned to the Labor Department in Manhattan to assist in the prosecution of labor law violations. She was endorsed for the position by Brooklyn political boss John H. McCooey and McCooey's 18th Assembly District co-leader Sallie McRee Minsterer. She was the first woman to serve as Deputy Attorney General. She retired in the end of 1924, after which she resumed her law practice.

In May 1929, New York City Mayor Jimmy Walker appointed Brill City Magistrate to fill a vacancy caused by the death of Louis H. Reynolds. She was the second woman Magistrate in New York, the first being Jean H. Norris, and the first woman Magistrate in Brooklyn. John H. McCooey recommended her for that position. Nearly a thousand people attended her induction ceremony in June 1929 at the Flatbush Magistrate's Court. During Brill's induction ceremony, the court's chief magistrate judge noted that Brill's appointment made it possible for women defendants in Brooklyn to be heard by a woman judge, as was practiced within the Manhattan women's court at the time. The chief magistrate stated that he intended Brill to be the "chief presiding officer in such court" in addition to presiding over the family court.

In May 1931, Mayor Walker reappointed her Magistrate for a full ten-year term. In April 1940, she sat in the Manhattan Court of Special Sessions for two weeks, making her the first woman to sit in that court and the second woman to sit in the Court of Special Sessions. In May 1941, Mayor Fiorello La Guardia didn't reappoint her Magistrate and made her temporary justice of the Court of Domestic Relations while Justice Jane M. Bolin was on maternity leave. In May 1943, Mayor La Guardia appointed her assistant corporation counsel in the Queens Family Court. By then, she served on the bench for a total of twelve years, longer than any woman jurist in New York City at the time.

While on the bench, Brill was a strong supporter of the Adolescent Court in Brooklyn, which was established in 1935 as a social experiment for people between the ages of sixteen and eighteen. She and E. George Payne wrote a book on her experience with the Adolescent Court in 1938 called The Adolescent Court and Crime Prevention. During her time as a judge, Brill advocated for more women to be on the bench, citing women's unique contributions presiding over cases involving women, children, and families. While serving as Magistrate during the day, she spent her nights studying at the New York University School of Education and received a B.S. in psychology and sociology from there in 1938. She returned to her law practice after leaving the bench. Active in Democratic politics, she served as president of the Madison Democratic Club in Brooklyn and as a campaign manager for congresswoman Edna F. Kelly. In the 1930s, she founded Camp Kinni Kinnic for girls in Poultney, Vermont, and ran the camp with her son for over thirty years as camp director. In 1960, she became the first woman to receive a 50-year commemoration certificate from the Brooklyn Bar Association.

Brill was president of the Community Service League from 1920 to 1937 and of the Brooklyn Child Guidance Clinic from 1928 to 1937, vice-president of the National Crime Prevention Bureau, a director of the Federation of Jewish Charities, an organizer of the Brooklyn Women's Bar Association in 1915, president of the Brooklyn Law School Alumni from 1936 to 1937, and a member of the National Council of Jewish Women, the American Bar Association, the New York County Lawyers' Association, Iota Tau, Pi Lambda Theta, the New York State Prison Association, the Women's Press Club, the Women's City Club, and the Med. Jurisprudence Club. She attended Shaari Zedek and served as honorary president of its Sisterhood. In 1911, she married lawyer Abraham Brill. She practiced law with him in the law firm Brill Bergenfield and Brill at 50 Broadway until his death in 1950. Their children Helen Claire Brill Gordimer and Herbert Baer Brill were both lawyers.

Brill died at the Swedish Hospital in Brooklyn on March 30, 1964. She was buried in Mount Carmel Cemetery.
