= Doris Ling-Cohan =

American judge

Personal details
- Born: New York City, New York, U.S.
- Party: Democratic
- Education: City University of New York, Brooklyn (BA); New York University (JD)

Doris Ling-Cohan (simplified Chinese: 凌德丽; traditional Chinese: 凌德麗; pinyin: Líng Délì) is a former justice of the New York State Supreme Court, to which she was elected in 2002; she is the first woman of Asian descent to attain that position. In 2014, Justice Ling-Cohan was appointed to the Appellate Term, First Department. She is the first woman of Asian descent to be appointed to an appellate panel in New York state. Ling-Cohan was born in Chinatown, Manhattan, the daughter of Chinese immigrants; her mother was a seamstress and her father was a laundryman. She is the first person in her family to graduate college.

== Education ==
She received a degree in psychology (summa cum laude) from Brooklyn College, in 1976. She was admitted into New York University's School of Law on a full scholarship, from which she graduated in 1979.

== Professional life ==
Judge Ling-Cohan began her career as an attorney working for several New York Legal Services agencies, including Bedford Stuyvesant Legal Services and Manhattan's MFY Legal Services ( representing indigent clients, before she joined the New York State Attorney General's consumer fraud protection unit. She represented the State of New York against General Motors, defending the State's Lemon Law. Additionally, she taught classes in law and Asian American studies at CUNY School of Law, New York University, City College, and Queens College. In 1995 Judge Ling-Cohan was elected to the Civil Court of the City of New York from the Second Municipal Court District, which includes Chinatown, marking the first time a person of Asian/Chinese descent was elected to public office from Chinatown, other than school board. At this time, Judge Ling-Cohan decided to seek elected office because of the absence of public officers of Asian descent in Chinatown, and the City and State. Against all odds, she won a heavily contested primary to make history, with the assistance of the Chinese and progressive Downtown communities.

In 2002, after being nominated by the Manhattan Democratic party for election to the New York State Supreme Court, she received the support of the state Republican, Democratic, Liberal, and Working Family parties. Ling-Cohan was elected to that post, receiving more than 230,000 votes. In a field of 6, she had the second highest vote count which secured a seat on the Supreme Court, making history as the first woman of Asian descent to be elected to NYS Supreme Court. After serving with distinction on the Supreme Court, she was elevated to the Appellate Term First Dept, making history as the first woman of Asian descent to serve on NYS's appellate courts. Judge Ling-Cohan is a member of several professional and humanitarian associations; she is a founding member of the Asian American Bar Association and helped found the New York Asian Women's Center—which is the first group dedicated to the prevention of domestic violence in New York City's Asian communities, now known as WomanKind. Additionally, she is a founding member of the Jade Council, an organization for Asian court employees, a founder of Asian Pacific American Voter Alliance (APAVA), and a former board member and officer of OCA-NY. She was the President of National Judicial Council ( organization of federal and state judges) for 5 years.

Brooklyn College has honored Judge Ling-Cohan with its Distinguished Alumna Award, in recognition of her service to New York city as well as her advocacy for immigrants and non-English speakers' rights.The Asian American Bar of New York and National Asian Pacific American Bar Association has similarly honored her.

== Same-sex marriage ==
Judge Ling-Cohan made national news when she handed down a ruling in Hernandez v. Robles, a case in which five gay and lesbian couples had sued New York, arguing that denying them marriage rights violated the state constitution. Ling-Cohan sided with the plaintiffs, and as of February 15, 2005, the ruling was on hold pending the outcome of an appeal filed by the state. See Judge Ling-Cohan's ruling in Hernandez v. Robles (PDF file) The decision was subsequently reversed by two appellate courts; however, same-sex marriage in the state of New York became legal on July 24, 2011, under the Marriage Equality Act, which was passed by the New York State Legislature on June 24, 2011 and signed by Governor Andrew Cuomo on the same day.

When she issued her decision, she was the first and only trial judge in NYS to decide in favor of Marriage Equality and the third in the country, at a time when approximately 1/3 of the country favored Marriage Equality, and consequently she faced death threats.

== See also ==
- List of Asian American jurists
- List of first women lawyers and judges in New York
- Chinese Americans in New York City
- Same-sex marriage in New York
