= Carmen Velasquez =

Ecuadorian-American judge

Carmen R. Velasquez
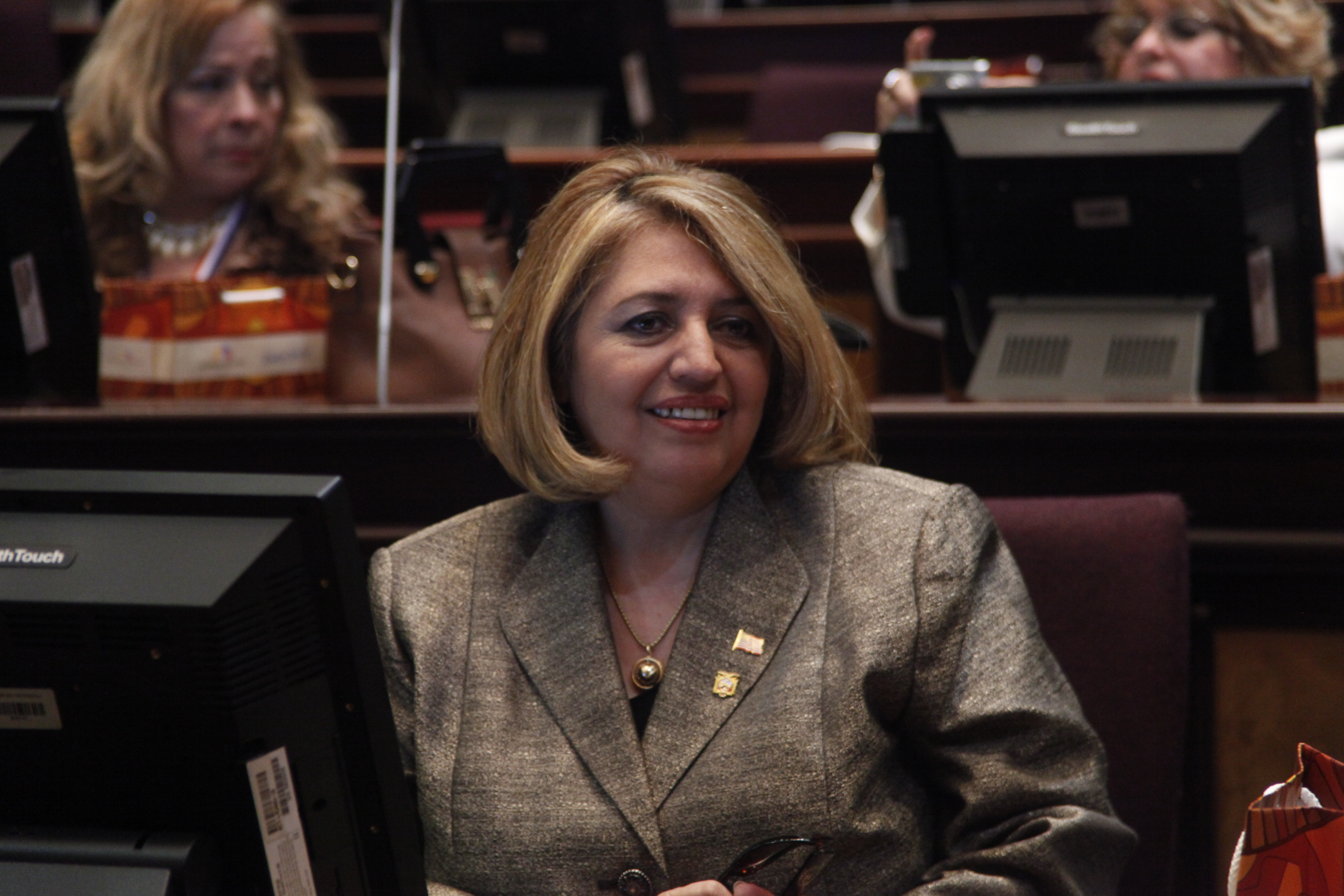
- Velasquez in 2015

Justice at the New York Supreme Court
- In office January 2015 – December 31, 2028

Judge of the New York City Civil Court
- In office 2009–2014

Personal details
- Born: May 30, 1960 (age 66) Quito, Ecuador
- Education: John Jay College of Criminal Justice, 1984

Carmen R. Velasquez (/ˈkɑːrmɛn ˌvɛˈlɑːskɛz/; born May 30, 1960) is a Supreme Court Justice serving in the 11th district of the State of New York since January 2015. She has also served as judge for the New York City Civil Court of Queens County previously to her election. Velasquez is the first Ecuadorian to serve as judge for the Civil Court and Supreme Court of the State of New York.

== Early life and education ==
Carmen Velasquez was born in Quito, Ecuador on May 30, 1960. Her family moved to Queens, New York in 1975, when she was 14 years old. Velasquez graduated from Long Island CIty High School in 1978. She received a Bachelor of Arts degree from John Jay College of Criminal Justice in 1984, and her law degree from Temple University School of Law in 1987. Judge Velasquez also studied at the University of Athens' Law School during the summer of 1985. She also worked as an intern for the Appellate Division 1st Department during the summer of 1986.

== Legal experience and career ==
Velasquez was an Assistant District Attorney in the District Office of Bronx County from 1987 to 1988. She subsequently worked at the New York Department of Sanitation, in the Bureau of Legal Affairs, as Assistant Department Advocate from 1988 to 1989 and as Deputy Department Advocate from 1989 to 1991. From 1991 to 2008 she was in private practice in Queens, New York. From 2000 to 2002 she was an adjunct professor at John Jay College of Criminal Justice. In November 2008 she was elected for a 10-year term as a Civil Court Judge for the State of New York, from 2009 to 2018, serving until 2014, being the first Ecuadorian to be elected for the seat in the United States.

== 2014 New York elections ==
Velasquez ran for election to the Supreme Court, 11th District during 2014. She competed with 8 other candidates for the 4 available seats during the general election on November 4, earning a seat with 14.3% of the votes. In January 2015, she began serving as Justice at the Long Island Courthouse, in Queens County, for a 14-year term, ending in December 2028. The election resulted in her being the first Ecuadorian to be elected by general vote and to obtain the title of Justice in the State of New York.

Starting January 2016 Velasquez served at the Queens General Courthouse in Jamaica, Queens.

== Awards and civic involvement ==
In 2011 Carmen Velasquez received the Outstanding Public Service Award by U.S. Congressman Joseph Crowley. She has also received multiple recognitions from the Ecuadorian government as well as organizations from other Latin American countries since 2003. Velasquez has also received citations from State Assemblyman Michael DenDekker, New York 13th District Representative Jose Peralta, Assemblyman Francisco Moya and New York City Council Member Julissa Ferreras; and State Senator Brian Stack in 2014, Linda Machado from the Assembly of Ecuador in 2012, Congressman Joseph Crowley in 2011, and New York City Council Member Peter Vallone Jr. Throughout her career, Carmen Velasquez has been involved in the defense and betterment of civil rights for immigrants.

Velasquez is also a Founding Member, and Past President and Treasurer of the Latino Lawyers Association of Queens County, established in 1997. She is also a member and Past President of the Hispanic National Bar Association, New York Region. She also founded the Spanish American Club at Long Island City Highschool, currently being an advisor to the organization.

== See also ==
- Judiciary of New York
- Courts of New York
- New York Supreme Court
- Ecuadorian Americans
