= Womankind (charity) =

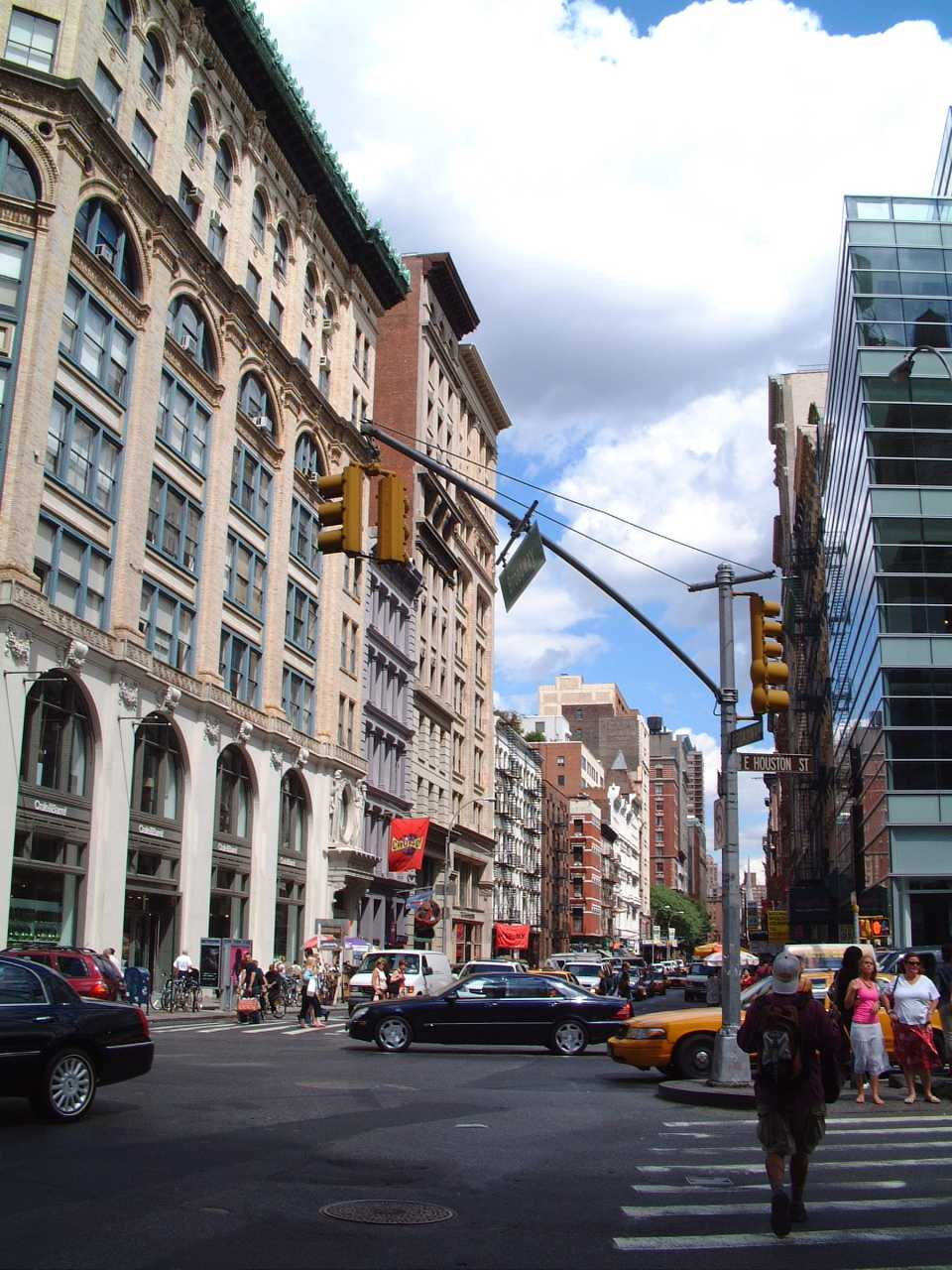
- Founded: 1982; 44 years ago United States
- Founder: Pat Eng
- Type: Nonprofit organization
- Headquarters: 32 Broadway, 10th Floor New York, NY 10004
- Location: New York
- Services: Protecting abused Asian women and their children to overcome domestic and sextual violence
- Fields: Legal advocacy
- Key people: Niketa Sheth (Executive Director), Larry Lee (Former Executive Director), Karen Elizaga (Chairman of Board of Directors)
- Website: www.iamwomankind.org

Womankind, formerly known as the New York Asian Women's Centre (NYAWC), was founded in 1982 by a group of volunteers led by Pat Eng. In 2017, the NYAWC changed its name to Womankind. It is a non-profit organization which aims to empower Asian survivors of gender based violence. Womankind was initially a community awareness program designed to educate families about domestic violence in Chinatown, and then developed into a 24-hour multilingual hotline that now includes 18 different Asian languages and dialects. Womankind also provides Asian immigrant women confidential services including an emergency refuge, shelter services, crisis counseling, 24-hour online free multilingual hotline, welfare promotion, support groups, parenting workshops, children's services, volunteer training, community education, and some English courses. Each year, the organization receives over 3,000 hotline calls.

Larry Lee served as the executive director of Womankind from 2009, retiring in 2019. The Board of Directors appointed Niketa Sheth as the new executive director, now CEO, of the organization in September 2019. Karen Elizaga is the Chair of the board of directors of the organization.

In 1991, President George H. W. Bush issued the President's Volunteer Action Award to Womankind and also received the End Domestic Violence Award given by Governor George Pataki in 2002.

== History ==
=== 1980s ===
Womankind was founded in 1982 by a group of volunteers who answer the call from the abused Asian women. Led by Founding Executive Director, Pat Eng, direct the first meeting to discuss the issues why Asian women are exposed to domestic violence in the community but rarely receive social attention and addressed. In 1983, Womankind launched a community campaign to boycott domestic violence. In 1984, the first hotline has been launched on the East Coast with limited hours available, to address the problem from battered Asian women. Meanwhile, the All-volunteer counseling training program also proposed. In 1985, the move by volunteers to bring abused women and children back to their homes in an emergency had effectively created the first organized housing program for East Asian battered Asian women while conducting the organization's early fundraising activities. Three years later, Womankind hired the first full-time employees to establish a safe haven for women and children who were hit hard by the limited economic options faced by most battered women. Emotional assistance and support were also provided, in addition to counseling and childcare for abused children.

=== 1990s ===
The Womankind established the first 24-hour Asian multilingual hotline in New York City in 1990, consisting only of volunteers. In the same year, the organization received the Eleanor Roosevelt Community Service Award from Governor Mario Cuomo and the Susan B. Anthony Award from NOW-NYC. A year later, President George H.W. Bush awarded the organization's Presidential Volunteer Action Award and published the inaugural issue of the Center's Trilingual Communications. In 1992, city officials issued a 10-year unremitting effort to Womankind and its volunteers to combat violence against women at the "Volunteer Salute" ceremony held at the City Hall. At the same time, the organization also won the Gloria Steinem "women of vision" award from the Women's Foundation and the Women's Warrior Award from the Asia Pacific Women's Network. Womankind's service continued to evolve and the Children's Program was launched in 1995, which provides counseling, creative arts therapy, and parenting support. The celebration of the 15th anniversary in 1997 was held in the City Hall to commemorate the strength and courage of the battered Asian women. The center also launched other programs in 1998, including a "Youth Mentoring Program" in partnership with Columbia University. Womankind also rented several "safety apartments" for battered women and their children during this time.

=== 2000s ===
In 2001, Womankind began providing 24-hour emergency shelters for abused Asian women. A year later, NYAWC received the End Domestic Violence Award which given by Governor George Pataki and added a third accommodation facility for battered women and children. Moreover, the 20th anniversary of the Tribeca Rooftop held with the theme "Rise from the Ashes: Celebrating the Courage and Power of Women in 20 Years". In 2003, Womankind purchased a shelter facility for the first time. A year later, the organization owned the first refuge, known as the Rose House. The shelter is mainly open to and services to battered women and their children. Furthermore, Womankind continues to extend its protection beyond domestic abuse. Project Free was established in 2005, which initiative to end human trafficking and assist Asian trafficking survivors. The organization held its 25th anniversary gala in Tribeca Rooftop two years later. In 2008, Womankind launched the Hitting Home project, becoming the first domestic violence agency to work with child welfare agencies to address domestic violence in New York City. In 2009, Womankind was awarded a 20-bed facility by the New York State Homeless Housing and Aid Company, which is now known as Peace House – the second of Womankind's two emergency shelter residences. Around this time, the agency's first federal grant was awarded to launch Safety First with Lutheran Medical Center and launch Home Court Advantage at the Children's Law Center in New York City.

=== 2010s ===
In 2011, the organization established its Legal Program. There are two main uses for this program. One is to focus on helping survivors through immigration, and the other is to use family laws to break and control those who are perpetrators and traffickers. In 2012, Womankind was honored with the Phoenix Award. The award was presented by Doris Ling-Cohan, the Supreme Court Justice of New York. Meanwhile, Womankind was preparing to expand its range of services to achieve self-sufficiency for women victims better by imparting financial knowledge and implementing a transitional housing program. In 2017, the New York Asian Women's Center (NYAWC) officially changed its name to Womankind. The organization's new name and logo have extraordinary meaning. Frank Liu, the chief creative officer at Siegelvision, said that in terms of font selection, they used a unique font inspired by Beyoncé, a powerful and bold woman. Further, they chose the identifiable "Phoenix" symbol as a perfect example of their new slogan, "Beyond Violence"; used yellow and orange on the font color to indicate "hope" and purple as the universal color for domestic violence; and, by visually separating the words "woman" and "kind", the dual meaning of the word "kind" was emphasized.

== Purpose ==
Womankind is committed to helping victims overcome the trauma of domestic violence and other forms of violence. The primary purpose of the NYAWC is to save and heal those who experience domestic violence, human trafficking, sexual violence, and violence in later life. For instance, it provides housing assistance, employment, language training, legal immigration assistance, financial authorization, and more. In addition, the Centre is committed to raising public awareness of violence against women and upholding the rights of victims.

== Services ==
=== 24-hour multilingual helpline ===
Womankind provides a 24-hour call helpline for victims to provide services and solve problems. Hotline advocates can not only answer questions about domestic violence but also offer information about the organization's services and develop a plan to ensure safety. The Helpline provides more than 18 Asian languages and dialects, as well as Spanish.

=== Emergency housing ===
Womankind provides two emergency shelters for victims. One is Rose House, and the other is Peace House. Both shelters have a welcoming environment and supportive staff to provide comfort and comfort to survivors of domestic violence and sexual violence and their children. Highly trained staff create a safe environment for women who are victims of domestic or sexual violence and their children. Besides, there are a total of 40 beds in the shelter to provide treatment for the victims. Moreover, Rose House and Peace House are New York State's only licensed cultural and language facilities that serve 90-day pan-Asian survivors of domestic and sexual violence. Survivors can receive continuous care after leaving.

=== Community education ===
Womankind provides service providers and community members with a variety of training programs and services, including on domestic violence, sexual abuse, human trafficking, old-age abuse, and cultural sensitivity. Staff can also perform these training in the various languages used by the institution. Also, Womankind participates in multiple community meetings and events throughout the city. Its purpose is to provide outreach, education, and advocacy for survivors and communities that serve.

=== Counseling ===
With a team of high-quality advocates who provide treatment support and prompt and professional services, they aim to promote the healing of wounds. Advocates receive training to support their customers as they think, feel, and pay to help them achieve their goals in their native language. The healing environment begins with the relationship between survivors and advocates, which helps restore trust in another person and increases the alliance that supports the recovery process. This dual relationship continues to expand into a trust relationship that develops with peers and other community members. The nature and power of relationships are critical to survivors for gaining trust, increasing hope, gaining support, and building self-esteem.

=== Asian Youth Program ===
The Asian Youth Program (AYP) is a mentoring program for children aged 6 to 12 who are affected by violence in collaboration with Columbia University's Community Impact Program. AYP pairs children and college students to achieve one-to-one relationships, and promotes relationships by organizing a wealth of activities and leisure travel around cultural attractions around New York City. Provide social, emotional, academic, and entertainment support in such a group environment relationship. Since 1998, Womankind has provided participants with opportunities to learn about what New York City has to offer, such as educating them about new communities and people, as well as new social, cultural and educational experiences.

=== Federal funding ===
In September 2016, US Senators Charles Schumer and Kirsten Gillibrand announced that the federal Department of Justice (DOJ) would provide $300,000 in funding for the New York Asian Women's Centre. The funding was distributed by the DOJ's Office on Violence against Women and approved through the Sexual Assault Service Program. These funds can be used in providing culturally-recognized consulting, publicity, and other support services, for instance, providing psychological counseling and support to victims and their families. Although this funding has many different uses, the main purpose is to support Asian child victims who have been sexually assaulted and sexually abused.
