= George Washington Olvany =

American Fire Commissioner

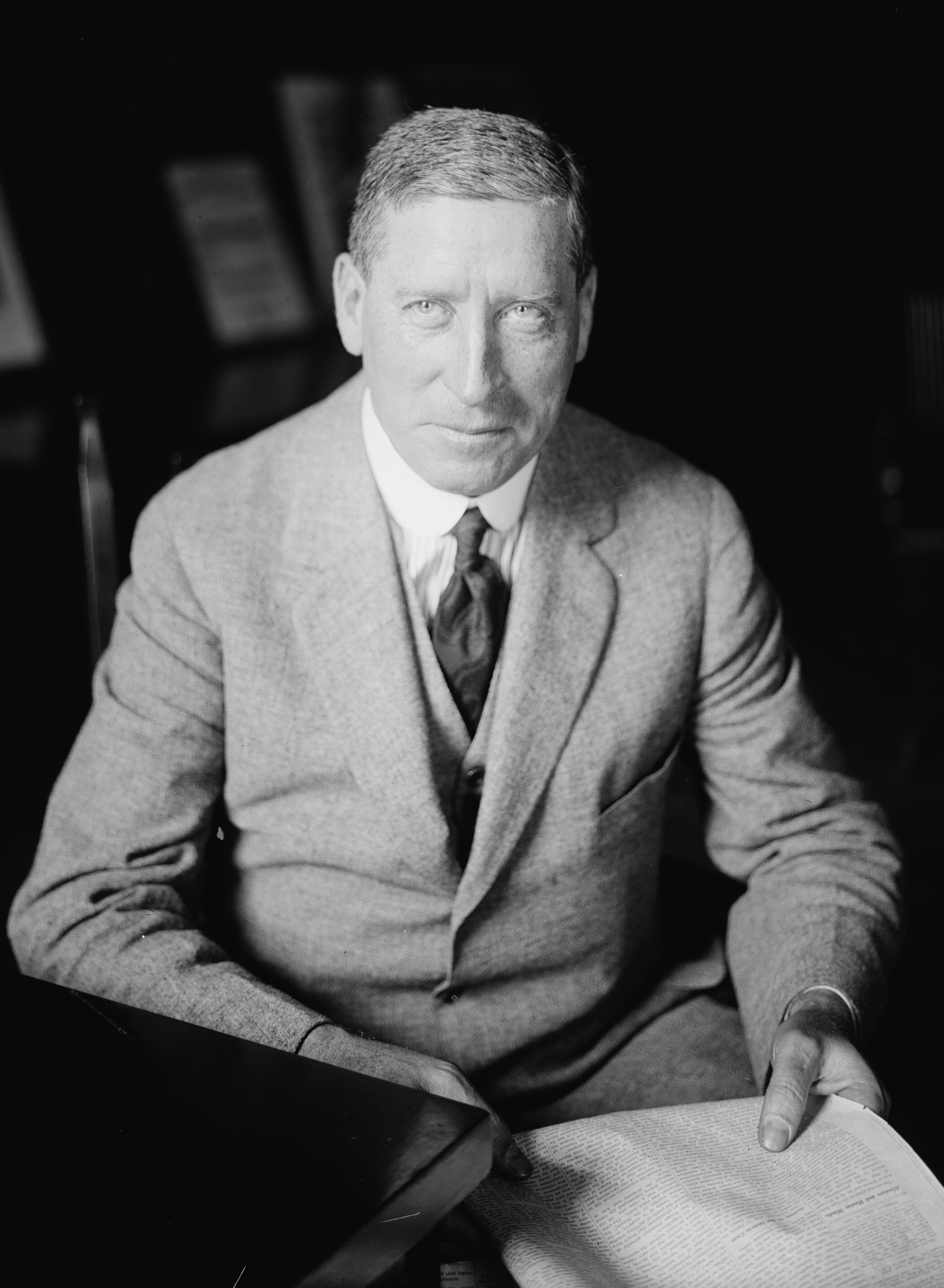
George W. Olvany

Judge George Washington Olvany (June 20, 1876 – October 15, 1952) was a New York General Sessions Court judge, the deputy New York City Fire Commissioner, and the leader of Tammany Hall.

== Biography ==
He was born on June 20, 1876. He replaced Charles Francis Murphy in 1924 as the leader of Tammany Hall. Olvany was the first Tammany Hall boss to have received a college education. A popular story used to describe Olvany was as follows: A Board of Alderman meeting in the early 1900s was interrupted by a youngster who yelled, "Alderman, your saloon is on fire!" All the other Alderman left the room. While acting as the Boss, Olvany used his law firm Olvany, Eisner and Donnelly, to direct other law firms to bring clients before the city's Board of Standards and Appeals. Olvany firm garnered up to $5 million from fees at the point when the Seabury Commission began investigating at the behest of New York Governor Franklin D. Roosevelt. He resigned from Tammany Hall in 1929. He died on October 15, 1952.

Party political offices
Preceded by Charles Francis Murphy	Grand Sachem of Tammany Hall; 1924-1929	Succeeded by John Francis Curry
