= Clarice Baright =

American judge

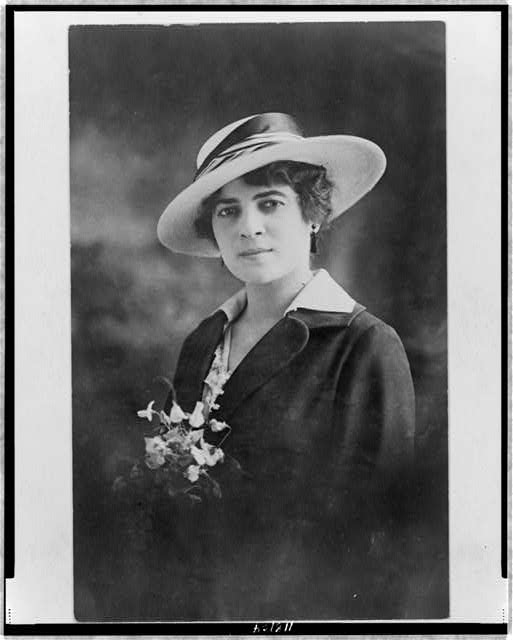
Portrait of attorney and social worker Clarice Baright

Clarice Baright (1881-1961) was an American attorney and social worker. Baright was the second female and first Jewish woman to be sworn in as magistrate of New York City.

== Personal life ==
Clarice Baright, born Sadie Margoles, was born in 1881 in Vienna, Austria to Elizabeth and Shussman Margoles. The family immigrated to the United States three years later. She married George Frances Baright, an insurance salesman, who had two children from a previous marriage.

== Career ==
Baright attended law classes at New York University while working full-time as a clerk. She was teased for being one of a few women attending these classes. She did not formally earn a law degree, but she was admitted to the New York State Bar Association in 1905.

She worked on the Lower East Side advocating specifically for juveniles and rehabilitating juvenile delinquents. She eventually earned the nickname the "Lady Angel of the Tenement District". In 1915, she was recommended to the bench of the New York City Family Court division's Court of Special Sessions, but Mayor John Purroy Mitchel turned her down as a candidate. She would be appointed to the position ten years later by Mayor John Hylan, making Baright the second female magistrate in New York. Her term lasted only a short time, and she was unable to secure long-term appointments in following years. Despite this, she kept up her legal work, eventually becoming a formal member of the law firm Markewich, Rosenhaus, Beck, and Garfinkle.

== See also ==
- List of first women lawyers and judges in New York
