= Mary Grace Quackenbos =

United States Attorney

Mary Grace Quackenbos Humiston
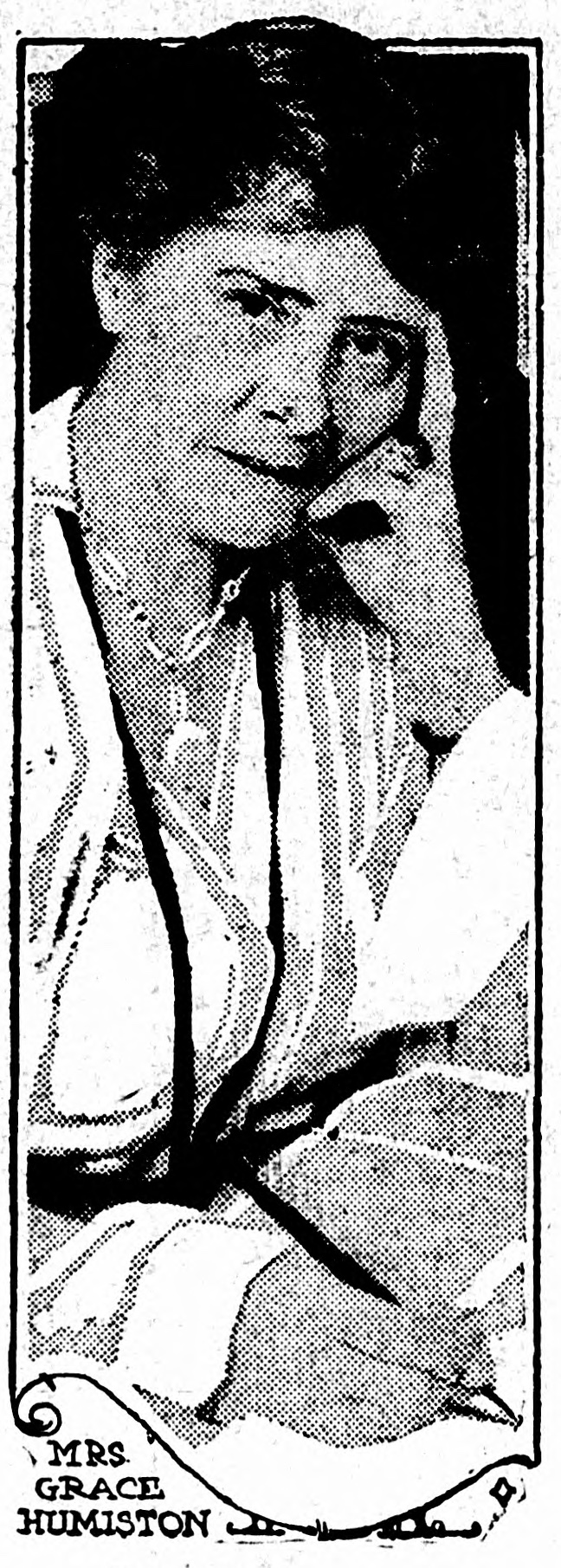
- in 1917

Special Assistant United States Attorney for the Southern District of New York

Personal details
- Born: Mary Grace Winterton; September 17, 1869 New York City, US
- Died: July 15, 1948 (aged 78) New York City, US
- Spouses: Henry Forrest Quackenbos (m. 1895; div. before 1911); Howard Donald Humiston (m. 1911; died 1943)
- Education: Hunter College; New York University (LL.B.)
- Profession: Lawyer

Mary Grace Quackenbos Humiston (née Winterton) (1869–1948) was the first female Special Assistant United States Attorney. She was a graduate of the New York University School of Law and was a leader in exposing peonage in the American South. She was also known for a short time as "Mrs. Sherlock Holmes", starting with her work solving the cold case of Ruth Cruger who disappeared in New York in 1917.

== Early life and education ==
Quackenbos Humiston was born Mary Grace Winterton on September 17, 1869, in New York City. Her father was Adoniram Judson Winterton, a well-to-do merchant and prominent in the laywork of the Baptist church. She was a great-niece of Admiral Hull, and her grandfather, Henry S. Hull, was the partner of William Lloyd Garrison of anti-slavery fame.

She was educated at Hunter College in New York and graduated in 1888. She also taught for a short time at the Collegiate School on West 77th Street. With an independent fortune she entered the study of law at the Law School of New York University in order to better manage her estate. Dean Ashley of the law school was impressed with her abilities and urged her to attend evening sessions, so that she completed the three-year course in two years and graduated ranked seventh in her class. She graduated with a Bachelor of Laws in 1903 and, after spending one year with the Legal Aid Society, was admitted to the bar in 1904 and eventually made the decision to practice regularly.

== People's Law Firm ==
Quackenbos founded the People's Law Firm in 1905. The firm focused primarily on the cases of the working poor and immigrants. Quackenbos explained in The New York Times after a successful case that she started it to provide working people with "St. Regis law at Mills Hotel Prices, and such other assistance as they may need in the redressing of wrongs at a cost within their means." She went on to say, "My idea in establishing the firm was to demonstrate that a legal bureau for the aid of the poor could be operated at a scale of prices within their reach and to their great benefit, and I think this has been done."

One of her best-known cases was that of Mrs. Antoinette Tolla, a woman from Kingsland, New Jersey, who was accused of murdering Joseph Sonta and sentenced to death. At the request of the Italian Consul-General, Count Massiglla, Quackenbos agreed to take the case and refused to take a fee, saying she "would prefer to take the case without remunera as woman for woman." On March 9, three days before Mrs. Tolla was to hang, Quackenbos, after a week's effort, induced the board of pardons of New Jersey to commute the death sentence to seven and one-half years imprisonment. She demonstrated that Tolla had killed Sonta in self-defense, and that the evidence she presented at trial had not been properly translated.

== Peonage ==
During the early years of the People's Law Firm, Quackenbos was approached by several clients that wanted assistance finding relatives or friends that had gone South and then disappeared completely. Upon investigation she discovered rampant peonage in turpentine camps in the South, as well as a network of agents that operated in New York City to lure workers to the southern camps.

Quackenbos traveled south at great personal risk to investigate the conditions in the camps. She once disguised herself as an old native woman selling scissors to enter a camp; at another she slipped inside on wagons that carried supplies. She also posed as a magazine writer in order to gain access to the camps.

After her first trip to the South investigating the camps in 1906, she returned with a fever but also 46 affidavits against actors in the peonage system. This prompted an investigation to be opened by the Department of Justice and a trip by Assistant Attorney General Charles Wells Russell through the South to investigate the charges.

Due to these investigations the Department of Justice ultimately hired her as Special Assistant United States District Attorney for the Southern District of New York. That appointment was then extended to cover peonage matters throughout the country. She was the first woman to attain such a position in the Department of Justice.

As part of her investigations into peonism while at the Department of Justice she traveled extensively abroad, to the Holy Land, Egypt, Turkey, Greece, Germany and Italy – investigating the systems by which immigrants were lured into peonism. She became one of the first to make public the organized attempts to entice foreigners to America and into peonism.

== Sunnyside Plantation ==
In the spring of 1907, while at the Department of Justice, Quackenbos continued to investigate cases of immigrant laborers held in peonage across Southern states. During this time, the Italian ambassador to the United States, Baron Edmondo Des Planches, visited the Mississippi Delta to investigate complaints of mistreatment of Italians who were laboring on cotton plantations there. On June 4, 1907, he wrote to Secretary of State Elihu Root requesting that Quackenbos investigate the conditions of Italian laborers in the Delta.

Quackenbos arrived at Sunnyside Plantation across the river from Greenville, Mississippi in the town of Lake Village, Arkansas in July 1907 to investigate the allegations. Sunnyside was owned by the O.B. Crittenden Company. Among the firm's senior partners was LeRoy Percy, a lawyer, cotton planter, and Delta political leader.

During the course of the investigation, Quackenbos spent nights in the shacks that the immigrants lived in, drank the "red, iron-laden" water, and dispatched an investigator undercover to sneak onto the plantation at night. She also, through threats of imprisonment, convinced one of the labor agents for the O.B. Crittenden Company to confess to questionable labor practices that implicated Percy himself in the bad conditions for workers at Sunnyside. While at Sunnyside Percy arranged for her notes to be stolen from her hotel room and then "recovered" by a close associate – sending the message to Quackenbos that she could not touch him. She responded by having his partner, O.B. Crittenden, arrested and also worked to have stories planted in the press nationwide deploring the conditions at the plantation. One headline blared "Millionaire Has Slaves".

Percy used his personal friendship with then-President Theodore Roosevelt to have Quackenbos removed from the investigation at Sunnyside. Ultimately though, her report was released, and the investigation resulted in a slowing of Italian laborers to the Mississippi Delta, as the Italian government began to warn immigrants away from settlement there.

== Criticism and resistance ==
Quackenbos met fierce resistance to her work to expose peonage. Plantation owners such as LeRoy Percy deliberately worked to thwart her investigations, often using the fact that she was a woman to belittle her work. One southern newspaper, reporting on her investigations, referred to her as "busybody Quackenbos". Articles sometimes focused on the fact that she was a woman and her dress rather than on the results of her investigations. A New York Times article on her appointment to the Department of Justice included the following description of Quackenbos:

Mrs. Quackenbos is young and pretty, with jet black eyes and hair, a vivacious manner, and a glance of keen penetration. Her figure is tall, slender, and girlish. She always wears well-made black gowns, with touches of white at the neck and sleeves. Her hat is the most distinctive part of her attire, for it is rather wide and flat, and from it, in the back, hang short folds of mourning veiling. Mrs. Quackenbos assumed this dress at the time of the death of her parents a few years ago.

Others criticized her efforts as having a chilling effect on immigration that was at the time beneficial to parts of the South experiencing labor shortages. To these critics in one Louisiana newspaper she responded, "One thing which I am compelled to fight against is the fact that few persons yet realize my motive and purpose. With proper support I believe I can completely wipe out peonage in the south within the next year." Quackenbos believed that immigration would actually increase if the conditions for the workers in the South were improved.

== "Mrs. Sherlock Holmes" ==
Later in her career Quackenbos, now better known by the name Mrs. Grace Humiston, was given the moniker "Mrs. Sherlock Holmes" after solving the disappearance of 18-year-old Ruth Cruger.

Cruger disappeared on February 13, 1917. The police investigated, but the case went cold quickly. Press coverage of the case was intense, as Cruger was the daughter of a well-to-do family, her father being a public accountant. Her disappearance became wrapped up in national concerns about white slavery that were sweeping the country at the time. Suspecting the police had not fully investigated his daughter's disappearance, Henry Cruger posted a $1,000 reward and hired Humiston to investigate. She took the case pro bono, and after interviewing several Harlem residents and deciphering a blurred message on a blotter, Humiston determined to search the basement of suspect Alfredo Cocchi. There Humiston found the body of Ruth Cruger.

Cruger then accused the NYPD of negligence, and a subsequent investigation revealed that there had been a longstanding kickback scheme between Cocchi and the local police. Because of the case and the resulting public criticism, Humiston was named a special investigator to the New York City Police Department, charged with tracing missing girls, in July 1917.

As a result of the case Humiston incorporated the Morality League of America, an organization that was founded to

gather and disseminate facts which will impress the public with the dangers to women and girls throughout the United States...and to investigate and report to the authorities for prosecution complaints regarding immoral conditions which may exist throughout New York and the United States and urge the passage of legislation necessary to promote the purposes of the organization.

Cocchi was arrested in Bologna, Italy, and sentenced to 27 years in prison.

== Personal life ==
Quackenbos Humiston was married twice, the first time to Major Henry Forrest Quackenbos in New York City on June 5, 1895. Her second marriage was to Howard Donald Humiston in Lima, Peru, on June 8, 1911.

Mary Grace Humiston died in 1948 at the age of 77, in French Hospital in New York City. During the time leading up to her death she lived at the Vanderbilt Hotel. She is buried in Woodlawn Cemetery in The Bronx, New York City.

== Depiction in media ==
In the season 2 episode "Mrs. Sherlock Holmes" of Timeless, Sarah Sokolovic portrays Grace.

The podcast Criminal produced an episode, "Mrs. Sherlock Holmes," about Grace and her work on the Ruth Cruger case.

The podcast Tenfold More Wicked Presents Wicked Words produced an episode, "Brad Ricca: Mrs. Sherlock Holmes," about Ricca's book detailing the events of the Ruth Cruger case. The episode was released on June 13, 2022.
