= List of first women lawyers and judges in Oklahoma =

This is a list of the first women lawyer(s) and judge(s) in Oklahoma. It includes the year in which the women were admitted to practice law (in parentheses). Also included are women who achieved other distinctions such becoming the first in their state to graduate from law school or become a political figure.

== Firsts in state history ==
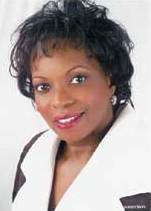
Vicki Miles-LaGrange: First African American female Judge (1994) and Chief Judge (2008) of the U.S. District Court for the Western District of Oklahoma

=== Law degree ===
- First African American female law graduate: Ada Lois Sipuel Fisher in 1951

=== Lawyers ===
- First female to pass the Oklahoma Territory Bar: Minerva K. Elliott Lentz (1893)
- First (half-Shawnee) female: Laura Lykins (1898)
- First female from Oklahoma admitted before the U.S. Supreme Court: Ethel Maude Proffit Stephenson
- First African American female: Ada Lois Sipuel Fisher (1952)
- First full-blood Native American female: Patricia Paddlety Horse (1975)

=== Law Clerk ===
- First (Native American-Chickasaw Nation) female to clerk for the Oklahoma Supreme Court and Criminal Court of Appeals: Jessie Elizabeth Randolph Moore in 1926

=== State judges ===
- First female (judicial officer): Faye L. Roblin in 1921
- First female: Grace Elmore Gibson in 1930
- First female (Oklahoma Court of Civil Appeals): Patricia MacGuigan in 1982
- First female (Oklahoma Supreme Court): Alma Wilson (1941) in 1982
- First African American female: Susan Bragg in 1985
- First female (Oklahoma Court of Criminal Appeals): Rita M. Strubhar in 1993
- First female (Chief Justice; Oklahoma Supreme Court): Alma Wilson (1941) in 1995
- First Asian American (female): Cindy Truong in 2010

=== Federal judges ===
- First female (United States Magistrate Judge in the six-state Tenth Circuit): Robin Cauthron in 1991
- First African American female (U.S. District Court for the Western District of Oklahoma): Vicki Miles-LaGrange (1977) in 1994
- First female (U.S. District Court for the Northern District of Oklahoma): Claire Eagan in 2001
- First female (U.S. District Court for the Eastern District of Oklahoma): Kimberly E. West
- First African American female (Chief Judge; U.S. District Court for the Western District of Oklahoma): Vicki Miles-LaGrange (1977) in 2008
- First Native American female [Cherokee] (U.S. District Court for the Northern District of Oklahoma): Sara E. Hill in 2023

=== Attorney General of Oklahoma ===
- First female: Susan B. Loving from 1991-1995

=== Assistant Attorney General ===
- First female: Kathryn Van Leuven from 1922-1928

=== United States Attorney ===
- First (African American) female (Western District of Oklahoma): Vicki Miles-LaGrange (1977) in 1993
- First female hired (Western District of Oklahoma): Susie Pritchett

=== County Attorney (abolished office) ===
- First female: Amelia Patterson Frye

=== Assistant County Attorney (abolished office) ===
- First female: Margaret Lamm

=== District Attorney ===
- First female: Kay Huff in 1978
- First Native American (female): Dianne Baker Harrold

=== Political Office ===
- First openly lesbian female (Oklahoma House of Representatives): Kay Floyd in 2012

=== Oklahoma Bar Association ===
- First female vice-president: Jayne Montgomery in 1978
- First female president: Mona Salyer Lambird from 1990-1991

== Firsts in local history ==
- Irma J. Newburn: First female (and African American female) district judge in Western Oklahoma
- Kay Huff: First female to serve as a District Attorney for Cleveland, Garvin and McClain Counties, Oklahoma (1978)
- Kalyn Free: First Native American (female) to serve as the District Attorney for Haskell and Pittsburg Counties, Oklahoma
- Laura Austin Thomas: First female District Attorney for Logan and Payne Counties, Oklahoma (2014)
- Bernice Dona Berry Beckham: First female to serve as the Assistant District Attorney in Oklahoma City, Oklahoma
- Reta Strubhar: First female to serve as a Judge of the District Court of Canadian County, Oklahoma (1984)
- Ada Lois Sipuel Fisher: First African American female admitted to the University of Oklahoma College of Law (1948)
- Bernice Dona Berry Beckham: First female to serve as the Assistant District Attorney in Oklahoma City, Oklahoma
- Lisa Shaw: First female to become an Associate District Judge in Comanche County, Oklahoma (2014)
- Susie Pritchett: First female elected as a judge in Kingfisher County, Oklahoma
- Bernice Dona Berry Beckham: First female to serve as the Assistant District Attorney in Oklahoma City, Oklahoma
- Elizabeth Kerr: First female to serve as a judge in Edmond, Oklahoma [Oklahoma County, Oklahoma]
- Susie Pritchett: First female lawyer hired by Oklahoma County's Public Defender's Office
- Maxey Reilly: First female judge in Okfuskee County, Oklahoma (2017)
- Vicki Behenna: First female to serve as the District Attorney for Oklahoma County, Oklahoma (2022)
- Freddie "Fred" Andrews: First female judge in Pontomac County, Oklahoma
- Bernice Dona Berry Beckham: First female to serve as the Assistant District Attorney in Oklahoma City, Oklahoma
- Wilma Palmer: First African American female to serve as a Judge of the Tulsa County District Court, Oklahoma (2007)
- Chloe Eunice Passly Dilday: First female judge in Washington County, Oklahoma

== See also ==
- List of first women lawyers and judges in the United States
- Timeline of women lawyers in the United States
- Women in law

== Other topics of interest ==
- List of first minority male lawyers and judges in the United States
- List of first minority male lawyers and judges in Oklahoma
