= Lykins =

Lykins is a surname. Notable people with the surname include:

- Johnston Lykins (1800–1876), American politician
- James Edward Lykins, American sculptor
- Laura Lykins (born 1869/70), American lawyer
