= Chuck Mau =

Chinese-American politician and jurist

- Born: January 10, 1907; Chinatown, Honolulu, Territory of Hawaii
- Died: September 11, 1990 (aged 83)
- Education: University of Colorado (LLB)

Chuck Mau (January 10, 1907 – September 11, 1990) was a Chinese-American politician and jurist.

== Personal life ==
Chuck Mau was born in Chinatown, Honolulu as the son of Chinese immigrants. His mother died of influenza in 1918, and his father operated a small business. He received a scholarship to go to Mills School (now Mid-Pacific Institute) and graduated with a law degree from the University of Colorado. In 1950, he received the University of Colorado Alumni Award.

== Career ==
Chuck Mau was a founder of the modern Democratic Party of Hawaii and an early advocate of Hawaiian statehood. Working as a law clerk to justices of the Supreme Court of Hawaii from 1933 to 1936, Mau quickly was appointed to Deputy to the Attorney General of Hawaii, the first Asian-American to serve in the role. Eying a role in politics, he accepted an invitation from Juggie Heen to run for a role as Deputy Supervisor as a Democrat. He was elected to the Honolulu Board of Supervisors (now Honolulu City Council) and served from 1940 to 1946, and 1948 to 1950. There, he passed a bill for rent-control in an attempt to ease the effects of World War II.

Mau was also a part of future Hawaii Governor John A. Burns's "Cell Gang" along with Ernest Isao Murai, Mits Kido, and Jack Kawano. Along with others, the "cell gang" served as the planning group for what was to become the Hawaii Democratic Revolution of 1954, which permanently wrested control of state politics from landowners and Republican Party.

Mau was appointed Chairman of the Hawaii Democratic Party in 1948, As a delegate to the 1948 Democratic National Convention, he secured a unanimous vote for a resolution for immediate statehood in the party platform.

He was a judge for the United States Tax Court from 1948 to 1950. President Harry S. Truman later appointed him to the United States Court of Appeals for the First Circuit. Mau served from 1950 to 1951 before entering private practice.

== See also ==
- List of first minority male lawyers and judges in the United States
- List of first minority male lawyers and judges in Hawaii
