= List of first women lawyers and judges in North Dakota =

This is a list of the first women lawyer(s) and judge(s) in North Dakota. It includes the year in which the women were admitted to practice law (in parentheses). Also included are women who achieved other distinctions such becoming the first in their state to graduate from law school or become a political figure.

== Firsts in North Dakota's history ==
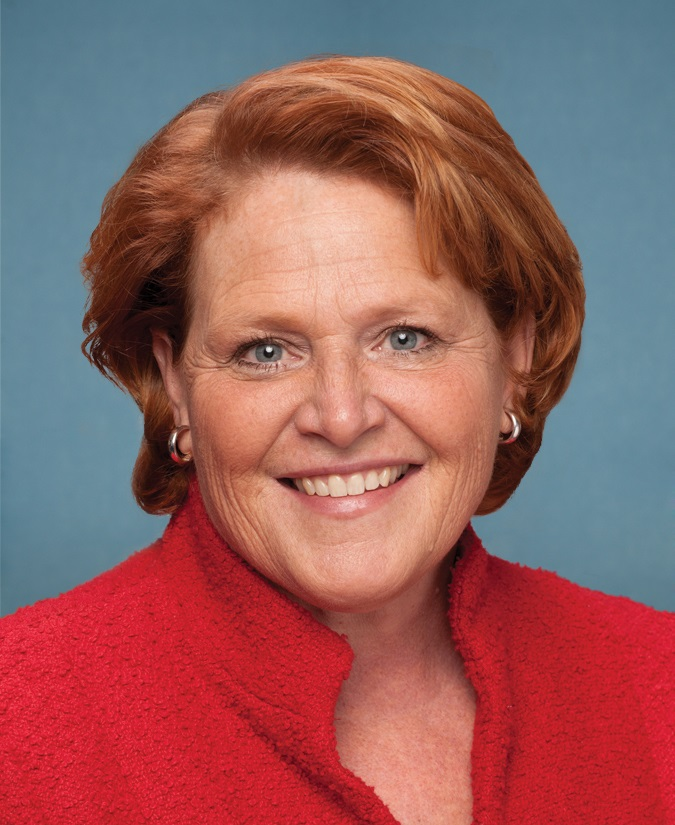
Heidi Heitkamp: First female Attorney General for North Dakota (1993)

=== Lawyers ===
- First female: Helen Hamilton (c. 1925)
- First female to argue before the North Dakota Supreme Court: Mildred Johnson (1939)

=== State judges ===
- First female (tribal judge for the Lakota on the Pine Ridge Reservation): Rose K. Ecoffey during the 1940s
- First female (North Dakota Supreme Court): Beryl J. Levine (1974) in 1985
- First female (district court): Cynthia A. Rothe-Seeger (1975) in 1988
- First female (Southwest Judicial District): Rhonda Ehlis in 2015
- First female (Southeast Judicial District): Cherie Clark in 2017
- First female (Chief Justice, North Dakota Supreme Court): Lisa McEvers in 2025

=== Federal judges ===
- First female (bankruptcy court): Shon Hastings in 2011

=== Attorney General for North Dakota ===
- First female: Heidi Heitkamp (1980) from 1993-2000

=== Political Office ===
- First female (U.S. Senate): Heidi Heitkamp (1980) in 2013

=== State Bar Association of North Dakota ===
- First female president: Rebecca Thiem in 1996

== Firsts in local history ==
- Rhonda Ehlis: First female appointed as a Judge of the Southwest Judicial District in North Dakota (2015) [Adams, Billings, Bowman, Dunn, Golden Valley, Hettinger, Slope and Stark Counties, North Dakota]
- Cherie Clark: First female judge appointed to the Southeast Judicial District [Barnes, Dickey, Eddy, Foster, Griggs, Kidder, LaMoure, Logan, McIntosh, Ransom, Richland, Sargent, Stutsman and Wells Counties]
- Cynthia A. Rothe-Seeger (1975): First female appointed as a Judge of the East Central Judicial District in North Dakota (1988) [Cass, Steele and Traill Counties, North Dakota]
- Beryl J. Levine (1974): First female to serve as the President of the Cass County Bar Association, North Dakota (1984)
- Haley Wamstad: First female elected as the state's attorney in Grand Forks County, North Dakota (2018)
- Robin A. Schmidt: First female district judge in McKenzie County, North Dakota (2013)
- Kirsten Sjue (2006): First female judge in Williams County, North Dakota (2015)

== See also ==
- List of first women lawyers and judges in the United States
- Timeline of women lawyers in the United States
- Women in law

== Other topics of interest ==
- List of first minority male lawyers and judges in the United States
- List of first minority male lawyers and judges in North Dakota
