= List of first minority male lawyers and judges in Hawaii =

This is a list of the first minority male lawyer(s) and judge(s) in Hawaii. It includes the year in which the men were admitted to practice law (in parentheses). Also included are other distinctions such as the first minority men in their state to graduate from law school or become a political figure.

== Firsts in Hawaii's history ==
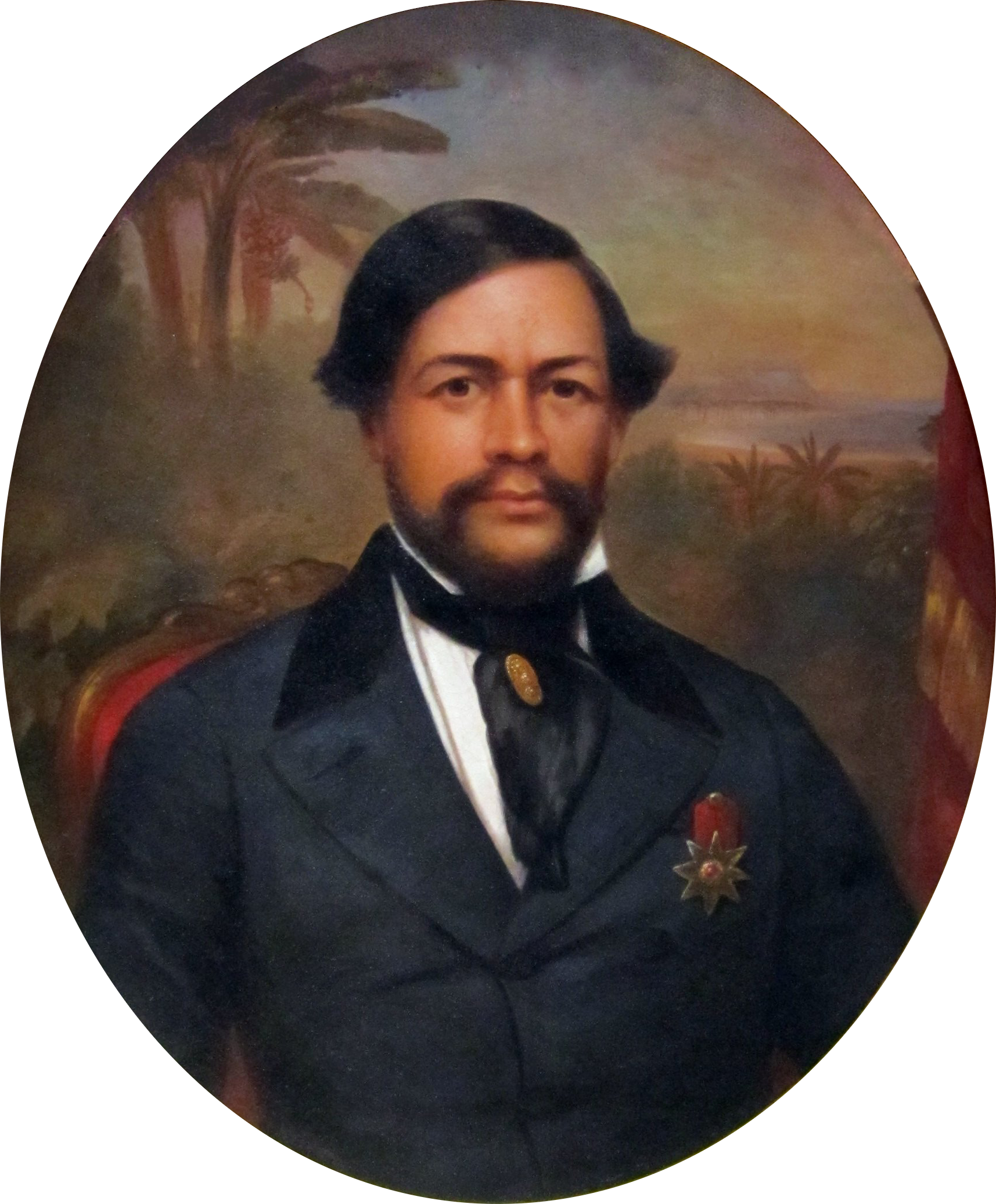
Kamehameha III: First male of Native Hawaiian descent to act as the Chief Justice of the Hawaii Supreme Court (1840)

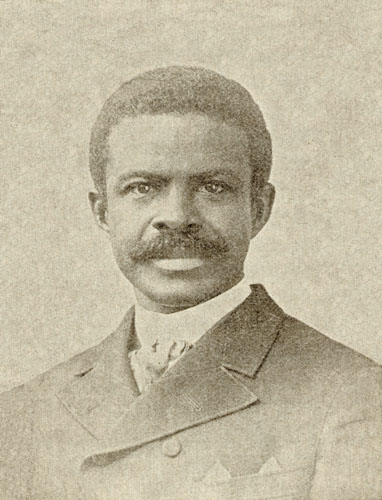
Thomas McCants Stewart: First African American male lawyer in Hawaii (1875)

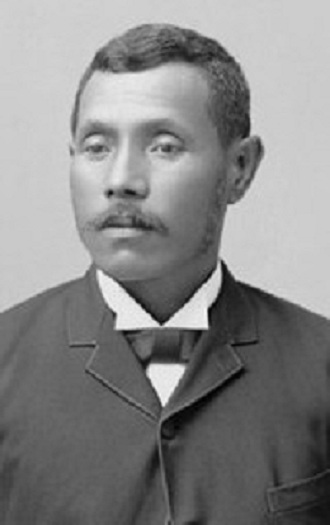
Joseph Nāwahī: First Native Hawaiian male lawyer in Hawaii (1888)

=== Lawyers ===
- First male of Japanese descent: Keigoro Katsura (c. 1855)
- First African American male: Thomas McCants Stewart (1875)
- First Native Hawaiian male: Joseph Nāwahī (c. 1888)
- First Chinese American male to practice before the Supreme Court of Hawaii: Anthony Yuen Seto (1916)
- First Filipino male: Pablo Manlapit (1919)

=== State judges ===
- First Native Hawaiian male (Chief Justice; Supreme Court of the Kingdom of Hawaii—Pre-statehood): Kamehameha III in 1840
- First Native Hawaiian males (Justices; Supreme Court of the Kingdom of Hawaii—Pre-statehood): Zorobabela Kaʻauwai, Pākī, Charles Kanaʻina and Jonah Kapena in 1842
- First Native Hawaiian male (Justice; Superior Court of the Kingdom of Hawaii—Pre-statehood): John Papa ʻĪʻī in 1848
- First African American male: William F. Crockett during the 1900s
- First Chinese American male (circuit court): William "Billy" Heen in 1917
- First Asian American male (magistrate): Tomekichi "Tom" Okino in 1934
- First Asian American male (Japanese descent) (First Circuit Court): Robert K. Murakami in 1953
- First Japanese American male (Supreme Court of Hawaii): Masaji Marumoto 1956-1960—Territory of Hawaii; 1967-1973)
- First Japanese American male (Chief Justice; Supreme Court of Hawaii): Wilfred Tsukiyama (c. 1924) in 1959
- First Chinese American (and Native Hawaiian) male (Chief Justice; Supreme Court of Hawaii): William S. Richardson in 1966
- First Filipino American male (circuit court): Ben Menor in 1968
- First Filipino American male (Supreme Court of Hawaii): Ben Menor in 1974
- First Native Hawaiian male (Hawaii Intermediate Court of Appeals): Walter Heen in 1982
- First Samoan American male (family court): Bode Uale in 1991
- First Korean American male (Chief Justice; Supreme Court of Hawaii): Ronald Moon in 1993

=== Federal judges ===
- First Chinese American male (United States Court of Appeals for the First Circuit): Chuck Mau in 1950
- First Japanese American male (U.S. Court of Claims): Shiro Kashiwa (1936) in 1972:
- First Asian American male (U.S. District Court for the District of Hawaii): Dick Yin Wong (1950) in 1975
- First Japanese American male (U.S. Court of Appeals for the Federal Circuit): Shiro Kashiwa (1936) in 1982
- First African American male (U.S. District Court for the District of Hawaii): Micah W.J. Smith in 2024

=== Attorney General of Hawaii ===
- First Native Hawaiian males (Kingdom of Hawaii): John Lot Kaulukou, Luther Aholo, and Antone Rosa from 1886-1887
- First Asian American male (Territory of Hawaii): Michiro Watanabe in 1952
- First Japanese American male (after statehood): Shiro Kashiwa (1936) in 1957
- First Korean American male: Tany S. Hong in 1981

=== Deputy Attorney General ===
- First Chinese American male: Chuck Mau circa 1936
- First Native Hawaiian male: Richard Bissen

=== United States Attorney ===
- First Japanese American male: Yoshimi Hayashi in 1967

=== Deputy Public Prosecutor ===
- First Asian American male: Ralph T. Yamaguchi in 1937

=== Political Office ===
- First male of Native Hawaiian descent (Governor of Hawaii): John D. Waiheʻe III (1976) from 1986-1994

=== Hawaii State Bar Association ===
- First Chinese male admitted to bar: Hong Yen Chang (1889)
- First Japanese American male to pass the bar exam: Arthur K. Ozawa (1910)
- First Filipino males admitted to bar: Peter Aduja and Ben Menor (1953)
- First Japanese American male (president): Masaji Marumoto in 1954

== Firsts in local history ==
- Masaji Marumoto: First Japanese American male to serve as the Honolulu City and County Attorney (1933)
- Ralph T. Yamaguchi: First Asian American male to serve as a deputy public prosecutor for the Honolulu district
- Ernest S. Ing: First Chinese American male to serve as a district judge in Waimea and Honolulu (Hawaii County and City and County of Honolulu)

== See also ==
- List of first minority male lawyers and judges in the United States

== Other topics of interest ==
- List of first women lawyers and judges in the United States
- List of first women lawyers and judges in Hawaii
