= Murai =

Murai may refer to:

- Murai (surname), Japanese surname
- Murai, Singapore, area in Western Water Catchment
- Murai Reservoir, Singapore reservoir
- Murai Station, Japan railway station

== See also ==
- Tirumurai, a Tamil-language Hindu (Shaivite) text from medieval India
