= Federal attorney =

Federal attorney may refer to:

In the United States,

- United States Attorney, who represent the government in US federal courts
- Licensed federal attorney, who are licensed to appear in federal courts
