= Hanapepe massacre =

Interethnic dispute in Kauaʻi, Hawaiʻi (1924)

Coordinates: 21.9005°N 159.5591°W

Hanapēpē Massacre
- Date: September 9, 1924
- Location: Hanapepe, Hawaii
- Goals: $2 daily wage 8 hour day

Parties
Striking Filipino sugar workers	Hawaiian Sugar Planters' Association; Kauai County Police Department

Lead figures
Pablo Manlapit	Jack Butler

Casualties and losses
Deaths: 16 killed Arrests: 161	Deaths: 4

The Hanapēpē Massacre (also called the Battle of Hanapēpē) occurred on September 9, 1924, when a dispute amongst Filipino strike organizers in Hanapēpē, Kaua'i, resulted in a violent exchange between local police officers and Filipinos. The conflict began when two Ilocano youth, allegedly breaking the Filipino-led labor strike, were detained and harassed by a group of Visayans at the Hanapepe strike camp. When the local police were called to settle the dispute, they arrived with a group of heavily armed special deputies. Upon arrival, the officers issued warrants of arrest for the two detained Illocanos, causing the collection of Filipino strikers to rally in opposition. Despite previously ridiculing the two Ilocanos, the remaining Filipinos armed themselves and demanded the boys be released. A violent exchange ensued wherein sixteen Filipino laborers and four police officers were left dead.

== Background ==
By the 1920s, the sugarcane plantation owners in Hawaiʻi had become disillusioned with both Japanese and Filipino workers. They spent the next few years trying to get the U.S. Congress to relax the Chinese Exclusion Act so that they could bring in new Chinese workers. Congress prevented the importation of Chinese labor.

Organized labor in the 1920s' U.S. mainland supported the Congress in this action, so that for a while it looked as though militant unionism on the sugarcane plantations was dead. To oppose organized labor, the Hawaiian Territorial Legislature passed the Criminal Syndicalism Law of 1919, Anarchistic Publications law of 1921, and the Anti-Picketing Law of 1923.

These laws, with penalties of up to 10 years in prison, increased the discontent of the workers. The Filipinos, who were rapidly becoming the dominant plantation labor force, had deep-seated grievances: as the latest immigrants they were treated most poorly. Although the planters had claimed there was a labor shortage and they were actively recruiting workers from the Philippines, they wanted only illiterate workers and turned back any arrivals who could read or write, as many as one in six.

== High Wage Movement ==
In the fall of 1922, Filipino labor activist Pablo Manlapit and George Wright, the head of the American Federation of Labor, founded the High Wage Movement (HWM). Building from the networks Manlapit established through the Filipino Labor Union (FLU), Manlapit and Wright drafted a petition of demands that garnered over 6,000 signatures. Primarily, the HWM demanded an increase of the minimum wage to two dollars alongside the reduction of the workday to eight hours. When their petition was ignored by the Hawaiian Sugar Planter's Association (HSPA) in 1923, the HWM proceeded with an organized labor strike in 1924.

As they had previously, the plantation owners used armed forces, the National Guard, and strike breakers paid a higher wage than the strikers demanded. Again workers were turned out of their homes. Propaganda was distributed to whip up racism. Spying and infiltration of the strikers' ranks was acknowledged by Jack Butler, executive head of the Hawaiian Sugar Planters' Association.

=== Violence at Hanapēpē ===
Strike leaders were arrested in attempts to disrupt workers' solidarity, and people were bribed to testify against them. On September 9, 1924, outraged strikers kidnapped two strike breakers at Hanapēpē and prevented them from going to work. The police, armed with clubs and guns, came to union headquarters to rescue them. Between 100 and 200 Filipino strikers were armed with pistols, knives, and clubs.

The Associated Press flashed the story of what followed across the United States in the following words:

Honolulu. - Twenty persons dead, unnumbered injured lying in hospital, officers under orders to shoot strikers as they approached, distracted widows with children tracking from jails to hospitals and morgues in search of missing strikers - this was the aftermath of a clash between cane strikers and workers on the McBryde plantation, Tuesday at Hanapepe, island of Kauai. The dead included sixteen Filipinos and four policemen.

== Aftermath ==
After the massacre police rounded up all male protesters they could find, and a total of 101 Filipino men were arrested. 76 were brought to trial, and of these 60 received four-year jail sentences. However, these numbers are disputed among historians, and another source claims 130 strikers and their leaders were arrested and tried, of which 56 were found guilty and imprisoned, with many later deported. Pablo Manlapit was charged with subornation of perjury and was sentenced to two to ten years in prison. The Hawaiʻi Hochi claimed that he had been railroaded into prison, a victim of framed-up evidence, perjured testimony, racial prejudice and class hatred. Shortly thereafter, he was paroled on condition that he leave Hawaiʻi. After eight months the strike disintegrated.

The Federationist, the official publication of the American Federation of Labor, reported that in 1924 the ten leading sugar companies listed on the New York Stock Exchange paid dividends averaging 17 percent. From 1913 to 1923, the eleven leading sugar companies paid cash dividends of 172.45 percent, and most of them issued large stock dividends.

After the 1924 strike, the labor movement in Hawaiʻi dwindled and discontent among the workers rarely surfaced again. Pablo Manlapit, who had been imprisoned and exiled, returned to the islands in 1932 and started a new labor organization, this time hoping to include other ethnic groups. But the time was not ripe in the Depression years. There were small nuisance strikes in 1933 that made no headway and involved mostly Filipinos. Protests since the massacre have discouraged carrying guns at demonstrations.

== Legacy ==
The burial site of the killed strikers was believed to have been found 95 years after the strike. Until then, the location of the graves was unknown, and a commemorative marker was placed in the Hanapepe Town Park in 2006. In 2024, The Kaua‘i County Planning Department commemorated the 100th anniversary of the 1924 Hanapēpē Massacre with a ceremony attended by nearly 150 participants, including officials, dignitaries, community members, and descendants.

=== 2019 grave discovery ===
On October 20, 2019, the Hawaii State Chapter of the Filipino American National Historical Society, assisted by a technician and an engineer, found a trench at the Hanapepe Filipino Cemetery which they believe may be the grave of twelve of the strikers. The finding was reported in West Hawaii Today, and the results were to be presented at the Filipino American National Historical Society biennial conference in Waikiki in July 2020. The researchers also said that they would continue research to identify the 16 strikers by combing through court records and Hawaii Sugar Planters' Association records.

== See also ==
- List of massacres in the United States
- Murder of workers in labor disputes in the United States
- List of incidents of civil unrest in the United States
