= List of first minority male lawyers and judges in South Dakota =

This is a list of the first minority male lawyer(s) and judge(s) in South Dakota. It includes the year in which the men were admitted to practice law (in parentheses). Also included are those who achieved other distinctions, such becoming the first in their state to graduate from law school or become a political figure.

== Firsts in South Dakota's history ==
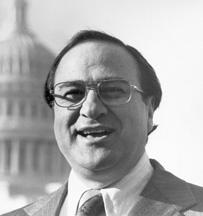
James Abourezk: First Lebanese American and Arab American male to serve as a U.S. Senator from South Dakota (1973)

=== Law degree ===
- First American Indian (Rosebud Sioux Tribe) male law graduate: Ramon Roubideaux in 1950

=== Lawyers ===
- First American Indian male (Sioux Nation): John T. Van Metre (1890)
- First African American male: Will F. Reden (1908)
- First African American male (admitted to State Bar of South Dakota): Madison Jackson
- A Sioux Indian male lawyer who is among the "First Thirteen" Native American lawyers to have argued federal Indian law cases before the U.S. Supreme Court: Terry L. Pechota (1972)

=== Judges ===
- First Native American males (Sioux Nation and Oglala): Clarence Three Stars (1915-1916) and James Ryan (1918-1920) respectively served as county judges
- First Native American male (Sisseton Wahpeton Oyate; South Dakota Unified Judicial System): Andrew Robertson in 2019

=== Assistant Attorney General ===
- First American Indian (Rosebud Sioux Tribe) male: Ramon Roubideaux c. 1951

=== United States Attorney ===
- First Native American males:Terry L. Pechota (1972) and Philip N. Hogen from 1979 to 1981 and 1981-1991 respectively

=== Political Office ===
- First Lebanese American and Arab American male (senator): James Abourezk (c. 1966) in 1973

== Firsts in local history ==
- Franklin Ducheneaux: First Native American male graduate of the University of South Dakota School of Law (1965) [Clay County, South Dakota]

== See also ==
- List of first minority male lawyers and judges in the United States

== Other topics of interest ==
- List of first women lawyers and judges in the United States
- List of first women lawyers and judges in South Dakota
