= Imura =

Imura (written: 井村 lit. "well village") is a Japanese surname. Notable people with the surname include:

- Mamoru Imura (井村 守, born 1948), Japanese inventor and businessman
- Masayo Imura (井村 雅代, born 1950), Japanese synchronized swimmer and coach
- Takenori Imura (born 1952), Japanese karateka
- Yudai Imura (井村 雄大, born 1991), Japanese footballer

== See also ==
- Murai (surname)
