= List of first women lawyers and judges in Arizona =

This is a list of the first women lawyer(s) and judge(s) in Arizona. It includes the year in which the women were admitted to practice law (in parentheses). Also included are women who achieved other distinctions, such as becoming the first in their state to graduate from law school or become a political figure.

== Firsts in Arizona's history ==
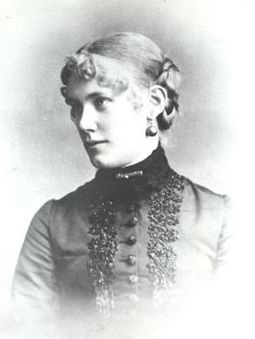
Sarah Herring Sorin: First female lawyer in Arizona (1892)

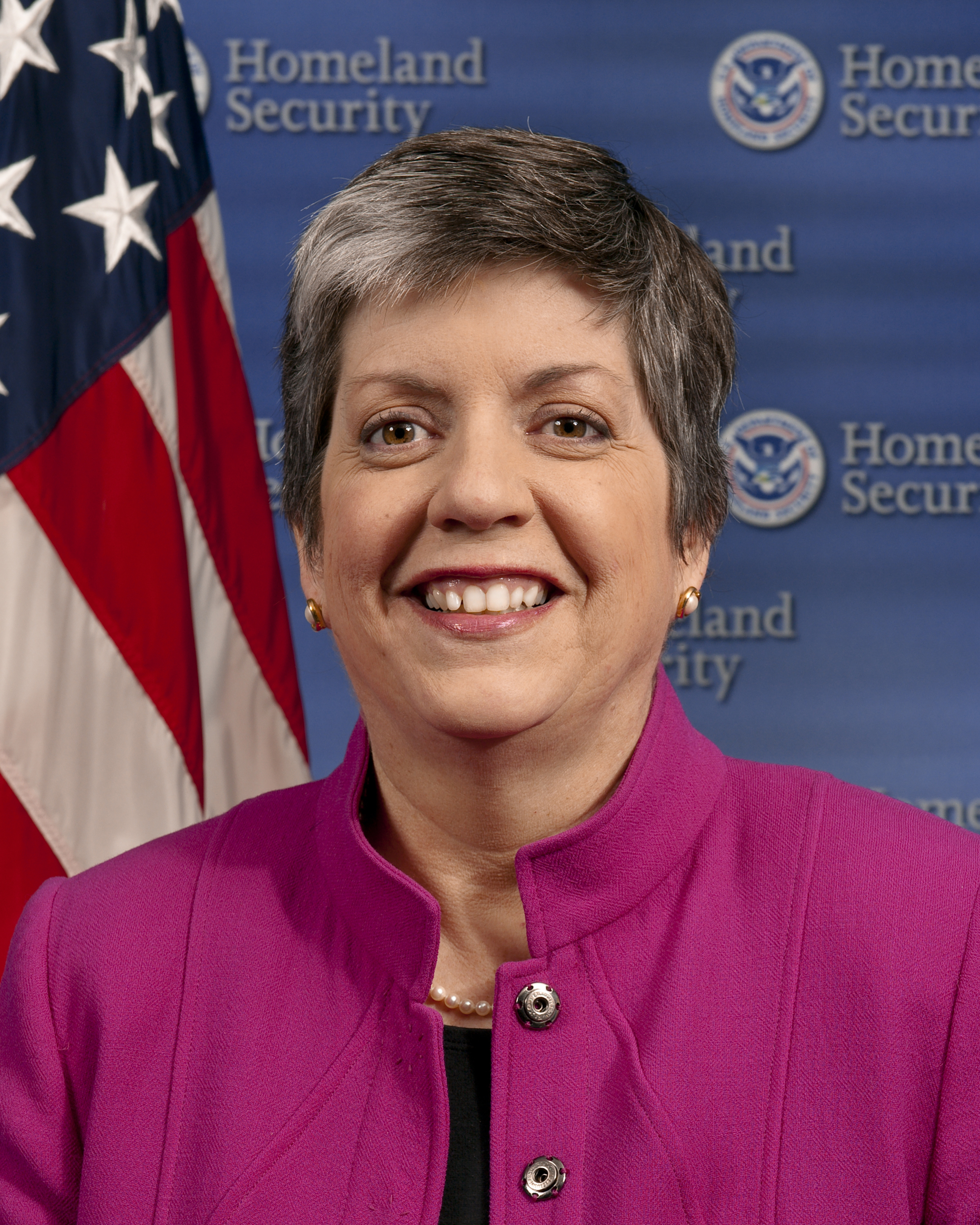
Janet Napolitano: First female attorney general for Arizona (1999)

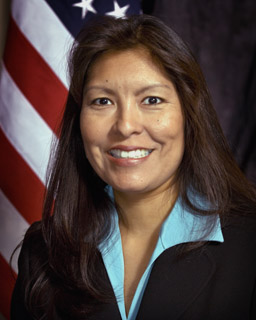
Diane Humetewa: First Native American (Hopi) female judge of the U.S. District Court for the District of Arizona (2014)

=== Lawyers ===
- First woman: Sarah Herring Sorin (1892)
- First Hispanic American woman: Mary Stella Cota-Robles (1940)
- First African American woman: Jean Williams (1949)
- First woman to serve as the chief staff attorney for the Supreme Court of Arizona: Sarah D. Grant
- First woman to start a practice on Arizona Indian Reservation and serve as general counsel to the Havasupai: Martha Blue (1967)
- First Asian American woman: Roxanne Song Ong (1979)

=== State judges ===
- First female justices of the peace: Nellie T. Bush and Emeline Ferguson in 1914
- First woman to unsuccessfully run for court superior court judge: Gertrude Converse in 1948
- First woman (Arizona Superior Court): Lorna E. Lockwood (1925) in 1950
- First Latino American woman (reputed): Anita Lewis Chávez (1947)
- First woman (chief justice of the Arizona Supreme Court): Lorna E. Lockwood (1925) in 1961
- First woman (Arizona Court of Appeals): Mary M. Schroeder in 1975
- First African American woman: Jean Williams (1949) in 1977
- First Asian American woman: Roxanne Song Ong (1979) circa 1986
- First African American woman (justice of the peace): Pamela Gutierrez in 1994
- First Native American (female) elected to the Arizona Superior Court: Gloria J. Kindig in 1996
- First Asian American woman (Arizona Superior Court): Rosa Mroz in 2004
- First Latino American woman (Arizona Court of Appeals): Patricia A. Orozco (1989) in 2004
- First openly lesbian woman: Tracey Nadzieja in 2018
- First Navajo woman (chief justice of tribal high court): Claudine Bates-Arthur (1970)
- First Muslim woman (justice of the peace pro tempore): Laila Ikram (2022)
- First African American (female) and Latino American woman (Arizona Supreme Court): Maria Elena Cruz in 2025

=== Federal judges ===
- First Latino American woman (U.S. District Court for the District of Arizona): Mary H. Murguia (1985) in 2000
- First Native American (Hopi) woman (U.S. District Court for the District of Arizona): Diane Humetewa (1993) in 2014
- First South Asian (female) (United States Court of Appeals for the Ninth Circuit): Roopali Desai in 2022

=== Attorney general of Arizona ===
- First woman: Janet Napolitano (1983) from 1999-2003

=== Assistant attorney general ===
- First woman: Pearl Collier in 1936

=== United States attorney ===
- First woman: Mary Anne Richey (née Reimann) in 1960
- First Native American (Hopi) woman: Diane Humetewa (1993) in 2007

=== Assistant United States attorney ===
- First woman: Mary Anne Richey (née Reimann) around 1954

=== County attorney ===
- First woman: Rose Sosnowsky Silver in 1969
- First Latino American woman: Patricia A. Orozco (1989) in 1999
- First Navajo (female): Jasmine Blackwater-Nygren in 2024

=== Assistant county attorney ===
- First woman: Loretta Savage Whitney in 1943

=== Political office ===
- First openly bisexual woman (elected to the U.S. Congress): Kyrsten Sinema (2005) in 2013

=== State bar of Arizona ===
- First woman (president): Roxana C. Bacon in 1991
- First openly lesbian woman (president): Amelia Craig Cramer in 2012
- First Asian American (female) (president): Lisa Loo (1988) in 2016
- First Latino American woman (president): Jessica Sanchez in 2022

== Firsts in local history ==
- Donna Grimsley: First woman to serve on the Apache County Superior Court, Arizona (2003)
- Jasmine Blackwater-Nygren: First Navajo woman to serve as the Apache County attorney (2024)
- Ann Littrell: First female to serve on the Cochise County Superior Court in Arizona
- Helen Colton: First female judge in Coconino County, Arizona (1919)
- Ann Kirkpatrick (1979): First female deputy county attorney for Coconino County, Arizona
- Daisy Flores: First female county attorney in Gila County, Arizona
- Monica Lynn Stauffer: First female to serve on the Superior Court of Greenlee County, Arizona (1998)
- Jessica Quickle: First female judge in La Paz County, Arizona (2018)
- Anita Lewis Chávez (1947): Reputed to be the first Latino American female lawyer in Maricopa County, Arizona
- Gloria Ybarra: First Hispanic woman to serve on the Maricopa County Superior Court, Arizona (1985)
- Sarah D. Grant: First woman to serve as the presiding criminal judge in the Maricopa County Superior Court
- Rosa Mroz: First Asian American woman to serve on the Maricopa County Superior Court (2004)
- Barbara Rodriguez Mundell: First Hispanic woman to serve as the presiding judge of Maricopa County, Arizona (2005)
- Roxanne Song Ong: First Asian woman to serve as the presiding judge of the Phoenix Municipal Court (Maricopa County, Arizona; 2005)
- Allister Adel: First woman to serve as the county attorney of Maricopa County, Arizona (2019)
- Charlotte Wells: First female judge in Mohave County, Arizona (2002)
- Carolyn Holliday: First woman elected to the Superior Court of Navajo County, Arizona, (1996) and serve as its presiding judge (1999)
- Mary Anne Richey (née Reimann): First woman to serve as the deputy county attorney in Pima County, Arizona (1952)
- Alice Truman: First female justice of the peace and judge in Pima County, Arizona (1962)
- Rose Sosnowsky Silver: First woman appointed as the Pima County attorney (1969)
- Barbara LaWall (1976): First woman elected as the Pima County attorney (1996)
- Lina Rodriguez (1977): First Hispanic American to serve on the Pima County Superior Court, Arizona (1984)
- Laine Sklar: First female magistrate in Marana, Arizona (c. 2006) (Pima County, Arizona)
- Margarita Bernal (c. 1979): First Latino American woman to serve as a municipal court judge in Tucson, Arizona (Pima County, Arizona)
- Anna Montoya-Paez: First woman elected to the Santa Cruz County Superior Court, Arizona
- Sheila Polk (1982): First woman to serve as the Yavapai County attorney (2004)
- Nellie T. Bush and Emeline Ferguson: First women elected as justices of the peace in Yuma County, Arizona (1914)
- Patricia A. Orozco (1989): First Latino American woman appointed as the county attorney for Yuma County, Arizona (1999)

== See also ==
- List of first women lawyers and judges in the United States
- Timeline of women lawyers in the United States
- Women in law

== Other topics of interest ==
- List of first minority male lawyers and judges in the United States
- List of first minority male lawyers and judges in Arizona
