= Blanche Colman =

American lawyer

Blanche Colman (1884–1978) was South Dakota's first female lawyer.

She was born in 1884 in the Deadwood, Dakota Territory to Nathan and Amalia Colman, who were German/Jewish immigrants. Her father Nathan was a miner who eventually became a justice of the peace and a rabbi for the town's Jewish population. She completed high school in 1902, and soon after was selected by Congressman William Parker to serve as his secretary in Washington, D.C. She returned to South Dakota and began working for the legal department of the Homestake Mining Company in Leads. While climbing up in the company from clerk to legal assistant, Colman became an autodidact of law by studying in the office of Chambers Kellar, Esq. On October 3, 1911, she became the first female admitted to the South Dakota Bar Association. She remained as a lawyer for the Homestake Mining Company, and worked with Kellar on countless mining-related cases that pertained labor litigation and water rights until 1950 when she started her own legal practice.

Colman died in 1978.

== See also ==
- List of first women lawyers and judges in South Dakota
