= List of first minority male lawyers and judges in Arizona =

This is a list of the first minority male lawyer(s) and judge(s) in Arizona. It includes the year in which the men were admitted to practice law (in parentheses). Also included are other distinctions, such as the first minority men in their state to graduate from law school or become a political figure.

== Firsts in Arizona's history ==
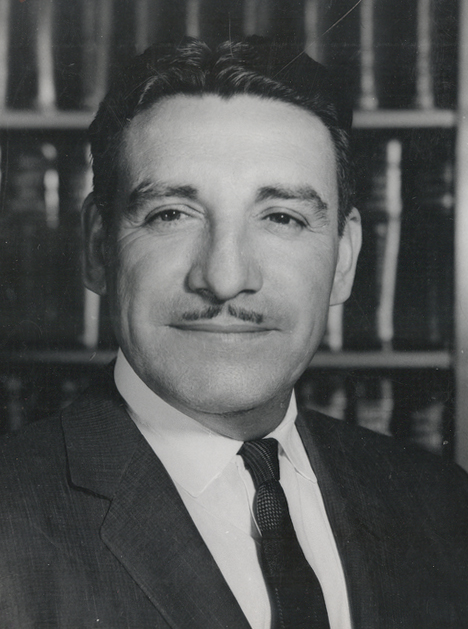
Raúl Héctor Castro: First Mexican American male to serve as a superior court judge in Arizona (1959)

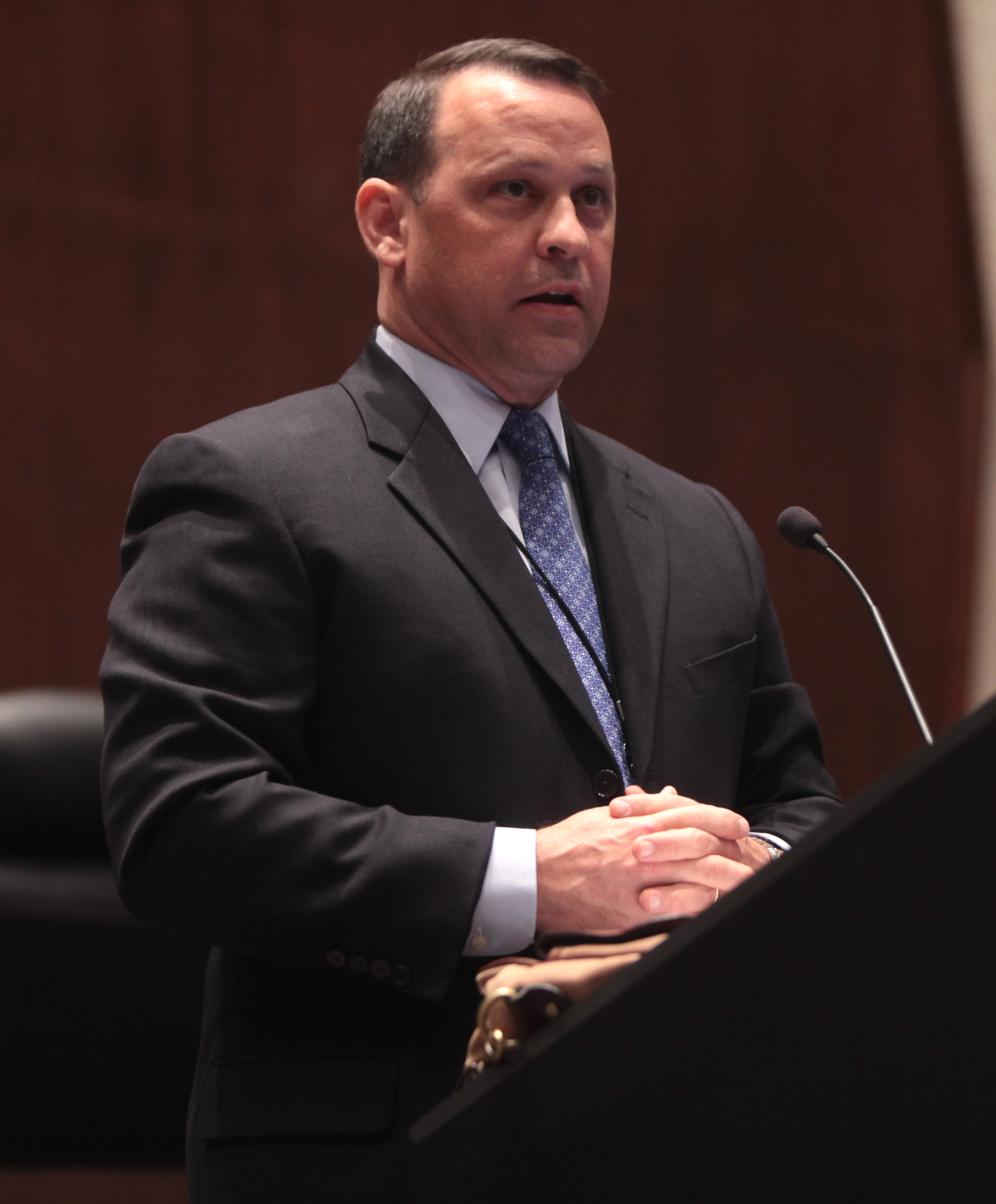
John Lopez IV: First Latino American male justice of the Arizona Supreme Court (2016)

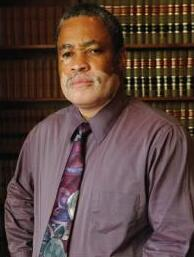
Raner Collins (1975): First African American male to serve as chief judge of the United States District Court for the District of Arizona (2013)

=== Lawyers ===
- First African American men: William Watkins (1921) and Hayzel Burton Daniels (1948)
- First Hispanic American man: Joseph C. Padilla (1936)
- First Asian American man: Wing F. Ong (1943):
- First Native American (Pascua Yaqui Tribe) man: Lawrence Huerta (1953)
- First Native American (Navajo) man: Benjamin W. Hanley (1971)
- First Native American (Gila River Indian Community) man: Rodney B. Lewis (1972)
- First undocumented man: Daniel Rodriguez in 2014

=== State judges ===
- First Jewish American man: Charles C. Bernstein (1929) in 1946
- First Mexican American man (Superior Court of Arizona): Raúl Héctor Castro (1949) in 1959
- First Jewish American man (Supreme Court of Arizona; chief justice): Charles C. Bernstein (1929) in 1962
- First Asian American man (Superior Court): Thomas Tang in 1962
- First African American man: Hayzel Burton Daniels (1948) in 1965
- First Hispanic American man (Arizona Appeals Court): Joe W. Contreras in 1979
- First African American man (Arizona Appeals Court): Cecil B. Patterson Jr. (1971) in 1985
- First Latino American man (Supreme Court of Arizona): John Lopez IV (1998) in 2016

=== Federal judges ===
- First Asian American man (U.S. Court of Appeals for the Ninth Circuit in Arizona): Thomas Tang (1950) in 1977
- First Hispanic American man (U.S. District Court): Valdemar Aguirre Cordova (1950) in 1979
- First African American man (chief judge; U.S. District Court): Raner Collins (1975) in 2013
- First Asian American man (Article III judge; U.S. District Court for the District of Arizona): Sharad H. Desai in 2024

=== Attorney general of Arizona ===
- First African American man (counsel at the Arizona Attorney General's Office): Cecil B. Patterson Jr. (1971)
- First Jewish American man: Tom Horne (1970) 2011-2015

=== Assistant attorneys general ===
- First Hispanic American man: Albert García (1937)
- First African American man: Hayzel Burton Daniels (1948)

=== County attorney ===
- First Mexican American man: Raúl Héctor Castro (1949) 1954-1959

=== Political office ===
- First Mexican American man (governor of Arizona): Raúl Héctor Castro (1949) 1975-1977

=== State bar of Arizona ===
- First Asian American man (president): Thomas Tang in 1977
- First Latino American man (president): Ernest Calderón in 2002
- First African American man (president): Benjamin Taylor in 2023

== Firsts in local history ==
- Greg Garcia: Reputed to be the first Hispanic American male lawyer in Maricopa County, Arizona
- Valdemar Aguirre Cordova (1950): First Hispanic American male judge in Maricopa County, Arizona (1965)
- Cecil B. Patterson Jr. (1971): First African American man to serve on the Maricopa County Superior Court
- Kevin Kane: First openly LGBT man to serve on the Phoenix Municipal Court (2006)
- Raúl Héctor Castro (1949): First Mexican American man to serve on the Superior Court of Pima County, Arizona (1959)
- Rubin Salter, Jr.: First African American male lawyer in Tucson, Pima County, Arizona (c. 1964)
- Harry Gin: First Chinese American man to serve on the Superior Court of Pima County, Arizona (1975)
- James Don: First Chinese American man to serve as the Pinal County attorney and a judge of the Pinal County Superior Court, Arizona

== See also ==
- List of first minority male lawyers and judges in the United States

== Other topics of interest ==
- List of first women lawyers and judges in the United States
- List of first women lawyers and judges in Arizona
