= List of first women lawyers and judges in South Dakota =

This is a list of the first women lawyer(s) and judge(s) in South Dakota. It includes the year in which the women were admitted to practice law (in parentheses). Also included are women who achieved other distinctions such becoming the first in their state to graduate from law school or become a political figure.

== Firsts in South Dakota's history ==
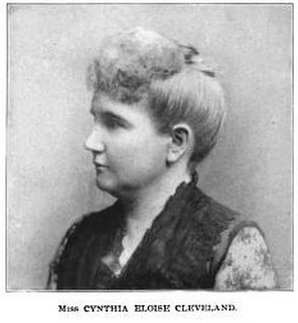
Cynthia Eloise Cleveland: First female admitted to practice law in the Dakota Territory (1883)

=== Lawyers ===
- First female (bar in the Dakota Territory): Cynthia Eloise Cleveland (1883)
- First female (South Dakota after statehood): Estelle Julia Owen (March 1893), Nellie A. Douglass (June 1893)
- First female to take exam before the South Dakota Supreme Court: Katie Rockford (1897)
- First female to practice before South Dakota's federal courts: Dorothy Rehfeld

=== State judges ===
- First female: Mildred Ramynke (1939) in 1958
- First female (Fifth Judicial District): Mildred Ramynke (1939) in 1975
- First female (Supreme Court of South Dakota): Judith Meierhenry (1977) in 2002

=== Federal judges ===
- First female (U.S. District Judge for the District of South Dakota): Karen Schreier in 1999

=== Assistant Attorney General ===
- First female: Frances "Fran" Lowenstein

=== United States Attorney ===
- First female: Karen Schreier in 1993

=== State Bar of South Dakota ===
- First female admitted: Blanche Colman (1911)
- First female presidents: Stephanie Pochop and Pamela Reiter respectively from 2016-2017 and 2017-2018

== Firsts in local history ==
- Mildred Ramynke (1939): First female appointed as a Judge of the Fifth Judicial District (1975) [Day, Grant, Marshall and Roberts Counties, South Dakota]
- Marjorie Breeden (1907): First female to graduate from the University of South Dakota Law School in Clay County, South Dakota
- Linda Lea M. Viken: First female to serve as a Magistrate Judge for Pennington County, South Dakota
- Shawn Pahlke: First female to serve as the Director of the Pennington County Public Defender’s Office, South Dakota
- Lara Roetzel: First female to serve as Pennington County’s State’s Attorney (2025)

== See also ==
- List of first women lawyers and judges in the United States
- Timeline of women lawyers in the United States
- Women in law

== Other topics of interest ==
- List of first minority male lawyers and judges in the United States
- List of first minority male lawyers and judges in South Dakota
