= List of first minority male lawyers and judges in the United States =

This is a list of the first minority male lawyer(s) and judge(s) in each state. It includes the year in which the men were admitted to practice law (in parentheses). Also included are other distinctions such as the first minority men in their state to graduate from law school.

== Firsts nationwide ==
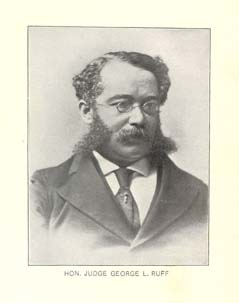
George Lewis Ruffin: First African American male law school graduate in the United States (1869)

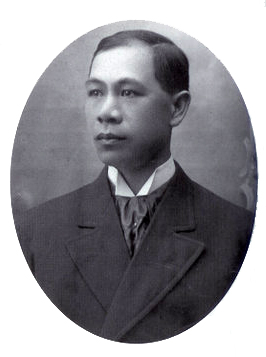
Hong Yen Chang: First male lawyer of Chinese descent in the United States (1888)

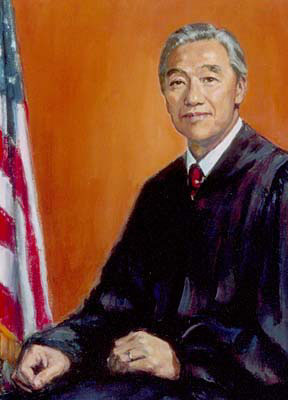
Herbert Choy: First Korean American male lawyer in the United States (1941)

=== Law school ===
See Law school in the United States

=== Lawyers ===
- First Jewish American male lawyers: Moses Levy (1778) and Zalegman Phillips (1779)
- First Native American (Choctaw) male lawyer: James McDonald (c. 1820s)
- First African American male lawyers: Moses Simons (1816) and Macon Bolling Allen (1844)
- First African American male lawyer to win a jury trial: Robert Morris (1847) in 1848
- First male lawyer of Czech descent: Augustin Haidusek (c. 1870)
- First African American male lawyer called to the English Bar: Thomas Morris Chester (1870)
- First deaf male lawyer: Joseph G. Parkinson (1880)
- First Turkish American male lawyer: James Ben Ali Haggin (c. 1880s)
- First Chinese male lawyer: Hong Yen Chang (1888)
- First Native American (Creek people) male admitted to practice before the federal courts: Albert Gallatin "Cheesie" McIntosh (1889) during the early 1900s
- First Japanese American male lawyer: Masuji Miyakawa (1905)
- First male lawyer of Croat descent: Anthony Lucas (1906)
- First Filipino male admitted to an American bar association: Ponciano Reyes (1907)
- First African American deaf male lawyer: Roger Demosthenes O'Kelly (1908)
- First Filipino male admitted to practice before the federal courts of the U.S.: Mariona Ylano (1915)
- First Filipino American male lawyer: Pablo Manlapit (1919)
- First Latino American male lawyer: Dennis Chávez (1920)
- First Navajo male lawyer: Thomas Dodge (1924)
- First Korean American male lawyer: Herbert Choy (1941)
- First African American male lawyer (U.S. Department of Justice): Martin A. Martin in 1943
- First blind male lawyer: Leonard Staisey (c. 1950)
- First Persian American male lawyer: Manoucher Farzan (1954)
- First African American male lawyer in the U.S. Department of Justice's Civil Rights Division: Thelton Henderson (1962)
- First openly gay male lawyer: Harris L. Kimball
- First African American male lawyer in the U.S. Coast Guard: Samuel E. Burton in 1974
- First Hmong American male lawyer: Christopher Thang Tao (c. 1986)
- First Nepali American male lawyer: Khagendra Gharti-Chhetry (1987)
- First U.S.-educated Uyghur American male lawyer: Nury Turkel (c. 1990s)
- First undocumented immigrant male admitted to practice law in the U.S.: Sergio C. Garcia (2014)

==== Lawyers and the U.S. Supreme Court ====
- First Native American male admitted to practice before the U.S. Supreme Court: Elias Cornelius Boudinot (1856) during the 1860s
- First African American male admitted to practice before the U.S. Supreme Court: John Rock (1861) in 1865
- First African American male to argue a case before the U.S. Supreme Court: Samuel R. Lowery (1874) in 1880
- First African American male from any western state to argue a case before the U.S. Supreme Court: William Henry Twine in 1898
- First Native American (Omaha people) male to argue a case before the U.S. Supreme Court: Thomas L. Sloan (1892) in 1904
- First Greek American male admitted to practice before the U.S. Supreme Court: Soterios Nicholson in 1917
- First Chinese American male to practice before the U.S. Supreme Court: You Chung Hong (1923) in 1933
- First African American male to argue and win a case before the U.S. Supreme Court: Charles Hamilton Houston (1924)
- First visually-impaired male admitted to practice before the U.S Supreme Court: N. Neal Pike around 1937
- First Latino American male to argue a case before the U.S. Supreme Court: Manuel Ruiz (1930) in 1952
- First Asian American to argue a case before the U.S. Supreme Court: Benjamim Gim (c. 1949) in 1957
- First Arab male to practice before the U.S. Supreme Court: Taher Helmy in 1979
- First deaf male to argue a case before the U.S. Supreme Court: Michael A. Chatoff (c. 1960s) in 1982
- First Native American (Gila River Indian Community) male to win a U.S. Supreme Court case: Rodney B. Lewis (1972) in (1980)
- First openly gay male to argue a case before the U.S. Supreme Court: John Ward in 1995
- First male with cerebral palsy to argue a case before the U.S. Supreme Court: Randall M. Howe at around 2006
- First Sikh male lawyer to argue a case before the U.S. Supreme Court: Tejinder Singh in 2014
- First undocumented male to argue a case before the U.S. Supreme Court: Luis Cortes Romero in 2019

=== Law clerks ===
See Lists of law clerks of the Supreme Court of the United States

=== State judges ===
- First Jewish American male judges: Daniel Nunez (1722) and Issac Miranda (1727)
- First African American male justice of the peace: Wentworth Cheswill (1805)
- First African American male judge: Macon Bolling Allen (1844) in 1847
- First African American male elected as a county judge in the South since Reconstruction: James Dean (1884) in 1888
- First Italy-born male judge: John Palmieri in 1904
- First Chinese American male judge: William "Billy" Heen in 1917
- First Portuguese American male judge: Frank M. Silvia in 1920
- First Greek American male judge: John C. Pappas in 1935
- First African American male judge in the South since Reconstruction: Lawson E. Thomas (1923) in 1950
- First Asian Indian-American elected male judge: Dalip Singh Saund in 1950
- First Japanese American male judge in the contiguous U.S.: John Aiso (1941) in 1952
- First Chinese American male judge in the contiguous U.S.: Delbert E. Wong (1948) in 1959
- First Syrian Lebanese American male judge: Elias Shamon during the 1960s
- First openly gay male judge: Stephen Lachs (1963) in 1979
- First African American male elected as a probate judge: William McKinley Branch in 1970
- First African American male to head a state level court system: Theodore R. Newman Jr. in 1976
- First Filipino American male judge: Mel Red Recana (1974) in 1981
- First Muslim American male judge: Adam Shakoor in 1981
- First Cuban American male to serve as an appellate court judge: Mario Goderich in 1990
- First Samoan American male family court judge: Bode Uale in 1991
- First Haitian American male: Jacques Leroy in 1994
- First African American male to preside over an American courtroom television show: Joe Brown in 1998
- First Lebanese-born male judge: James A. Kaddo in 1998
- First openly gay male to preside over an American courtroom television show: David Young in 2007
- First Hmong American male judge: Paul C. Lo (1994) in 2013
- First Zoroastrian male judge: Firdaus Dordi in 2017
- First openly bisexual male judge: Mike Jacobs in 2018
- First Palestinian American male judge: Abdel Majid Abdel Hadi in 2019
- First Burmese American male judge: Bryant Y. Yang in 2020
- First Yemeni American male judge: Rashad Hauter in 2021
- First openly transgender male judge: Seth Marnin in 2023
- First turbaned Sikh male judge: Raj Singh Badesha in 2024

==== State supreme courts ====
- First Jewish American male (chief justice): Henry A. Lyons in 1852 [resigned the same year]
- First Jewish American male (to serve a prolonged tenure as chief justice): Franklin J. Moses Sr. from 1868-1877
- First African American male: Jonathan Jasper Wright (1865) in 1870
- First Hispanic American male (chief justice): Eugene D. Lujan in 1951
- First Native American male (chief justice): Napoleon B. Johnson in 1953
- First Japanese American male: Masaji Marumoto in 1956
- First Japanese American male (chief justice): Wilfred Tsukiyama (c. 1924) in 1959
- First Chinese American (and Native Hawaiian) male (chief Justice): William S. Richardson in 1966
- First Filipino American male: Ben Menor in 1974
- First African American male (chief justice): Robert N. C. Nix Jr. (c. 1954) in 1984
- First Puerto Rican male (chief justice): Luis D. Rovira in 1990
- First Korean American male (justice and chief justice): Ronald Moon in 1990 and 1993 respectively
- First blind male (who was also Jewish): Richard B. Teitelman (1973) in 2002
- First openly gay male: Rives Kistler (1981) in 2003

=== Federal judges ===
- First Jewish American male (federal judge): Jacob Trieber in 1900
- First African American male (federal judge): William H. Hastie (1931) in 1937
- First Asian American (Chinese) federal judge: Chuck Mau in 1950
- First Greek American male (federal judge/chief judge): Thomas Demetrios Lambros in 1967 and 1990 respectively
- First Korean American male (federal judge): Herbert Choy (1941) in 1971
- First Pacific Islander male (magistrate judge): Richard R. Komo in 1971
- First Japanese American male (federal judge): Shiro Kashiwa (1936) in 1972
- First African American male (chief judge): William B. Bryant (1939) in 1977
- First Chinese American male (federal judge) from the contiguous U.S.: Thomas Tang (1950) in 1977
- First Filipino American male (federal judge): Alfred Laureta in 1978
- First African American male in the Deep South (federal judge): Robert Frederick Collins in 1978
- First Mexican American male (federal judge/U.S. Court of Appeals): Reynaldo Guerra Garza (1939) in 1961 and 1979 respectively
- First Cape Verdean male (federal judge): George N. Leighton in 1976
- First Puerto Rican male (continental U.S.): José A. Cabranes (1965) in 1979
- First Native American male [likely Cherokee Nation] (federal judge): Frank Howell Seay in 1979
- First African American male to head a Deep South federal court: James Lopez Watson during the 1980s-1990s
- First Armenian American male (federal judge): Dickran Tevrizian (1965) in 1985
- First Asian American/Pacific Islander male in the continental U.S. (magistrate judge): George H. King in 1987
- First Native American male [Choctaw Nation of Oklahoma] (federal judge): Michael Burrage (1974) in 1994
- First Cuban American male (federal judge): Eduardo C. Robreno (1978) in 1992
- First Armenian immigrant male (federal judge): Samuel Der-Yeghiayan (1978) in 2003
- First Haitian American male (Article III): Raymond Lohier in 2010
- First openly gay male (federal judge): Joseph H. Gale in 2011
- First openly gay African American male (federal judge): Darrin P. Gayles (1993) in 2014
- First Muslim American male (federal judge): Mustafa T. Kasubhai in 2018
- First South Asian American male (Article III in the Eleventh Circuit): Anuraag Singhal (1989) in 2019
- First Panamanian American male (Article III): Franklin U. Valderrama in 2020
- First Muslim American and Pakistani American male (Article III): Zahid Quraishi in 2021

==== Federal District court ====
- First African American male: James Benton Parsons (1949) in 1961
- First Chinese American male: Dick Yin Wong (1950) in 1975
- First blind male: Richard C. Casey (1958) in 1997
- First South Asian American male: Amul Thapar (1994) in 2007
- First Asian American male outside of the Ninth Circuit: Denny Chin (1978) in 2010
- First openly gay male: J. Paul Oetken (1991) in 2011

==== U.S. Court of Federal Claims ====
- First Latino American male: Armando Bonilla in 2021

==== Federal Circuit Court ====
- First Chinese American male: Chuck Mau in 1950
- First Filipino American male: Ben Menor in 1968
- First Latino American male (U.S. Court of Appeals for the Ninth Circuit): Arthur Alarcón in 1979
- First Latino American male (United States Court of Appeals for the Third Circuit): Julio M. Fuentes (1975) in 2000
- First openly gay male: Todd M. Hughes (1992) in 2013

==== Bankruptcy Court ====
- First African American male: Harry G. Hackett in 1954
- First Asian American/Pacific Islander male: Jon Chinen in 1976
- First Asian American male (of Chinese descent): Robert Kwan in 2007

==== U.S. Customs Court ====
- First African American male: Irvin Charles Mollison (1923) in 1945

==== U.S. Tax Court ====
- First Asian American (Chinese) male: Chuck Mau in 1948
- First Latino American male: Juan F. Vasquez in 1995
- First African American male: Maurice B. Foley in 1995

==== U.S. Court of Appeals ====
- First Jewish American male: Julian Mack in 1911
- First Mexican American male: Reynaldo Guerra Garza (1939) in 1979
- First African American male (U.S. Court of Appeals for the Sixth Circuit): Wade H. McCree (1948) in 1966
- First Japanese American male: A. Wallace Tashima (1961) in 1995
- First blind male: David S. Tatel (1966) in 1994
- First African American male (U.S. Court of Appeals for the Fourth Circuit): Roger Gregory (1978) in 2000
- First South Asian American male: Sri Srinivasan (1995) in 2013
- First Asian American male (U.S. Court of Appeals for the Fifth Circuit): James C. Ho in 2018

==== U.S. Supreme Court ====
- First Jewish American male: Louis Brandeis (1878) in 1916
- First African American male: Thurgood Marshall (1933) in 1967

==== Judge Advocate General of the U.S. Army ====
- First Chinese American male: John Fugh (1960) from 1991-1993

==== U.S. Military ====
- First Asian American male (Chief Judge; United States Armed Forces): Benes Z. Aldana in 2016

=== Attorneys General of the U.S. ===
See United States Attorney General

=== Deputy Attorney General of the U.S. ===
- First African American male: Eric Holder (1976) from 1997-2001

=== Associate Attorney General of the U.S. ===
- First African American male: Wayne Budd from 1992-1993

=== Deputy Associate Attorney General of the U.S. ===
- First Chinese American male: Nelson Dong (1974) from 1979-1980

=== Assistant Attorney General of the U.S. ===
- First African American male: William H. Lewis (c. 1890s) in 1910
- First Latino American male: Jimmy Gurulé in 1990

==== Civil Rights Division ====
- First Asian American male: Bill Lann Lee from 1997-2001
- First Latino American male: R. Alexander Acosta from 2003-2005
- First immigrant and Korean American male: Wan J. Kim from 2005-2007

=== Special Assistant to the U.S. Attorney General ===
- First Chinese American male: Nelson Dong (1974) from 1978-1979

=== Solicitor General of the U.S. ===
- First Jewish American male: Philip Perlman in 1947
- First African American male: Thurgood Marshall (1933) in 1965
- First Asian American male: Noel Francisco (1996) in 2017

=== State Attorneys General ===
- First African American male: Edward Brooke (1948) in 1962
- First Korean American male: Tany S. Hong in 1981
- First Native American male: Larry Echo Hawk in 1991
- First Sikh American male: Gurbir Grewal (1999) in 2018

=== State Deputy Attorney General ===
- First Chinese American male: Chuck Mau around 1936

=== United States Attorneys ===
- First African American male: Cecil F. Poole (1939) in 1961
- First African American male in the South since Reconstruction Mickey Michaux (1964) in 1977
- First Native American male (Sioux Indian): Terry L. Pechota (1972) from 1979-1981
- First Chinese American male: Norman Bay (1986) from 2000-2001
- First Indian American male: Amul Thapar in 2006–2008
- First Armenian American male: Richard S. Hartunian from 2010–2017
- First Korean American male: B.J. Pak from 2017-2021

=== State District Attorney (Prosecuting Attorney) ===
- First African American male: Percy J. Langster in 1948
- First Asian American male: Peter A. Chang, Jr. in 1966

=== State Assistant District Attorney ===
- First blind male: Leonard Staisey (1948) in 1950

=== State County Attorney ===
- First Korean American male: John C. Choi (1995) in 2011

=== State Public Defender ===
- First Hispanic American male: Carlos J. Martinez in 2008

=== American Bar/Federal Bar Association (Presidents, Member, or Officer) ===
- First Filipino male (Member - ABA): Francisco Afan Delgado in 1919
- First African American male nominated since 1912 (Member - ABA): James S. Watson in 1943
- First African American male (Member - FBA): Louis Rothschild Mehlinger in 1945
- First African American male (President - FBA): J. Clay Smith Jr. in 1980
- First Hispanic American male (President - FBA): Russell A. Del Toro in 2001
- First Asian American male (Officer - ABA): Marvin S. C. Dang when he became the Secretary in 2023
- First Native American (Pawnee) male to lead a national non-minority bar association (FBA): Lawrence R. Baca in 2009

See also List of presidents of the American Bar Association

=== State Bar Association (Presidents) ===
- First African American male: Wayne Budd from 1979-1980
- First African American male (elected): John A. Howard from 1981-1982
- First openly gay male: Mark Johnson in 1998
- First American male of South Asian descent: Rajeev Majumdar in 2019

== Firsts in individual states ==
- List of first minority male lawyers and judges in Alabama
- List of first minority male lawyers and judges in Alaska
- List of first minority male lawyers and judges in Arizona
- List of first minority male lawyers and judges in Arkansas
- List of first minority male lawyers and judges in California
- List of first minority male lawyers and judges in Colorado
- List of first minority male lawyers and judges in Connecticut
- List of first minority male lawyers and judges in Delaware
- List of first minority male lawyers and judges in Florida
- List of first minority male lawyers and judges in Georgia
- List of first minority male lawyers and judges in Hawaii
- List of first minority male lawyers and judges in Idaho
- List of first minority male lawyers and judges in Illinois
- List of first minority male lawyers and judges in Indiana
- List of first minority male lawyers and judges in Iowa
- List of first minority male lawyers and judges in Kansas
- List of first minority male lawyers and judges in Kentucky
- List of first minority male lawyers and judges in Louisiana
- List of first minority male lawyers and judges in Maine
- List of first minority male lawyers and judges in Maryland
- List of first minority male lawyers and judges in Massachusetts
- List of first minority male lawyers and judges in Michigan
- List of first minority male lawyers and judges in Minnesota
- List of first minority male lawyers and judges in Mississippi
- List of first minority male lawyers and judges in Missouri
- List of first minority male lawyers and judges in Montana
- List of first minority male lawyers and judges in Nebraska
- List of first minority male lawyers and judges in Nevada
- List of first minority male lawyers and judges in New Hampshire
- List of first minority male lawyers and judges in New Jersey
- List of first minority male lawyers and judges in New Mexico
- List of first minority male lawyers and judges in New York
- List of first minority male lawyers and judges in North Carolina
- List of first minority male lawyers and judges in North Dakota
- List of first minority male lawyers and judges in Ohio
- List of first minority male lawyers and judges in Oklahoma
- List of first minority male lawyers and judges in Oregon
- List of first minority male lawyers and judges in Pennsylvania
- List of first minority male lawyers and judges in Rhode Island
- List of first minority male lawyers and judges in South Carolina
- List of first minority male lawyers and judges in South Dakota
- List of first minority male lawyers and judges in Tennessee
- List of first minority male lawyers and judges in Texas
- List of first minority male lawyers and judges in Utah
- List of first minority male lawyers and judges in Vermont
- List of first minority male lawyers and judges in Virginia
- List of first minority male lawyers and judges in Washington
- List of first minority male lawyers and judges in West Virginia
- List of first minority male lawyers and judges in Wisconsin

=== Wyoming ===
Plasa L. Turner was an African American male lawyer listed in the Wyoming census taken in 1910.

According to White (2024), Theodore “Ted” Jefferson was the first African American male lawyer in Wyoming. Jefferson completed his undergraduate degree at Tennessee State University before matriculating his law studies at the University of Wisconsin in 1953. He was the first African American male to graduate from the University of Wyoming's law school in 1956. He passed the bar exam that same year and was admitted to the State Bar of Wyoming. It is conjectured that Jefferson relocated soon afterwards to Canada, as he faced racial discrimination during his time in Wyoming.

== Firsts in Washington, D.C. ==
- List of first minority male lawyers and judges in Washington D.C.

== Firsts in U.S. territories ==
- List of first minority male lawyers and judges in U.S. territories

== See also ==
- List of African-American jurists
- List of Asian American jurists
- List of Hispanic and Latino American jurists
- List of Jewish American jurists
- List of Native American jurists
- List of LGBT jurists in the United States
- List of first women lawyers and judges in the United States
