= Michael Daly Hawkins =

American judge (born 1945)

Michael Hawkins
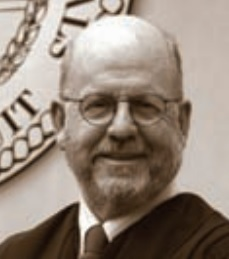
- circa 2011

Senior Judge of the United States Court of Appeals for the Ninth Circuit
- Incumbent
- Assumed office February 12, 2010

Judge of the United States Court of Appeals for the Ninth Circuit
- In office September 15, 1994 – February 12, 2010
- Appointed by: Bill Clinton
- Preceded by: Thomas Tang
- Succeeded by: Mary H. Murguia

Personal details
- Born: Michael Daly Hawkins; February 12, 1945 (age 81) Augusta, Maine, U.S.
- Education: Arizona State University, Tempe (BA, JD); University of Virginia (LLM)

Michael Daly Hawkins (born February 12, 1945) is a Senior United States circuit judge of the United States Court of Appeals for the Ninth Circuit.

== Early life and education ==
Born in Augusta, Maine, Hawkins received his Bachelor of Arts degree and Juris Doctor from Arizona State University and Arizona State University College of Law in 1967 and 1970, respectively, and his Master of Laws from the University of Virginia School of Law in 1998.

== Professional career ==
Hawkins began his career in 1970 as a Special Courts Martial Military Judge in the United States Marine Corps. After leaving the Marine Corps in 1973, he was in private practice until 1976. From 1977 until 1980 he was the United States Attorney for Arizona. From 1980 until 1994 he was a partner in the Phoenix, Arizona law firm of Daughton Hawkins Brockelman Guinan & Patterson. From 1985 through 1989 he was also a Special Prosecutor for the Navajo Nation.

== Federal judicial service ==
Hawkins was nominated by President Bill Clinton on July 13, 1994, to a seat on the United States Court of Appeals for the Ninth Circuit vacated by Judge Thomas Tang. He was confirmed by the United States Senate on September 14, 1994, and received commission on September 15, 1994. He assumed senior status on February 12, 2010.

Legal offices
Preceded by Thomas Tang	Judge of the United States Court of Appeals for the Ninth Circuit; 1994–2010	Succeeded by Mary H. Murguia
