= List of first minority male lawyers and judges in Oklahoma =

This is a list of the first minority male lawyer(s) and judge(s) in Oklahoma. It includes the year in which the men were admitted to practice law (in parentheses). Also included are men who achieved other distinctions, such as becoming the first in their state to graduate from law school or become a political figure.

== Firsts in state history ==
=== Lawyers ===
- First known African American/Creek Freedmen male to practice: Sugar T. George (c. 1870s)
- First African American male (admitted to Oklahoma Territory/Indian Territory): William Henry Twine (1891)
- First Cherokee Indian male: Simon R. Walking-Stick (c. 1893)
- First African American men to form their own law firm: William Henry Twine (1891), G.W.F. Sawner and E.I. Saddler in 1897
- First African American male lawyer from Oklahoma to appear before the U.S. Supreme Court: William Henry Twine (1891) in 1898
- First African American male (admitted to state bar): Buck Colbert (B.C.) Franklin (1908)
- First undocumented male: Javier Hernandez in 2019

=== State judges ===
- First Native American male (judicial officer in Indian Territory): Joe H. Goforth in 1900
- First African American male (judicial officer): Joe Walker (upon his appointment to a Carter County bench in 1950)
- First Native American male (chief justice, Supreme Court of Oklahoma): Napoleon B. Johnson in 1953
- First African American male: Charles L. Owens (1960) in 1968
- First African American male (elected): Amos T. Hall in 1970
- First Hispanic American male: John Michael "Mike" Mancillas (upon his appointment to the Oklahoma Workers Compensation Court of Existing Claims during the 1980s)
- First African American male: David Lewis in 2004 (2004)
- First African American male (Supreme Court of Oklahoma): Tom Colbert (1982) in 2004
- First African American male (presiding judge, Oklahoma Court of Criminal Appeals): David Lewis
- First African American male (chief justice, Supreme Court of Oklahoma): Tom Colbert (1982) in 2013
- First Native American (Chickasaw Nation) male (Supreme Court of Oklahoma): Dustin Rowe in 2019

=== Federal judges ===
- First Native American male (Cherokee Nation) (United States District Court for the Eastern District of Oklahoma): Frank Howell Seay in 1979
- First Native American (Choctaw Nation of Oklahoma) male (U.S. District Court for the Eastern District of Oklahoma, Northern District of Oklahoma, and Western District of Oklahoma): Michael Burrage (1974) beginning 1994
- First African American male (U.S. Court of Appeals for the Tenth Circuit): Jerome Holmes (1988) in 2006
- First African American male (United States District Court for the Western District of Oklahoma): Bernard M. Jones in 2019

=== Assistant attorney general ===
- First African American male: Charles L. Owens (1960) in 1963

=== Political office ===
- First African American male (Oklahoma State Senate): E. Melvin Porter (1960) in 1964

== Firsts in local history ==
- David Lewis: First African American male to serve as a district judge in Comanche County, Oklahoma (1999)
- Steve Pazzo: First Hispanic American male judge in Rogers County, Oklahoma (2010)
- Carlos Chappelle: First African American male to serve as a district court judge (2009), presiding judge elect (2011), and presiding judge (2014) in Tulsa County, Oklahoma

== See also ==
- List of first minority male lawyers and judges in the United States

== Other topics of interest ==
- List of first women lawyers and judges in the United States
- List of first women lawyers and judges in Oklahoma
