= Ethel Maude Proffitt Stephenson =

American lawyer

Ethel Maude Proffitt Stephenson (née Ethel Maude Proffitt) 1895–1982 was an American lawyer who practiced in Okemah and Tulsa specialising in the field of Native American civil rights. She was a senior member of the Oklahoma Bar Association, as well as a member of the Tulsa County Bar Association and the American Bar Association.

== Life ==
Ethel Stephenson was born on 6 March 1895 in Rice, Kansas. Before beginning her legal career Ethel Stephenson was a teacher in Okemah where coincidentally her future husband, Logan Stephenson, had been principal before himself practicing law.

After moving to Tulsa, Ethel Stephenson became a secretary for attorney Logan Stephenson and later studied law under him. Logan Stephenson was President of the State Bar of Oklahoma in 1939 (renamed the Oklahoma Bar Association in 1940)and had a large oil and gas law practice in the Tulsa Atlas Life Building. Ethel married Logan Stephenson after the death of his first wife.

She died in Tulsa on July 6, 1982.

== Legal career ==
Ethel Stephenson was the first female attorney in Okfuskee County, Oklahoma and in 1923 was appointed City Attorney of the Village of Pharoah in Oklahoma, in June of the same year she was admitted to practice before the Supreme Court of Oklahoma.

In December 1928, she became the first female attorney from Oklahoma to be admitted to practice before the Supreme Court of the United States.

From 1924 to 1935, Ethel Stephenson was the attorney of record with Logan Stephenson on 13 cases dealing with a variety of legal issues such as trusts, guardianships, assault and battery, and breach of contract for the sale of land. Logan Stephenson represented John Mabee of the philanthropic J. E. and L. E. Mabee Foundation, formed in 1948. Upon the death of her husband Ethel Stephenson became John Mabee's attorney until the 1960s.

== See also ==
- List of first women lawyers and judges in Oklahoma
