= Shiro Kashiwa =

American judge

Judge of the United States Court of Appeals for the Federal Circuit
- In office October 1, 1982 – January 7, 1986
- Appointed by: operation of law
- Preceded by: Seat established by 96 Stat. 25
- Succeeded by: S. Jay Plager

Judge of the United States Court of Claims
- In office January 3, 1972 – October 1, 1982
- Appointed by: Richard Nixon
- Preceded by: James Randall Durfee
- Succeeded by: Seat abolished

Attorney General of Hawaii
- In office 1959–1963
- Governor: William F. Quinn; John A. Burns
- Preceded by: Jack H. Mizuha
- Succeeded by: George T. H. Pai

Personal details
- Born: Shiro Kashiwa; October 24, 1912 Kohala, Hawaii
- Died: March 13, 1998 (aged 85) Honolulu, Hawaii
- Education: University of Michigan (BS, JD)

Shiro Kashiwa (Japanese: 柏 至朗, October 24, 1912 – March 13, 1998) was an American lawyer and judge who was the first Attorney General of Hawaii to be appointed after it became a state in 1959. He served as a judge of the United States Court of Claims, then as a United States circuit judge of the United States Court of Appeals for the Federal Circuit in Washington, D.C. from 1982 to 1986. He was the first federal judge of Japanese-American descent, the first Asian American judge on the Federal Circuit and was a member of the Jōdo Shinshū sect of Buddhism.

== Education and career ==
Born in Kohala, Hawaii, Kashiwa received a Bachelor of Science degree from University of Michigan in 1935, and was a member of Phi Kappa Phi. He received a Juris Doctor from University of Michigan Law School in 1936. He was in private practice of law in Honolulu, Hawaii from 1937 to 1959. He was the first state attorney general of Hawaii, from 1959 to 1963. He was in private practice of law in Honolulu from 1963 to 1969. He was an assistant United States attorney general of the Land and Natural Resources Division of the United States Department of Justice from 1969 to 1972. There he led the division's first suit against a thermal polluter, oversaw a major case against Armco Steel, and represented the government at the United States Supreme Court.

== Federal judicial service ==
Kashiwa was nominated by President Richard Nixon on November 30, 1971, to a seat on the United States Court of Claims vacated by Judge James Randall Durfee. He was confirmed by the United States Senate on December 2, 1971, and received his commission on January 3, 1972. He was reassigned by operation of law on October 1, 1982, to the United States Court of Appeals for the Federal Circuit, to a new seat authorized by 96 Stat. 25. His service terminated on January 7, 1986, due to his retirement. Kashiwa died on March 13, 1998, in Honolulu.

== See also ==
- List of Asian American jurists
- List of first minority male lawyers and judges in the United States
- List of first minority male lawyers and judges in Hawaii

== Sources ==
- United States Court of Appeals for the Federal Circuit: A History: 1990–2002 / compiled by members of the Advisory Council to the United States Court of Appeals for the Federal Circuit in celebration of the court's twentieth anniversary. Washington, D.C.: U.S. Court of Appeals for the Federal Circuit. 2004. LCCN 2004050209.

Legal offices
| Preceded by Jack H. Mizuha | Attorney General of Hawaii; 1959–1963 | Succeeded by George T. H. Pai |
| Preceded by James Randall Durfee | Judge of the United States Court of Claims; 1972–1982 | Succeeded by Seat abolished |
| Preceded by Seat established by 96 Stat. 25 | Judge of the United States Court of Appeals for the Federal Circuit; 1982–1986 | Succeeded by S. Jay Plager |
