= List of first minority male lawyers and judges in North Dakota =

This is a list of the first minority male lawyer(s) and judge(s) in North Dakota. It includes the year in which the men were admitted to practice law (in parentheses). Also included are those who achieved other distinctions, such becoming the first in their state to graduate from law school or become a political figure.

== Firsts in North Dakota's history ==
=== Lawyers ===
In 1900, the first African American male attorney was listed in the census. However, it is uncertain who that person is.

- Hans C. Walker, Jr. (1960): One of the first Native American (Hidatsa) male lawyers in North Dakota

=== Judge ===
- First blind male: Lester Ketterling c. 1986

=== Federal judges ===
- First Jewish American male (Court of Appeals for the Eighth Circuit): Myron H. Bright (1947) in 1968

== See also ==
- List of first minority male lawyers and judges in the United States

== Other topics of interest ==
- List of first women lawyers and judges in the United States
- List of first women lawyers and judges in North Dakota
