= Murai (surname) =

Murai (written: 村井 lit. "village well") is a Japanese surname. Notable people with the surname include:

- Daijiro Murai (村井 大次郎, born 1962), Japanese rugby union player
- Ernest Isao Murai (1900–1981), Japanese American political official
- Hideki Murai (born 1980), Japanese politician
- Hideo Murai (1958–1995), member of the Aum Shinrikyo cult
- Jin Murai (born 1937), Governor of Nagano Prefecture
- Jun Murai (born 1955), Japanese computer scientist
- Kazusa Murai (born 1975), Japanese voice actress
- Katsuyuki Murai (born 1969), Japanese actor
- Keisuke Murai (村井 啓介, born 1973), Japanese rower
- Kenjirō Murai, member of Cali Gari
- Kunio Murai (born 1944), Japanese actor and voice actor
- Muneaki Murai (born 1973), Japanese politician
- Murai Sadakatsu (1528–1582), Japanese samurai
- Murai Shimako (born 1928), Japanese playwright
- Shinji Murai (born 1979), Japanese football player
- Taiki Murai (born 1993), Japanese footballer
- Tomio Murai (村井 富雄, born 1948), Japanese rower
- Yoshihiro Murai (born 1960), Governor of Miyagi Prefecture

== See also ==
- Imura
