= Peter Aduja =

American politician

Territorial House of Representatives member
- In office 1954–1956

District Court Judge
- In office 1960–1962

State House of Representatives member, 23rd District
- In office 1966–1974

Personal details
- Born: Peter Aquino Aduja; 19 October 1920 Salindeg, Vigan, Ilocos Sur, Luzon, Philippine Islands
- Died: 19 February 2007 (aged 86) Las Vegas, Nevada, United States
- Resting place: Hawaii State Veterans Cemetery
- Party: Republican
- Occupation: Soldier, teacher, judge, politician

Military service
- Allegiance: United States
- Branch/service: United States Army
- Years of service: 1944–1946
- Rank: 1st Lieutenant
- Unit: 1st Filipino Infantry Regiment
- Battles/wars: World War II

Peter Aquino Aduja (19 October 1920 – 19 February 2007) was the first Filipino American elected to public office in the United States. He was elected as a representative in the Hawaii Legislature in 1954.

Born in the Philippines, Aduja emigrated to Hawaii in his youth, and then served in the United States Army during World War II. After World War II, he worked as a teacher, before becoming one of the first Filipino lawyers in Hawaii. After two years in elected office, he worked for the Hawaiian Department of Attorney General, and served two years as a judge, until being elected to the Hawaii House of Representatives. Aduja died in Las Vegas in 2007.

== Early life ==
Aduja was born in Ilocos Sur in the Philippines and emigrated with his family at the age of eight to Hilo, Hawaii. He was raised in nearby Hakalau, Hawaii, while his father worked on a sugarcane plantation as a sakada. He attended Hilo High, where he was the student body president and an Eagle Scout, graduating with the class of 1941 as salutatorian. After high school, he went on to the University of Hawaii to major in government and history; while attending university Aduja worked as a timekeeper at Pearl Harbor. In 1944, he joined the United States Army, and along with 50 other individuals volunteered for the 1st Filipino Infantry Regiment.

Following World War II he married Melodie "Lesing" Cabalona (died 2002). He taught on the island of Hawaii, at Naalehu Intermediate School, before attending Boston University, where he earned a law degree in 1951. In 1953, along with Ben Menor (later a justice on Hawaii's Supreme Court), Aduja took the bar examination, and both became Hawaii's first Filipino lawyers.

== Political career ==
In 1954, Aduja was elected to the Territorial House of Representatives, becoming the first Filipino to be elected to public office in Hawaii and the United States. He represented one of three seats of the island of Hawaii. In 1956, he spoke on behalf of the Republican Party at the ILWU territorial convention in Hilo. After a single term in office, he went on to work for the Department of Attorney General. In 1959, he ran for State Senate from Oahu, a year when fellow Republican William F. Quinn was elected as the state's first governor, and lost. From 1960 to 1962, he was a district court judge, resigning from the bench in June 1962. After two years out of the public sector, in 1966, he was elected again to public office, this time as a member of the Hawaii House of Representatives. His district included Kailua, the North Shore, and Kahuku. While a member of the Hawaii House of Representatives, he was a delegate at the Hawaii State Constitution's 1968 constitutional convention. Aduja departed the Hawaii House of Representatives in 1974, and returned to the public sector in his final position as a member of the City of Honolulu's Kaneohe Neighborhood Board, which he was on from 1986 until 1994.

== Later years ==
In 1991, Professor Dan Boylan wrote that Aduja was one of three important Filipino politicians in Hawaii during the beginning era of Filipino politics in Hawaii. Along with Alfred Laureta and Ben Menor, and a few other minor individuals, they were the few Filipinos in elected office or in significant public office in Hawaii in the mid-20th century. On 19 February 2007, he died while on vacation in Las Vegas. Governor Linda Lingle declared 29 March 2007 to be Peter A. Aduja Day. Aduja was survived by two children (one of whom is former Hawaii state senator Melodie Aduja) and two grandchildren.

== See also ==
- List of Asian American jurists
- List of first minority male lawyers and judges in Hawaii
