= Sharon Prost =

American judge (born 1951)

- Prost in 2012

Chief Judge of the United States Court of Appeals for the Federal Circuit
- In office May 30, 2014 – May 21, 2021
- Preceded by: Randall Ray Rader
- Succeeded by: Kimberly A. Moore

Judge of the United States Court of Appeals for the Federal Circuit
- Incumbent
- Assumed office September 24, 2001
- Appointed by: George W. Bush
- Preceded by: S. Jay Plager

Personal details
- Born: May 24, 1951 (age 75) Newburyport, Massachusetts, U.S.
- Education: Cornell University (BS); George Washington University (MBA, LLM); American University (JD)

Sharon Prost (born May 24, 1951) is a United States circuit judge of the United States Court of Appeals for the Federal Circuit.

== Education ==
Prost was born in Newburyport, Massachusetts. She received a Bachelor of Science degree from Cornell University in 1973, a Master of Business Administration from George Washington University in 1975, a Juris Doctor from American University Washington College of Law in 1979, and a Master of Laws from George Washington University Law School in 1984.

== Career ==
Prior to her confirmation to the Federal Circuit, Prost had served as a lawyer at the Senate Judiciary Committee from 1993 to 2001, lastly as chief counsel. Although the Republicans were in the minority at the time of Prost's nomination, her eight years of service for the committee would have ensured that she was well known by all committee members. Before working for the Senate, she served as an attorney at the Federal Labor Relations Authority from 1980 to 1983, the United States Department of the Treasury from 1983 to 1984 and the National Labor Relations Board from 1984 to 1989. Before that she was an auditor and labor relations specialist for the Government Accountability Office from 1976 to 1980 and a labor relations specialist for the United States Civil Service Commission from 1973 to 1976. She also served as Chief Labor Counsel for the minority at the United States Senate Committee on Labor and Human Resources from 1989 to 1993.

=== Federal judicial service ===
Prost was nominated to the United States Court of Appeals for the Federal Circuit by President George W. Bush on May 21, 2001, to fill a seat vacated by Judge S. Jay Plager. The United States Senate confirmed Prost's confirmation on September 21, 2001, by a 97–0 vote. She received her commission on September 24, 2001. On May 23, 2014, Prost was named chief judge of the Federal Circuit, succeeding Chief Judge Randall Rader effective May 30, 2014. Her term as chief judge ended on May 22, 2021.

== See also ==
- List of Jewish American jurists

== Sources ==
- DOES FATHER KNOW BEST?, Time Magazine, March 20, 1995
- Confirmation hearings on federal appointments : hearings before the Committee on the Judiciary, United States Senate, One Hundred Seventh Congress, first session. 4.J 89/2:S.HRG.107-584/ pt.1

Legal offices
Preceded by S. Jay Plager	Judge of the United States Court of Appeals for the Federal Circuit; 2001–present	Incumbent
Preceded by Randall Ray Rader	Chief Judge of the United States Court of Appeals for the Federal Circuit; 2014–2021	Succeeded by Kimberly A. Moore
