= Mary Stella Cota-Robles =

Arizona's first Hispanic American female lawyer (1915–1989)

Mary Stella Rosenberg Cota-Robles (1915–1989) was Arizona’s first Hispanic American female lawyer.

She was born in Tubac, Arizona in 1915. In 1940, Cota-Robles became the first Hispanic female admitted to practice law in Arizona. Cota-Robles worked as a Deputy County Attorney during the 1950s and a defense attorney during the 1960s. She was married to Mario Cota-Robles, Esq. and they eventually opened a law office in Tucson, Arizona. She died in 1989 in Tucson, Arizona.

== See also ==
- List of first women lawyers and judges in Arizona
