= S. Jay Plager =

American judge (born 1931)

Jay Plager
- Plager in 2012

Senior Judge of the United States Court of Appeals for the Federal Circuit
- Incumbent
- Assumed office November 30, 2000

Judge of the United States Court of Appeals for the Federal Circuit
- In office November 11, 1989 – November 30, 2000
- Appointed by: George H. W. Bush
- Preceded by: Shiro Kashiwa
- Succeeded by: Sharon Prost

Personal details
- Born: Sheldon Jay Plager; May 16, 1931 (age 95) Long Branch, New Jersey, U.S.
- Spouse: Frankie Plager (m. 1951; div. 1980)
- Children: 3
- Education: University of North Carolina, Chapel Hill (BA); University of Florida (JD); Columbia University (LLM)

Sheldon Jay Plager (born May 16, 1931) is an American judge who is a Senior United States circuit judge of the United States Court of Appeals for the Federal Circuit.

== Early life and education ==
Born in Long Branch, New Jersey to A.L. and Clara Plager, Plager was educated in the public schools. He received his B.A. degree from the University of North Carolina in 1952, and his Juris Doctor from the University of Florida College of Law in 1958, with high honors, followed by a Master of Laws from Columbia Law School in 1961. He was in the United States Navy from 1948 to 1970, being commissioned as an ensign in 1952 and serving in active duty following World War II, earning the rank of Commander before he retired.

== Career ==
Plager taught as a law professor at the University of Florida from 1958 to 1963, then at the University of Illinois College of Law until 1977, and was then a dean and professor at the Indiana University Maurer School of Law until 1984. He also taught as a visiting professor at the University of Wisconsin Law School, was a visiting scholar at Stanford Law School, and was a visiting fellow at Cambridge University and the Rockefeller Foundation Research Center. From 1986 to 1987, he was counselor to the undersecretary of the United States Department of Health and Human Services, followed by three years as associate director and later administrator of the Office of Information and Regulatory Affairs in the Office of Management and Budget.

== Federal judicial service ==
Plager was nominated by President George H. W. Bush on September 12, 1989, to a seat on the United States Court of Appeals for the Federal Circuit vacated by Shiro Kashiwa, and he was confirmed by the United States Senate on November 8, 1989. He received his commission on November 11, 1989. Plager assumed senior status on November 30, 2000, and continues to sit as a Senior United States Circuit Judge. In addition to his teaching and judicial activities, he has authored numerous articles and books.

== Personal ==
Plager married his college sweetheart Frankie Lee (née Bird) Plager in 1951 while still in college. They divorced in 1980. They had three children, and six grandchildren (two from each children) by the time of his ex-wife's death in February 2015.

== See also ==
- G. L. Christian and Associates v. United States

Legal offices
Preceded by Shiro Kashiwa	Judge of the United States Court of Appeals for the Federal Circuit; 1989–2000	Succeeded by Sharon Prost
