= Helen Hamilton =

American lawyer

Helen N. Hamilton (January 3, 1874 – September 30, 1949) was North Dakota's first female lawyer.

Hamilton was born on January 3, 1874. She graduated from the University of North Dakota School of Law in 1905. Hamilton was the only female student in the senior class and became the class president. She was admitted as the state's first female lawyer the same year and proceeded to set up a law practice in Grand Forks, North Dakota.

In 1915, Hamilton was one of the first women to apply for admission to the American Bar Association. During the association's national convention that year in Salt Lake City, the ABA's General Council debated the application in what one newspaper described as "one of the stormiest sessions in the history of the association."

While the ABA ultimately rejected Hamilton's application, it seems likely that Hamilton's effort helped pave the way for the ABA's decision in 1918 to admit its first two women, Mary Florence Lathrop of Denver and Mary Grossman of Cleveland.

Hamilton died in Grand Forks on September 30, 1949. In 1999, the University of North Dakota School of Law designated a "Helen Hamilton Day" in her honor.

== See also ==
- List of first women lawyers and judges in North Dakota
