= Sarah D. Grant =

American judge (1942–2016)

Sarah Dickinson Grant (November 10, 1942 – May 3, 2016) was an American judge.

Born in El Dorado, Kansas, Grant lived in Austin, Texas and graduated from McCallum High School. She received her bachelor's degree from University of California, Los Angeles. in 1966, and was a medical case worker at Harbor General Hospital in Los Angeles, California. In 1970, Grant received her law degree from Arizona State University School of Law and was one of the first women in the first graduating class of the law school. Grant practiced law in Phoenix, Arizona. From 1979 to 1982, Grant served as judge of the Maricopa County, Arizona Superior Court. In 1982, Grant was appointed judge of the Arizona Court of Appeals, Division One, replacing Sandra Day O'Connor and served until her retirement in 1999. Grant died at her home in Phoenix, Arizona.

== See also ==
- List of first women lawyers and judges in Arizona
