= Martha Blue =

American lawyer and author

Martha Blue (born c. 1942) is an American lawyer and author. She is a partner in the Arizona law firm of Wade and Blue.

== Legal career ==
Blue was admitted to the bar in Arizona in 1967. She entered private practice in 1974, specializing in publishing, art, copyright, human rights, and Native American law. As a young lawyer and mother, she would bring her daughter to work with her every day and nurse her in the office.

In 1967, Blue was one of the first attorneys to work at Dinébe’iiná Náhiiłna be Agha’diit’ahii (DNA), a legal aid program serving Navajo and Hopi people. She took the job at DNA partly because it was difficult for her to find a position as a female attorney. She was one of three women in her graduating class, and all were only offered jobs as law clerks. During her time at the agency, she handled more than 6,000 cases and trained native peoples to serve as legal advocates in tribal courts.

For seven years, Blue lived in Tuba City, Arizona, on Navajo lands. She works frequently with Hualapai, Navajo, and Hopi peoples. Ward and Blue is based in Flagstaff, Arizona but has a branch office in Tuba City. Blue also served as counsel to the Tuba City School Board. She was the general counsel for the Havasupai tribe and helped the tribal counsel draft of the tribal law code. The only way to reach the tribe, who lives at the bottom of the Grand Canyon, is to travel by foot, horseback, or helicopter.

Blue lived for a time in Micronesia but found it difficult to be taken seriously as a woman. While there, she helped to establish a legal services program for Micronesian residents of the Trust Territory of the Pacific Islands in 1971.

Blue has taught at various levels, including courses at Northern Arizona University on Navajo ethnology. She is frequently consultant on issues relating to Native American welfare. She was recognized in 2000 by the Maricopa County Bar Association as one of 100 minority lawyers who had made a difference in Arizona. Blue has served as chairman of the Arizona State Bar Association's Art Law Committee.

== Personal life ==
Blue was born in Cincinnati, Ohio to David and Martha Manning. As a child her family moved to Cleveland. When she was 11, they moved west, first to Colorado and then Arizona. The family arrived in Phoenix, and then settled in Prescott where she was graduated from high school. As a child she wanted to be an African missionary when she grew up, and then a doctor, before settling on the law in high school. Blue attended the University of Arizona for both her bachelor's degree and then for law school, completing the traditionally seven-year program in six. Blue earned a Juris Doctor in 1966.

Blue founded and served as president of the Friends of the Hubbell Trading Post National Historic Site. She was also a trustee of the Museum of Northern Arizona and served on the board of Native Americans for Community Action.

Blue has a sister, Marlene McGoffin, and a brother, Quentin Craft. Blue was formerly married to Roy Ward, her law partner. Together they have a daughter, Zoe. She lives in Flagstaff, Arizona.

== Publications ==
Her writing focuses on the historical juxtoposition of the various cultures of the American Southwest.

- By the Book, Legal ABCs for the Printed Word
- Your Right to Indian Welfare
- Handbook on BIA General Assistance for Attorneys and Advocates
- Making It Legal: A Legal Guide for the Author, Artists, and Craftsperson
- Indian Trader, an ethnobiography of Juan Lorenzo Hubbell

== See also ==
- List of first women lawyers and judges in Arizona
