= Cynthia Eloise Cleveland =

American lawyer, politician, writer, and temperance worker (1845–1932)

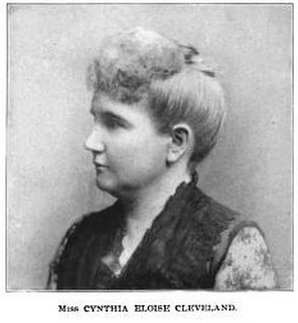
- Cynthia Eloise Cleveland, from an 1896 publication
- Born: Cynthia Eloise Cleveland; August 13, 1845; Canton, New York, U.S.
- Died: April 30, 1932 (aged 86); Kensington, Maryland, U.S.
- Education: Howard University
- Occupations: Lawyer, politician, writer, temperance worker
- Years active: 1883–1932
- Known for: First woman lawyer admitted to the bar in the Dakota Territory
- Notable work: See-Saw: or Civil Service in the Departments (1887) His Honor; or Fate's Mysteries: A Thrilling Realistic Story of the United States Army (1889)
- Parent: Erin Cleveland Laura Marsh Cleveland
- Relatives: Distant relative of President Grover Cleveland

Cynthia Eloise Cleveland (August 13, 1845 – April 1932) was an American lawyer, politician, writer, and temperance worker. She was the first woman lawyer admitted to the bar in the Dakota Territory.

== Early life ==
Cynthia Eloise Cleveland was born in Canton, New York, the daughter of Erin Cleveland and Laura Marsh Cleveland. She earned law degrees from Howard University in 1899 and 1900. She was described as a cousin or relative of President Grover Cleveland, though she admitted that the connection was distant and they did not know each other.

== Career ==
In 1883 Cleveland was based in Pierre, South Dakota when she became the first woman to practice law in the Dakota Territory. She lectured across the region as president of the Women's Christian Temperance Union in the Dakotas, and worked for prohibition to be written into the constitutions of North Dakota and South Dakota at statehood. She also raised funds for a Presbyterian university to be built in South Dakota. Having passed the civil service examination in 1885, she worked for the U. S. Treasury Department from 1886 until 1911, as a post office inspector, and lived in Washington, D.C. after 1888.

Cleveland wrote two novels set in Washington D. C., See-Saw: or Civil Service in the Departments (1887) and His Honor; or Fate's Mysteries: A Thrilling Realistic Story of the United States Army (1889). See-Saw was considered barely fictional, based as it was so closely on her own experiences with the civil service. "Miss Cynthia E. Cleveland's life is identical with that of her heroine," observed the Chicago Tribune, "except her description of herself, which is entirely different."

She was a member of the Association of American Authors, the Woman's Relief Corps, and the Woman's National Press Association. She spoke against women's suffrage, explaining that "Women in public business know how hard it is to struggle against being considered unfeminine. The ballot would make Amazons of women."

== Personal life ==
After she retired from government work, Cleveland ran a tourist hotel in the Chesapeake Bay. She died in 1932, aged 87 years, at home in Kensington, Maryland.

== See also ==
- List of first women lawyers and judges in South Dakota
