= Pearl Tang =

Medical doctor (1922–2021)

Pearl Mao Tang
- Born: Pearl Mao; January 11, 1922; Shanghai
- Died: June 11, 2021 (aged 99)
- Education: University of Aurora; University of Arizona
- Known for: Work in the field of public health
- Spouse: Thomas Tang

Pearl Mao Tang (January 11, 1922 – June 11, 2021) was a Chinese-American obstetrician and gynecologist credited with decreasing infant mortality in Arizona.

== Early life ==
Pearl Mao was born on January 11, 1922, in Shanghai. She was the fourth child of five born to Mabel Wong and David Mao, a doctor and teacher. Mao had been born in Hawaii and attended medical school in Kansas before meeting and marrying Wong while teaching in China.

Mao attended private British schools from grade through high school, graduating high school in 1938. She began her undergraduate degree at the University of Aurora in Shanghai. While she began studying mechanical engineering, she switched to medicine, graduating with a medical degree in 1945. Mao moved to Quebec City after graduating to complete her residency in obstetrics and gynecology at Hôpital du St-Sacrement.

In 1945, Mao met Thomas Tang at a Thanksgiving dinner a church in China organized for American soldiers. They corresponded through letters while Mao was in residency and he was completing his undergraduate degree. In 1947, Mao completed her residency, converted to Catholicism, and married Thomas Tang. They later moved to Phoenix, Arizona.

== Career ==
In Phoenix, Tang experienced discrimination, making it difficult for her to practice as a physician. When Tang tried to apply for a medical license to practice in Arizona, she was denied due to her foreign status. She was also unable to attend medical school again, as she had a medical degree already.

In 1948, the Tangs moved to Tucson, Arizona. They both attended the University of Arizona– Mao studied for her master's degree while Thomas studied law. They both graduated in 1950, and returned to Phoenix where Tang joined the U.S. Public Health Service Communicable Disease Center in Phoenix doing microbiology work studying diarrheal diseases. In her work, she identified the pathogenic E. Coli, which had national significance.

Thomas used his new law degree to appeal to the State Board of Medical Examiners for Mao to take the licensing exam. In 1951, Mao passed, making her the first Asian woman to become a licensed physician. She began her medical career in charge of the hospital on the San Carlos Apache Indian Reservation.

In, 1954, Tang began working part-time in a program immunizing Maricopa County school children against diphtheria with the Maricopa County Public Health Department. She went on to work in pediatric clinics. In both positions, she saw large socio-economic discrepancies and the impact on health. Inspired by her work with child health, she was inspired to work in prenatal care and maternity clinics in an effort to prevent preterm birth. Tang started pop-up prenatal clinics in metro Phoenix in areas that did not have adequate access to medical care. She and her nurses learned Spanish to communicate with patients. Tang set up mobile clinics, often staffing them herself. By 1970, Arizona's infant mortality rate had dropped by two-thirds to a level that was lower than the national average.

In 1960, Tang became the chief of the Maricopa County Bureau of Maternal and Child Health, allowing her to expand her efforts. In 1962, she created the Cervical Cancer project. which provided pap smears in an effort to detect cervical cancer earlier. Tang also created a program called Head Start, which won the National Association of Counties Award for its work with services for children.

In the late 1960s, Tang organized a Maternity Care bus, which provided obstetric care and family planning services.

Tang championed legislation, sponsored by Sandra Day O'Connor requiring schoolchildren to be vaccinated.

Tang retired in 1982. Her husband died in 1995.

Tang died on June 11, 2021.

== Personal life ==
Tang and her husband adopted two children from China. They adopted a girl in 1957 and a boy in 1958.

== Awards ==
- 2022: Arizona Women's Hall of Fame
- 2021: Arizona Public Health Association Elsie Eyer Commitment to Underserved People Award
- 2020: USA Today, Women of the Century, Arizona
- 2015: Diana Gregory Outreach Services Foundation Lifetime Achievement Award
- 2012: Arizona Public Health Association Senator Andy Nichols Honor Award
- 2007: Arizona State University Servant Leadership Award
- 2006: State Bar of Arizona Award of Appreciation
