= Licensed federal attorney =

Type of US attorney licensure

In the United States, a federal attorney or federal court attorney is an attorney who has been admitted to practice before a Federal court for a particular jurisdiction.

== Eligibility ==
In most jurisdictions eligibility is limited to those already admitted to a state bar association; some jurisdictions require prior admission to another federal court or appellate court. Some jurisdictions may require a certain level of experience for eligibility.

== Admission requirements ==
Most jurisdictions require the submission of an application for admission. Some jurisdictions require attendance at a federal court practice seminar prior to admission. Some jurisdictions require passing an examination, obtaining sponsorships, or other documentation. Once approved for admission, applicants must be sworn in, sometimes individually but often at a mass-swearing in ceremony.

Admission to practice in federal court is not of itself evidence of experience in federal court. Due to the complexity of many federal court cases and the legal and procedural differences from state court cases, it is sensible for a person involved in federal litigation or a federal criminal defendant to seek a lawyer with considerable federal court experience.

== See also ==
- Federal Bar Association
- List of US federal courts
