= Masayo Imura =

Japanese synchronized swimmer

Masayo Imura (井村 雅代; born August 16, 1950, in Osaka, Japan) is a Japanese synchronized swimming instructor known as the "mother of synchro". She is currently the head coach of the Japanese National Synchronised Swimming Team.

== Career ==
In 1963, she became synchronized swimmer and retired in 1973. In the 1974 she became a coach and coached the Japan's National Synchronised Swimming Team from 1978 to 2004.

In 1968 and 1973 she was a member of Japan's national synchronised swimming champion team.

From 1984 to 2004 she was Head Coach of Japan's Synchronised Swimming Team for six Olympic Games in a row. Her team won silvers at the 2000 and 2004 Olympic Games.

In 2007, she became the head coach of China's synchronized team.
