= James Edward Lykins =

American sculptor

James Edward Lykins is a sculptor from South Charleston, West Virginia. His father was H. F. Lykins, an organic research chemist for Union Carbide, and his mother was a registered nurse named M. E. Lykins. He was interested in art from a young age, but did not like the publicity. After entering an art competition, he was offered a four-year arts scholarship to a university in Hawaii, but was too young to accept it at age 14. Three years later he joined the United States Marine Corps. He won a Purple Heart for his actions in the Vietnamese Demilitarized Zone and in Laos during the Vietnam War. He suffers posttraumatic stress disorder from his experiences, and his wife Robin Lykins inspired him to take up art as a hobby again as therapy. One of his better known pieces, Green Faces/Purple Hearts, has won the first prize at the National Veterans Creative Arts Festival. He has also sculpted memorials to Chuck Yeager, Carter G. Woodson, and a memorial to the Fallen Firefighters of West Virginia.
