= Laura Lykins =

American lawyer

Laura Lykins (born 1869/70) was Oklahoma's first female lawyer. She was born on the Shawnee Indian Reservation in Kansas. Her mother was Caucasian whereas her father was the brother of the Shawnee chief Blue Jacket. Lykins graduated from the law department of the Carlisle Indian School in 1898 before relocating to Oklahoma City, Oklahoma. Later that same year, Lykins became the first female admitted to the Oklahoma State Bar.

== See also ==
- List of first women lawyers and judges in Oklahoma
