= Federal Bar Association =

Voluntary professional organization

- Formation: January 5, 1920
- Headquarters: Arlington, Virginia
- Location: United States
- President: Glen R. McMurry
- Website: www.fedbar.org

The Federal Bar Association (FBA) is the primary voluntary professional organization for private and government lawyers and judges practicing and sitting in federal courts in the United States. Four times a year, the FBA prints The Federal Lawyer, which includes the latest news of interest to the federal legal community. The magazine features articles by attorneys and judges, book reviews, the latest Supreme Court rulings, judicial profiles, and thorough coverage of FBA activities.

== Background ==
The Federal Bar Association is an income tax exempt (501-C6) organization, founded in 1920. The purpose of the FBA is:

- To serve as the national representative of the Federal legal profession;
- To promote the sound administration of justice;
- To enhance the professional growth and development of members of the Federal legal profession;
- To promote high standards of professional competence and ethical conduct in the Federal legal profession;
- To promote the welfare of attorneys and judges employed by the Government of the United States;
- To provide meaningful service for the welfare and benefit of the members of the Association;
- To provide quality education programs to the Federal legal profession and the public;
- To keep members informed of developments in their respective fields of interest;
- To keep members informed of the Association's affairs, to encourage their involvement in its activities, and to provide members opportunities to assume leadership roles;
- To promote professional and social interaction among members of the Federal legal profession

== Foundation of the Federal Bar Association ==
The Foundation of the Federal Bar Association holds a congressional charter under Title 36 of the United States Code as a (501-C3) organization in 1954.

The Foundation’s mission is to:

- Promote and support legal research and education;
- Advance the science of jurisprudence;
- Facilitate the administration of justice; and
- Foster improvements in the practice of Federal law.

Contributions to the Foundation of the Federal Bar Association and its restricted funds may be treated as charitable contributions for tax purposes.

== Chapters ==
The Federal Bar Association has nearly 100 local chapters across the country and in Puerto Rico and the U.S. Virgin Islands. Local chapters provide benefits, including:

- Networking opportunities with federal judiciary and other practitioners
- More than 700 hours of CLE credit
- Focus on legislative issues at the local, state, and national level
- Leadership opportunities on both the local and national level
- Membership communications such as newsletters and e-communications

== Sections ==
The FBA has 24 substantive law sections. In addition to networking opportunities, many sections distribute quarterly newsletters providing current information on their particular area of the law.

- Admiralty Law Section
- Alternative Dispute Resolution Section
- Antitrust & Trade Regulation Section
- Banking Law Section
- Bankruptcy Law Section
- Civil Rights Law Section
- Criminal Law Section
- Environment, Energy & Natural Resources Section
- Federal Litigation Section
- Government Contracts Section
- Health Law Section
- Immigration Law Section
- Indian Law Section
- Intellectual Property Section
- International Law Section
- Labor & Employment Law Section
- LGBT Law Section
- Qui Tam Section
- Section on Taxation
- Securities Law Section
- Social Security Law Section
- State & Local Government Relations Section
- Transportation & Transportation Security Law Section
- Veterans & Military Law Section

== Divisions ==
The FBA has 6 career divisions:

- Corporate and Association Counsel Division
- Federal Career Service Division
- Judiciary Division
- Law Student Division
- Senior Lawyers Division
- Younger Lawyers Division
