= Juggie Heen =

American politician

Ernest Nalani Heen, Jr. (August 31, 1930 – June 30, 2013), known as Juggie Heen, was an American politician.

One of nine children of former city clerk and territorial senator Ernest Nalani Heen Sr., Heen served in the United States Air Force. He then worked in real estate development and sales. He served in the Hawaii House of Representatives 1963-1967 and 1969-1971 as a Democrat. In later years, he was an organizer and mentor for the state Democratic Party.

Heen died of pancreatic and liver cancer on June 30, 2013, aged 82, at Tripler Army Medical Center for Aging.
