= Bryant Y Yang =

American state court judge (born 1981/1982)

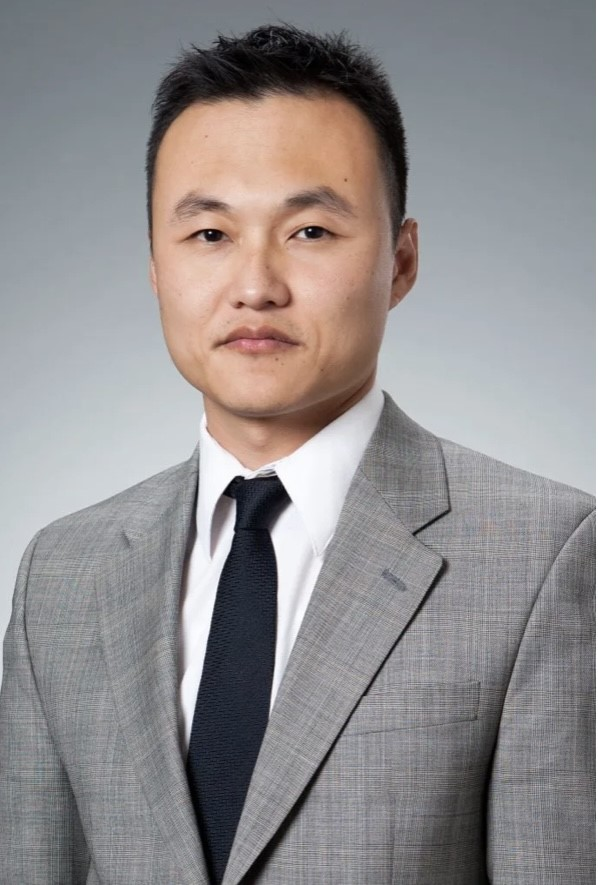

Judge of the Los Angeles County Superior Court
- Incumbent
- Assumed office November 13, 2020
- Appointed by: Gavin Newsom
- Preceded by: Yvonne T. Sanchez

Personal details
- Born: 1981 or 1982 (age 43–44) Burma
- Party: Democratic
- Education: University of California, Berkeley BA, JD

Bryant Y Yang (born 1981/1982) is an American state court judge who serves as a judge of the Los Angeles County Superior Court.

== Early life ==
Yang was born in Burma and immigrated with his parents to the United States in 1987. He grew up in a working class household, where his father worked as a stock person and his mother worked as a cashier at the National Dollar Stores. His father died when he was a teenager.

== Education ==
Yang graduated with High Honor earning a Bachelor of Arts in 2004 and Juris Doctor in 2007 from the University of California, Berkeley.

== Career ==
Yang worked as an associate at Morrison & Foerster LLP from 2007 to 2010. In 2010, Yang served as Special Prosecutor at the Burbank City Attorney's Office and as Special Counsel at the Glendale City Attorney's Office. In 2012, Yang was the deputy director for Voter Protection for Nevada for Organizing for America. Yang was an Associate at Irell & Manella LLP from 2012 to 2016. He has been a Lecturer and adjunct professor at Harvey Mudd College in 2009, 2015 and 2020. Yang was an Assistant United States Attorney for the United States Department of Justice from 2016 - 2020.

Yang was the President & Program Director of the Asian Pacific American Advocates - Greater Los Angeles Chapter (2008 - 2011), President, Vice President and Treasurer of the Asian Pacific American Bar Association of Los Angeles County (2007 - 2016), Chair and Vice-Chair of California State Bar / California Lawyers Association (2012 - 2018), Vice Chair of the Los Angeles County Bar Association State Appellate Judicial Evaluation Committee since 2013 and Chair of the American Bar Association Standing Committee on Legal Aid and Indigent Defense since 2016.

Governor Gavin Newsom appointed Yang to the Los Angeles Superior Court on November 13, 2020, to replace Yvonne T. Sanchez. He is the vice-chair of the Criminal Justice Section of the Los Angeles County Bar Association. Yang is the first Burmese American judge in the United States.

Yang was the president of the Asian Pacific American Bar Association (APABA) in 2016. He also spent time working with Burmese refugees at the Myanmar-Thailand border.
