= Thomas Tang =

American judge (1922–1995)

Senior Judge of the United States Court of Appeals for the Ninth Circuit
- In office October 12, 1993 – July 18, 1995

Judge of the United States Court of Appeals for the Ninth Circuit
- In office October 12, 1977 – October 12, 1993
- Appointed by: Jimmy Carter
- Preceded by: Richard Harvey Chambers
- Succeeded by: Michael Daly Hawkins

Personal details
- Born: January 11, 1922 Phoenix, Arizona, U.S.
- Died: July 18, 1995 (aged 73) Phoenix, Arizona, U.S.
- Spouse: Pearl Mao Tang
- Children: 1
- Education: Santa Clara University (BS); University of Arizona (LLB)

Chinese name
- Traditional Chinese: 鄧心平
- Simplified Chinese: 邓心平
Transcriptions
Standard Mandarin
- Hanyu Pinyin: Dèng Xīnpíng
Yue: Cantonese
- Yale Romanization: Dahng Sām-pìhng
- Jyutping: Dang^{6} Sam^{4}-ping^{4}

Thomas Tang (January 11, 1922 – July 18, 1995) was an American lawyer and jurist who served as a United States circuit judge of the United States Court of Appeals for the Ninth Circuit from 1977 to 1995. Tang was the first American of Chinese descent to become a U.S. federal judge.

== Education and career ==
The son of a grocery owner, Tang was born and spent his early years in Phoenix, Arizona, where he attended public schools. He joined the military through ROTC in 1942 and became a First Lieutenant in the United States Army. After graduation from the Santa Clara University with a Bachelor of Science degree and the James E. Rogers College of Law at the University of Arizona with a Bachelor of Laws, he was again commissioned to the Army and served on the Korean Peninsula during the Korean War. In 1952, Tang resigned from the Army and after a brief stint of private practice, served as Deputy County Attorney of Maricopa County, Arizona from 1952 to 1957 and Assistant Attorney General of Arizona from 1957 to 1959. He was then elected to the Phoenix City Council in 1960, and a Judge of the Superior Court of Arizona in 1963. During his tenure as Superior Court Judge, numerous lawyers who later rose to great eminence appeared before him, former United States Supreme Court Justice Sandra Day O'Connor being one of them. After losing his judicial re-election in 1970, due to a highly publicized juvenile murder trial in which he was accused for being too lenient, Tang returned to private practice.

== Federal judicial service ==
Tang was nominated by President Jimmy Carter on August 29, 1977, to a seat on the United States Court of Appeals for the Ninth Circuit vacated by Judge Richard Harvey Chambers. He was confirmed by the United States Senate on October 7, 1977, and received his commission on October 12, 1977. He assumed senior status on October 12, 1993. His service was terminated on July 18, 1995, due to his death of cancer at the Good Samaritan Hospital in Phoenix.

== Competition in his honor ==
In 1993, the APA Law Student Association of the South Texas College of Law in Houston, Texas named a national moot court competition in Tang's honor. The Thomas Tang Moot Court Competition is now administered by the National Asian Pacific American Bar Association (NAPABA) Law Foundation and the NAPABA Judicial Council. The Competition continues to honor the late Judge Tang, a champion of individual rights, an advocate for the advancement of minority attorneys, an ardent supporter of NAPABA and the moot court competition. Judge Tang’s wife, Dr. Pearl Tang, continued the legacy during her lifetime. The competition is open to all students but is especially designed to reach out to APA law students and provide them with an opportunity to showcase their writing and oral skills and compete for scholarships.

== See also ==
- List of Asian American jurists
- List of first minority male lawyers and judges in the United States

== Additional sources ==
Legal offices
Preceded by Richard Harvey Chambers	Judge of the United States Court of Appeals for the Ninth Circuit; 1977–1993	Succeeded by Michael Daly Hawkins
