= Patricia MacGuigan =

Judge of the Oklahoma Court of Civil Appeals
- In office 1982–1991
- Appointed by: George Nigh

Personal details
- Born: September 8, 1939 Beaver, Pennsylvania, U. S.
- Died: December 26, 2024 (aged 85) Oklahoma City, Oklahoma, U.S.
- Education: University of Oklahoma; Oklahoma City University School of Law; University of Virginia School of Law

Patricia MacGuigan (September 8, 1939 – December 26, 2024) was an American attorney and judge who served on the Oklahoma Court of Civil Appeals from 1982 to 1991.

== Biography ==
Patricia Dougherty MacGuigan was born on September 8, 1939, in Beaver, Pennsylvania to Sarah Jessie McChain and Cliff Clark Dougherty Sr. She earned her bachelor's degree from the University of Oklahoma graduated from the Oklahoma City University School of Law in 1975. She also had a L.L.M. from the University of Virginia School of Law.

Early in her career, MacGuigan worked as an assistant district attorney in Oklahoma County and for Kerr-McGee. In 1982, she was appointed to the Oklahoma Court of Civil Appeals where she served until 1991. She later served as an administrative law judge for the Oklahoma Corporation Commission from 2003 to 2021. She died on December 26, 2024. She had two children.
