= Pablo Manlapit =

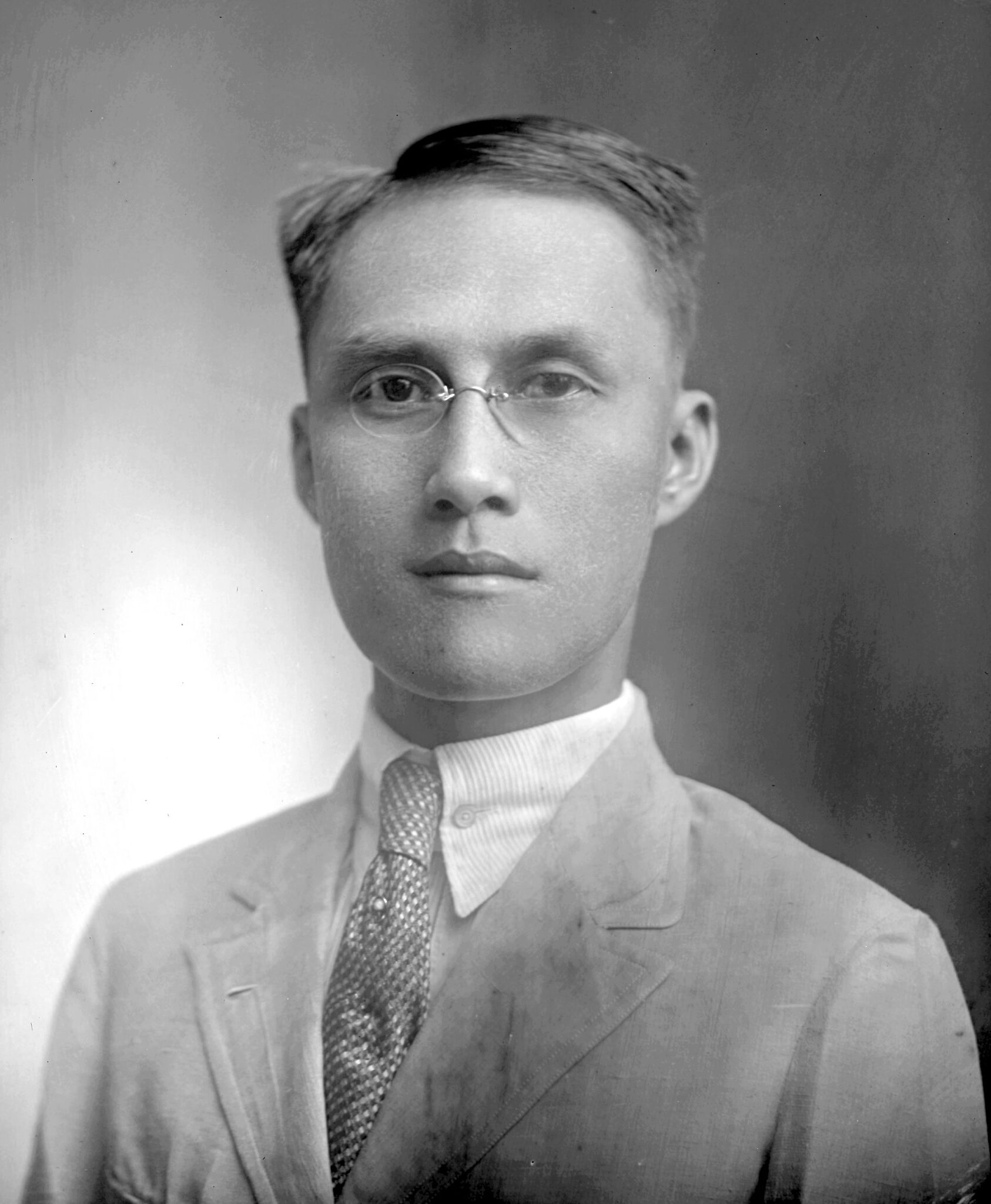
- Manlapit c. 1920s
- Born: 17 January 1891; Lipa
- Died: 15 April 1969 (aged 78); Philippines
- Occupations: Trade unionist, lawyer

Pablo Manlapit (January 17, 1891 – April 15, 1969) was a migrant laborer, lawyer, labor organizer, and activist in Hawaii, California, and the Philippines.

== Early life ==
Manlapit was born on January 17, 1891, in Lipa, Batangas, in the Philippines. He came to Hawaii in 1910 as a migrant worker and was under contract to work as a sugarcane plantation laborer at Hamakua Mill Company in the sugarcane fields of the Hāmākua district of the island of Hawaiʻi. Manlapit got promoted quickly from fieldwork to foreman (luna), then timekeeper. In June, 1912, he married Annie Kasby, a German-American born in Hawaii and they started to raise a family. They had four children, three girls and one boy between 1913 and 1921. Sometime in 1914 they left the plantation and moved to Hilo, then eventually they moved to Honolulu on Oahu before the year ended. After leaving the plantation Manlapit worked many different jobs, published a local Filipino newspaper, Ang Sandata, and studied law. In 1919, Manlapit passed the test for attorneys, obtained a license to practice law, and became the first Filipino lawyer in Hawaii.

== Status of Filipino migrants ==
From 1909, sugarcane plantation owners in Hawai'i increasingly relied on labor from the Philippines, as both legislation and diplomatic agreements with Japan, Korea and China - three of the principle sources of contract laborers on the island - impeded significant further migration from these countries. From 1909 to 1946, the corporation representing plantation owners, the Hawaiian Sugar Planters' Association (HSPA), recorded that 109,544 Filipino men came to Hawai'i for work, drawn by better economic prospects, word-of-mouth and aggressive HSPA recruitment tactics.

Having arrived, Filipino laborers encountered a strict system of racial stratification instituted by plantation management: housing was segregated; pay and promotions were based on race; and conditions were poor. They found that they had to buy everything at the plantation store, and often at highly inflated prices due to shipping and other costs. After living in Hawaii for a while, many began to resent the strict hand of the luna (foreman), as well as the social and racial discrimination they experienced. Moreover, they were not used to the commercial business system. Many believed the practice of fixed prices in the plantation stores to be a violation of their personal freedom because they were accustomed to bargaining in the Philippines.

== Organizing ==
Manlapit became one of the few Filipino lawyers in the 1920s and distinguished himself as spokesman for the Filipino labor movement in Hawaii, spending most of his time organizing and fighting for the rights of plantation laborers. He helped organize the Filipino Labor Union in Hawaii and was a leading figure in the strikes in 1920 and 1924 that involved thousands of plantation workers.

In October, 1919, the Japanese Federation of Labor and the Filipino Labor Union joined together to argue against the Hawaiian Sugar Planters' Association for a better working environment. They wanted to increase their salary from $0.72 to $1.25 and have 8 hour workdays. They wanted breaks for certain working conditions. On Oahu on January 19, 1920, 3,000 members of the Filipino Labor Union walked off their jobs. Manlapit led the strike and he believed that the Japanese and Filipinos workers should be united. The Japanese workers soon joined them. By early February 1920, 8300 plantation laborers were on strike, representing 77% of the work force. Filipino workers went on strike because they weren't paid equally for doing the same work as the Japanese workers. The Filipinos were paid $0.69 and the Japanese were paid $0.99. While they were on strike, plantation workers on other islands continued to work to raise about $600,000 in support of the strike. The 1920 Oahu strike lasted for two months and the strikers had to contend with a variety of methods utilized by the plantation owners: eviction of strikers from their homes, hiring of strikebreakers, and prosecution of leaders for conspiracies. Manlapit was not prosecuted but he was subjected to a smear campaign. He was accused of extorting money in exchange for calling off the strike. The plantation owners, assisted by the government, countered this with a "divide-and-counter" tactic. They charged the Japanese workers with attempting to make Hawaii an Asian province.

Later in the year, in an effort to counter racist accusations, the Hawaii Federation of Japanese Labor changed its name to the Hawaii Laborers' Association. They invited all workers of every race to join.

== Hanapēpē Massacre ==
So strong was his influence among his countrymen that Manlapit was implicated in the violent September, 1924 strike on Kauai—later known as the Hanapēpē Massacre—even though he was not present on the island. Sixteen strikers were killed during the confrontation with police, as well as four policemen.

This drew the ire of plantation owners and they persecuted him with various small charges. Manlapit was arrested, tried for conspiracy, convicted of libel, and sentenced to 2 to 10 years at Oahu Prison. In order to prevent his involvement in future activities in Hawaii, Manlapit was deported to the U.S. mainland while bearing a conditional parole judgment. Upon his parole, he went to California.

== Expulsion ==
In California, Manlapit also went into labor organizing until he traveled back to Hawaii in 1933. Again, he dove into the fray of labor organizing and this eventually led to his permanent expulsion from Hawaii and deportation to the Philippines in 1935. His family was broken because of this move. This ended his colorful but tragic career in the Hawaii labor movement.

== Later life ==
Manlapit's first marriage did not survive his turmoils of being a leader in organizing the plantation workers, his expulsion to California, and his deportation to the Philippines in 1934. Manlapit and Annie became officially divorced in December 1939. Manlapit married Ponciana Calderon in the Philippines and they had a son. Manlapit became active in organizing in the Philippines.

Manlapit worked for the Philippine government in the pre-World War II and postwar years. After WWII and the defeat of the Japanese who occupied the Philippines, Manlapit became part of the political circle. He supported Manuel Roxas in his presidency bid after World War II and served in some mid-level government positions.

In 1949 he returned to Hawaii to visit his children, but due to the government's non-stop harassment his stay was short. He returned to the Philippines. Becoming involved once more in labor matters, he mortgaged his family home to support Filipino workers on strike, and became homeless and poor. Manlapit died of cancer on April 15, 1969.

== Pardon and postmortem attempts to get his conviction overturned ==
Manlapit worked to get a pardon from governors of Hawaii. Governor Oren Long eventually granted him one in 1952.

As of May 2026, the Hawai‘i Filipino Lawyers Association is exploring whether his conviction can be overturned.

== Works ==
- Filipinos Fight for Justice: Case of the Filipino Laborers in the Big Strike of 1924, Territory of Hawaii. Honolulu: Kumalae Pub. Co. 1933. OCLC 16329877, 23331844.
- Message to Filipinos; Talumpati (in Filipino). New York: Columbia Phonograph. 1950. OCLC 663658979.
- Pablo Manlapit. 1959. OCLC 663374732.

== See also ==
- List of first minority male lawyers and judges in Hawaii
