= State Bar of South Dakota =

Bar Association

- Type: Legal Society
- Headquarters: Pierre, SD
- Location: United States
- Members: 2,756 in 2012 (870 out of state)
- Website: http://www.sdbar.org/

The State Bar of South Dakota is the integrated (mandatory) bar association of the U.S. state of South Dakota.

== History ==
The State Bar of South Dakota was established in 1931 by the South Dakota Legislature, pursuant to South Dakota Supreme Court Rule.

== Structure ==
The State Bar is governed by a Board of Bar Commissioners, consisting of three officers, 7 Commissioners elected by District, and 6 Commissioners elected at-large.

The State Bar dedicates $100 of each member's dues to Continuing Legal Education, entitling each member to attend all CLE programs without additional charge. It also publishes the Monthly State Bar of South Dakota Newsletter.
