= Tany S. Hong =

Judge and former Attorney General of Hawaii

Tany Sun Hong (February 3, 1931 – August 24, 2024) was an American attorney and judge in the state of Hawaii. He served as Attorney General of Hawaii from 1981 to 1984, under governor George Ariyoshi. He later served as a judge on the Hawaii District Court's first circuit, appointed by chief justice Herman Lum. Hong was born in Makawao, Maui, Hawaii. He earned a bachelor's degree at the University of Hawaiʻi in 1956 and his law degree from Gonzaga University in 1967, and prior to serving as attorney general, was the director of Hawaii's Department of Regulatory Agencies. He died in Honolulu on August 24, 2024, at the age of 93.
