= Ernest Isao Murai =

Hawaii political official

Ernest Isao Murai (September 12, 1900 – 1981) has been called one of the "founding fathers" of the modern-day Hawaii Democratic Party. He was also the US Director of Customs in Hawaii, a National Democratic Party Committeeman and the first Asian-American to serve on the Honolulu Police Commission.

== Background ==
Murai was born in Honolulu, Territory of Hawaii, the son of Japanese immigrants who originally migrated to Hawaii to work on the sugar plantations. His stevedore father sent him to California at the age of 16 for the increased educational opportunities and to remove him from a rough neighborhood. Murai attended the University of California at Berkeley and worked his way through dental school at the University of California San Francisco. He returned to Hawaii in 1926 to practice dentistry. He married Hazel Nakazawa in 1928 and they had three daughters.

== Career ==
Because of his professional status in the community, Murai became president of the Americans of Japanese Ancestry association in 1938. He was also the head of the Japanese Golf Society in Hawaii. When Pearl Harbor was attacked and war declared, Murai stepped up to become the chairman of the territory's Emergency Services Committee (ESC). The ESC was responsible for providing information to Japanese-American communities in Hawaii from the U.S. military government and organizing Japanese-American support for the US war effort. In 1942, Murai and his wife Hazel volunteered to escort 132 Japanese nationals from Hawaii across a potentially hostile US mainland to North Carolina to be repatriated to Japan. After escorting the Japanese, the couple visited Camp McCoy to visit US servicemen in training from Hawaii and the Japanese American internment camp at Tanforan.

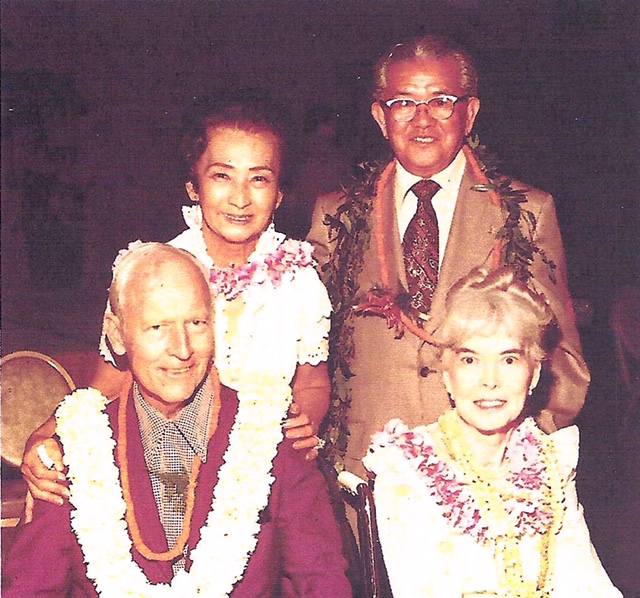
After working together during World War II, the Murais and Burns maintained their friendship during Burns' governorship.

Murai's leadership status in these organizations led to a lifelong friendship with the future, thrice elected Governor of the State of Hawaii John A. Burns. Because of nighttime curfew restrictions, then police captain John A. Burns was assigned to drive the Japanese-American members of the ESC, including Murai, whenever their assignments required. After the war, Burns, Murai, and others began to meet to discuss ways to help the returning "GI's." Some of the servicemen, such as Daniel Inouye, were recruited into local politics.

Burns, Murai and others organized and stumped for Democrats at the grassroots level, eventually bringing about the 1954 Hawaii Democratic Party uprising when the party took over the legislature from the previously dominant Republican Party. Earlier In 1951, Burns and his group pushed to have Murai appointed to the police commission and several years later he was elected to the Democratic National committeeman seat. Because of his role on the Democratic National Committee and his support for the election of John Kennedy, Murai was appointed as the US Collector of Customs for Hawaii in 1961, a post he held for 12 years. Ernest Murai died in 1981 at the age of 80.
