= Brooke (given name) =

- Gender: Unisex (mostly female)

Origin
- Language: English

Other names
- Related names: Brook, Brooks

The name Brooke is most commonly a female given name and less commonly a male given name, also used as a surname. Other forms include Brook. The name "Brooke" is of English origin.

Notable people and characters with this name include:

== Female ==
- Brooke Abel (born 1988), American synchronized swimmer
- Brooke Ackerly, American political scientist and professor
- Brooke Adams (disambiguation), several people
- Brooke Addamo (born 1991), birth name of Owl Eyes, Australian recording artist
- Brooke Alexander (born 1963), American beauty queen and actress
- Brooke Alexx, American singer-songwriter
- Brooke Allison (born 1986), American singer
- Brooke Amber Williams (born 1982), New Zealand netball player
- Brooke Ammerman (born 1990), American ice hockey player
- Brooke Andersen (born 1995), American track and field athlete
- Brooke Anderson (born 1978), American television personality
- Brooke Anderson (actress) (born 1981), Australian actress, writer, film director, film producer, and singer
- Brooke Angus, American beauty pageant titleholder
- Brooke Annibale (born 1987), American singer-songwriter and musician
- Brooke Apshkrum (born 1999), Canadian luger
- Brooke Aspin (born 2005), English footballer
- Brooke Astor (1902–2007), American socialite and philanthropist
- Brooke Austin (born 1995), American tennis player
- Brooke Axtell, American human rights activist, writer, speaker, and performing artist
- Brooke Bailey Johnson, American television executive
- Brooke Baldwin (born 1979), American television personality
- Brooke Barbuto (born 1987), American soccer player
- Brooke Barrettsmith (born 1982), American singer, songwriter, and musician
- Brooke Barzun (born 1972), American art curator and philanthropist
- Brooke Becker (born 2002), American ice hockey player
- Brooke Bennett (born 1980), American swimmer
- Brooke Berman (born 1969/1970), American playwright and author
- Brooke Berry, American Playboy model
- Brooke Bloom, American actress
- Brooke Blurton (born 1995), Australian youth worker and media personality
- Brooke Boden (born c. 1973), American politician
- Brooke Bolander, American author of speculative fiction
- Brooke Boney (born 1987), Australian journalist and television presenter
- Brooke Boquist (born 1996), Canadian PHF player
- Brooke Borel, American science journalist, scientist, and author
- Brooke Brewer (1894–1970), American athlete
- Brooke Brodack (born 1986), American YouTube personality
- Brooke Bruk-Jackson (born 2002), Zimbabwean model and beauty pageant titleholder
- Brooke Bryant (born 2000), American ice hockey player
- Brooke Bundy (born 1944), American actress
- Brooke Burfitt (born 1988), English actress and radio presenter
- Brooke Burke (born 1971), American actress, dancer, model, and television personality
- Brooke Burns (born 1978), American model, actress, and television personality
- Brooke Buschkuehl (born 1993), Australian long jumper
- Brooke Butler, American actress
- Brooke Candy (born 1989), American rapper, singer, songwriter, and tattoo artist
- Brooke Castile (born 1986), American figure skater
- Brooke Chaplen (born 1989), English football player and manager
- Brooke Ciardelli, American theater and film director, producer, and writer
- Brooke Crain (born 1993), American BMX cyclist
- Brooke Crowder, American founder of The Refuge Ranch
- Brooke D. Anderson (born 1964), American diplomat
- Brooke D'Hondt (born 2005), Canadian snowboarder
- Brooke D'Orsay (born 1982), Canadian actress
- Brooke Daniels, American beauty pageant titleholder
- Brooke Davis (disambiguation), several people
- Brooke DeBerdine (born 1999), American field hockey player
- Brooke de Lench (born 1952), American author, filmmaker, journalist, and advocate
- Brooke Dillman, American actress and comedian
- Brooke Disher (born 2004), Canadian ice hockey player
- Brooke Donoghue (born 1995), New Zealand rower
- Brooke D'Orsay (born 1982), Canadian actress
- Brooke Duff (born 1991), New Zealand recording artist and songwriter
- Brooke E. Flammang, American biologist
- Brooke E. Sheldon (1931–2013), American librarian and educator
- Brooke Eden (born 1988), American country music singer and songwriter
- Brooke Elby (born 1993), American NWSL player
- Brooke Elliott (born 1974), American actress and singer
- Brooke Ellison (1978–2024), American academic, disability advocate, and quadriplegic
- Brooke Evers (born 1985), Australian television personality, model, actress, dancer, producer, and DJ
- Brooke Feldmeier (born 1996), American track and field athlete
- Brooke Fletcher, American sportscaster and beauty pageant titleholder
- Brooke Forde (born 1999), American swimmer
- Brooke Fraser (born 1983), New Zealand singer-songwriter
- Brooke Frieling (born 1986), American ice dancer
- Brooke Gladstone (born 1955), American journalist, author, and media analyst
- Brooke Goldstein, Canadian human rights attorney
- Brooke Gondara, American academic administrator, activist, and advocate for women and minorities in higher education
- Brooke Green, American politician and businesswoman
- Brooke Greenberg (1993–2013), American Syndrome X patient
- Brooke Grossman (born 1978), American politician from Maryland
- Brooke Gysen (born 1977), Australian gymnast
- Brooke Halliday (born 1995), New Zealand cricketer
- Brooke Halvorsen (born 1990), Canadian volleyball player
- Brooke Hanson (born 1978), Australian swimmer
- Brooke Harlow, American businesswoman
- Brooke Harman, American-born Australian actress
- Brooke Harrington, American economic sociologist
- Brooke Harris (born 1997), Australian cricketer
- Brooke Hayward (born 1937), American actress
- Brooke Henderson (born 1997), Canadian golfer
- Brooke Hendrix (born 1993), American WSL player
- Brooke Henson (born 1978), alternate name of Esther Reed, American convicted criminal
- Brooke Hepburn (born 1990), Australian cricketer
- Brooke Hobson (born 1999), Canadian ice hockey player
- Brooke Hogan (born 1988), American singer, actress, model, television personality
- Brooke Holmes, American classicist
- Brooke hyland, American dancer
- Brooke Jackson-Glidden (born 1994/1995), American food writer and editor
- Brooke Jenkins (born 1981/1982), American lawyer
- Brooke Kamin Rapaport, American artistic director and chief curator
- Brooke Kennedy, American television producer and director
- Brooke Kinsella (born 1983), British actress, author, and anti-knife crime campaigner
- Brooke Knapp (born 1940), American aviator, entrepreneur, realtor, and record holder
- Brooke Kroeger, American journalist, writer, and professor emerita
- Brooke Krueger-Billett (born 1980), Australian hammer thrower
- Brooke Langton (born 1970), American actress
- Brooke Lauren (born 1984), American film- and television producer, actress, and photographer
- Brooke Lewis Bellas (born 1975), American actress, producer, writer, author, TV personality, and philanthropist
- Brooke Lierman (born 1979), American civil rights attorney and politician
- Brooke Lochland (born 1991), Australian AFLW player and former speed skater
- Brooke Locklear Clark (born 1979), American district court judge
- Brooke Lyons (born 1980), American actress
- Brooke Magnanti (born 1975), American-born British scientist, blogger, and writer
- Brooke Marie Bridges, American actress
- Brooke Mayo, American soccer assistant referee
- Brooke McCarty-Williams (born 1995), American basketball player
- Brooke McClymont (born 1981), Australian singer, songwriter, and guitarist
- Brooke McFarlane (born 1973), Australian cricketer
- Brooke McIntosh (born 2005), Canadian pair skater
- Brooke McLaurin (born 1981), American beauty pageant titleholder
- Brooke Medicine Eagle (born 1943), American author, singer-songwriter, and teacher
- Brooke Miller (disambiguation), several people
- Brooke Mitchell, American beauty pageant titleholder
- Brooke Mooney (born 1996), American rower
- Brooke Morrison (born 1979), Australian field hockey player
- Brooke Mosteller, American beauty pageant titleholder
- Brooke Mueller (born 1977), American actress
- Brooke Neal (born 1992), New Zealand field hockey player
- Brooke Nevin (born 1982), Canadian actress
- Brooke N. Newman, American historian
- Brooke Nicholls, Canadian contemporary worship music singer and songwriter
- Brooke Niles (born 1981), American beach volleyball player
- Brooke O'Harra, American director, playwright, and performer
- Brooke Olzendam, American sportscaster
- Brooke Owens (1980–2016), American pilot and space policy expert
- Brooke Palsson (born 1993), Canadian actress and singer-songwriter
- Brooke Pancake (born 1990), American golfer
- Brooke Patterson (born 1989), Australian footballer
- Brooke Peris (born 1993), Australian field hockey player
- Brooke Pinto (born 1991/1992), American attorney and politician
- Brooke Pratley (born 1980), Australian rower
- Brooke Prentis (born 1980), Australian Aboriginal Christian leader
- Brooke Queenan (born 1984), American WNBA player
- Brooke Raboutou (born 2001), American rock climber
- Brooke Ramel, American singer-songwriter
- Brooke Rangi (born 1982), New Zealand footballer
- Brooke Richards (born 1976), American Playboy model
- Brooke Skylar Richardson (born 1999), American woman guilty of infanticide
- Brooke Roberts, American television and comic book writer
- Brooke Roberts (entrepreneur), New Zealand businesswoman
- Brooke Roberts (field hockey) (born 1995), New Zealand field hockey player
- Brooke Rogers, British psychologist and professor
- Brooke Rollins (born 1972), United States Secretary of Agriculture
- Brooke Satchwell, Australian actress, model, and environmental spokesperson
- Brooke Schultz (born 1999), American diver
- Brooke Scullion (born 1999), Irish singer and Eurovision contestant
- Brooke Shaden (born 1987), American fine art photographer
- Brooke Shearer (1950–2009), American private investigator and journalist
- Brooke Shields (born 1965), American actress and model
- Brooke Shipley, American mathematician
- Brooke Simpson (born 1991), American singer
- Brooke Singer, American media artist and professor
- Brooke Smith (disambiguation), several people
- Brooke Spence (born 1988), Australian soccer player
- Brooke Stacey (born 1996), Canadian PHF player
- Brooke Staricha, American contestant on America's Next Top Model (season 6)
- Brooke Stockham (born 1982), Australian Paralympic swimmer
- Brooke Stoehr (born 1980), American basketball player and coach
- Brooke Struck, American contestant on Survivor (American TV series)
- Brooke Sweat (born 1986), American beach volleyball player
- Brooke T. Mossman, American pathologist and professor
- Brooke Tessmacher (born 1984), American wrestler
- Brooke Theiss (born 1969), American actress
- Brooke Thompson (born 1984), Australian netball player
- Brooke Totman (born 1978), American actress
- Brooke Valentine (born 1984), American singer-songwriter
- Brooke Vallone, American actress
- Brooke Van Poppelen (born 1978), American comedian, actress, and writer
- Brooke Van Sickle (born 1998), Filipino volleyball player
- Brooke van Velden (born 1992), New Zealand politician
- Brooke Vernon (born 2001), Australian AFLW player
- Brooke Vincent (born 1992), English actress
- Brooke Voigt (born 1993), Canadian freestyle snowboarder
- Brooke Waggoner (born 1984), American singer-songwriter
- Brooke Walker (disambiguation), several people
- Brooke Weisbrod, American sportscaster, college basketball analyst, and reporter
- Brooke Wentz, American record producer and music director
- Brooke White (born 1983), American folk-pop singer and American Idol contestant
- Brooke Whitney (born 1979), American NWHL- and ECAC player
- Brooke Whyte (born 1995), Australian footballer
- Brooke Wilberger (1985–2004), American murder victim
- Brooke Wilkins (born 1974), Australian softball player
- Brooke Williams (born 1984), New Zealand actress
- Brooke Williamson (born 1978/1979), American chef, restaurateur, and television personality
- Brooke Wolejko (born 1996), American PHF player
- Brooke Wyckoff (born 1980), American basketball player and coach

== Male ==
- Brooke Benjamin (1929–1995), English mathematical physicist and mathematician
- Brooke Boothby (disambiguation), several people
- Brooke Cadwallader (1908–1994), American textile designer
- Brooke Claxton (1898–1960), Canadian soldier, lawyer, legal scholar, and politician
- Brooke Dolan II (1908–1945), American adventurer and naturalist
- Brooke Evans (1797–1862), English nickel refiner, weapons manufacturer, and geologist
- Brooke Forester (1717–1774), British politician
- Brooke Foss Westcott (1825–1901), English bishop, biblical scholar, and theologian
- Brooke Gallupe, Canadian indie rock singer and songwriter
- Brooke Guest (born 1997), English cricketer
- Brooke Hart (1911–1933), American businessman who was kidnapped and murdered
- Brooke Knight (born 1972), American baseball and football player and manager
- Brooke Lambert (1834–1901), English cleric and social reformer
- Brooke Lynn Hytes (born 1986), Canadian-American drag queen, ballet dancer, and television personality
- Brooke Makler (1951–2010), American fencer
- Brooke McCarter (1963–2015), American actor, producer, director, composer, and musician
- Brooke McEldowney (born 1952), American cartoonist, writer, and musician
- Brooke Nihart (1919–2006), American marine, Navy Cross recipient, and historian
- Brooke Norton-Cuffy (born 2004), English footballer
- Brooke Robinson (1836–1911), English politician and philanthropist
- Brooke Stevens, American fantasy and thriller writer
- Brooke Taylor (born 1950), Canadian politician

== Fictional characters ==
- Brooke, in the UK TV soap opera EastEnders, played by Ria Lopez
- Brooke, in the 2016 US animated adventure comedy film Ice Age: Collision Course, voiced by Jessie J
- Brooke Armstrong, in the US TV soap opera Melrose Place, played by Kristin Davis
- Brooke Butler, in the Australian TV soap opera Neighbours, played by Fifi Box
- Brooke Davis, in the US TV series One Tree Hill, played by Sophia Bush
- Brooke Doherty, in the US TV drama series Third Watch, played by Eva LaRue
- Brooke Dubek, in the US comedy TV series The Other Two, played by Heléne Yorke
- Brooke English, in the US TV soap opera All My Children, played by Elissa Leeds, Julia Barr, and Harriet Hall
- Brooke Freeman, in the New Zealand soap opera Shortland Street, played by Beth Allen
- Brooke Haslett, in the Canadian crime TV series Missing, played by Gloria Reuben
- Brooke Logan, in the US TV soap opera The Bold and the Beautiful, played by Katherine Kelly Lang
- Brooke Lohst, in the book Be More Chill
- Brooke Lundgren, in the children's novel series Grey Griffins
- Brooke Maddox, in the US anthology slasher TV series Scream, played by Carlson Young
- Brooke Mathison, in the US political thriller drama TV series Designated Survivor, played by Mariana Klaveno
- Brooke McCallister, one of Kevin's cousins in Home Alone and its sequel
- Brooke McQueen, in the US teen comedy-drama TV series Popular, played by Leslie Bibb
- Brooke Meyers, in the 2006 US romantic-comedy film The Break-Up, played by Jennifer Aniston
- Brooke Page, in the Mattel franchise Ever After High
- Brooke Stadler, Jo Wilson's former name in Grey's Anatomy
- Brooke Thompson, in the US horror anthology TV series American Horror Story, played by Emma Roberts

== See also ==
- Brooke (disambiguation)
