= Mossman (surname) =

Mossman is a Scottish and Northern English surname, originally of Dutch or Flemish origin.

== People with the name ==
- Bina Mossman (1893–1990), American musician and politician
- Brooke T. Mossman, American pathologist
- Burton C. Mossman (1867–1956), American lawman and cattleman
- Dave Mossman (born 1964), English footballer
- Douglas Mossman (1933–2021), American actor
- Dow Mossman (born 1943), American author
- Francis Mossman (born 1988), New Zealand actor, model, and journalist
- David James Mossman (1926–1971), British broadcaster
- John Mossman (1817–1890), English sculptor
- Judith Mossman (disambiguation)
- Karen Mossman, Canadian virologist
- Matilda Mossman, American basketball coach
- Maunakea Mossman (born 1975), American professional wrestler
- Michael Philip Mossman (born 1959), American jazz trumpeter
- Stuart Mossman (1942–1999), American guitar maker and entertainer
- Thomas Wimberly Mossman, Anglican clergyman who translated some of the New Testament commentaries of Cornelius a Lapide into English
- William Mossman (1793–1851), Scottish sculptor

== See also ==
- Mossman (disambiguation)
- Mosman (disambiguation)
