= Brooks =

Brooks may refer to:

- Brook (small stream)

== Places ==
=== Antarctica ===
- Cape Brooks

=== Canada ===
- Brooks, Alberta

=== United Kingdom ===
- Brooks, Cornwall
- Brooks, Powys, a location

=== United States ===
- Brooks, Alabama
- Brooks, Arkansas
- Brooks, California
- Brooks, Georgia
- Brooks, Iowa
- Brooks, Kentucky
- Brooks, Maine
- Brooks Township, Michigan
- Brooks, Minnesota
- Brooks, Montana
- Brooks, Oregon
- Brooks, San Antonio, Texas
- Brooks City-Base, built on former United States Air Force base near San Antonio, Texas
- Brooks, Wisconsin
- Brooks Lake, a lake in Minnesota
- Brooks Glacier, Alaska
  - Mount Brooks

=== United States and Canada ===
- Brooks Range, mountain range in Alaska and Yukon

== People ==
- Brooks (given name)
- Brooks (surname)
- Brooks (DJ), Dutch DJ, producer and musician

== Fictional characters ==
- Brooks Hatlen, in the 1994 film The Shawshank Redemption, played by James Whitmore
- Constance "Connie" Brooks (see Our Miss Brooks), fictional English language teacher
- Dustin Brooks, in the TV series Power Rangers Ninja Storm
- Earl Brooks, the title character of Mr. Brooks, a film
- Blade (character), also known as Eric Brooks in the Marvel Universe
  - Blade (New Line Blade franchise character), the New Line Cinema adaptation of Blade, portrayed by Wesley Snipes and Sticky Fingaz, from whom the Eric Brooks name originates

== Companies ==
- Brooks Automation, provider of automation, vacuum and instrumentation solutions
- Brooks Brothers, American men's clothier
- Brooks England, manufacturer of traditional English bicycle saddles
- Brooks Instrument, manufacturer of flow control and measurement equipment
- Brooks Locomotive Works, an early manufacturer of steam locomotives for the US railroads
- Brooks Pharmacy, former pharmacy chain
- Brooks Sports, American athletic shoe manufacturer

== Education ==
- Brooks High School (disambiguation)
- Brooks College, a defunct for-profit college in California
- Brooks College of Health, a college of University of North Florida
- Brooks Institute, a for-profit college in California focusing on visual arts
- Brooks School, North Andover, Massachusetts, United States

== Other uses ==
- Brooks (band), a 1970s UK vocal group
- Comet Brooks (disambiguation), various comets
- Brooks (mango), a late-season mango cultivar originated in Miami, Florida
- An early, minor league name for the Brooklyn Dodgers, former Major League Baseball team, now the Los Angeles Dodgers
- Brooks (crater), a crater on the southwestern part Mercury
- Brooks, a British slave ship

== See also ==
- Brock (disambiguation)
- Brooks Creek (disambiguation)
- Brooks's, a gentlemen's club in St James's Street, London
- Brooksville (disambiguation)
- Brook (disambiguation)
