= Brookie =

Brookie may refer to:

- Brookie (food), a dessert made by combining a brownie and a cookie
- A nickname for someone named Brooke
- Brook trout, a type of fish native to Eastern North America
- Brooklyn Supreme, the largest horse ever recorded
- A recipient of a Brooke Owens Fellowship for undergraduate women in aerospace
- Brookside, a British soap opera set in Liverpool, England
