= Hot Wells (San Antonio, Texas) =

Historic spa

Coordinates: 29.3662°N 98.4700°W

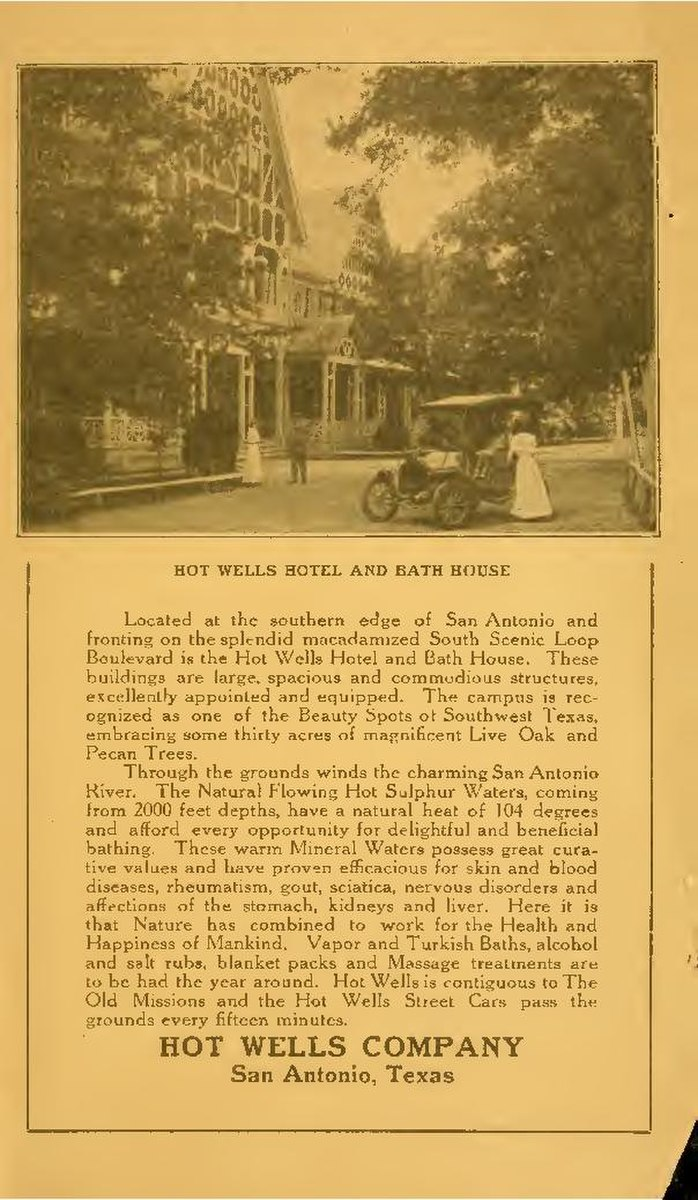
From "The San Antonio fact book ... a book for every tourist, every homeseeker, every official, every business man, every teacher, every student, every resident of Texas and San Antonio" (1915)

Hot Wells is the site of a cultural historical park in San Antonio, Texas. The park complements Texas' only World Heritage Site—the nearby San Antonio Missions National Historical Park—and the Mission Reach of the San Antonio River Walk. The park is located on the east side of the San Antonio River, directly across South Presa Street from the San Antonio State Hospital, along the tracks of the Southern Pacific Railroad and within sight of Mission San José across the river. Prior to the arrival of the Spanish, the land was originally inhabited by Coahuiltecan peoples.

== History ==
=== Artesian well at an asylum ===
An artesian well was discovered on land then owned by the Southwestern Lunatic Asylum (also known as the Southeastern Insane Asylum, now known as the San Antonio State Hospital) in 1892—the same year the hospital opened. Intended to provide water for the asylum, the well was dug 1750 feet deep and yielded 180,000 gallons of water per day. But the water had a temperature of 103-104 degrees Fahrenheit and smelled strongly of sulphur. It was found unfit for daily use by the facility so the sulphur water was leased to Charles Scheuermeyer who became a pioneer in the field of water resources development and the earliest to emphasize the medicinal properties of the local sulphur water. As analyzed by G.H. Wooton, a chemist at the State University in Austin, the mineral waters aided in the relief of blood poisoning, kidney, liver and skin diseases and rheumatism. Scheuermeyer placed a full-page ad in San Antonio's 1892-93 city directory for his Natural Hot Sulphur Natatorium at the Southwestern Park.

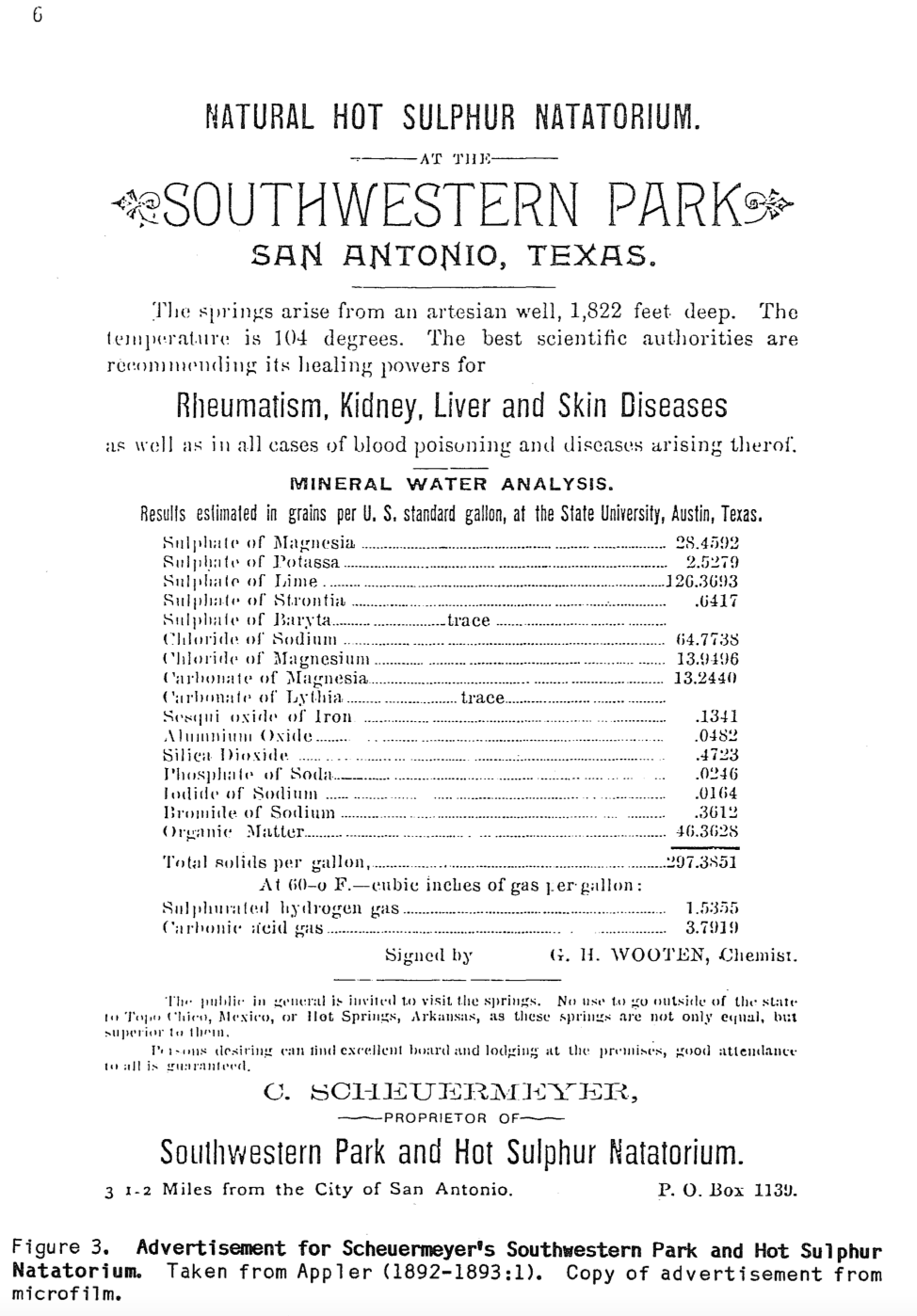
Ad for Hot Sulphur Natatorium in San Antonio city directory (1892–93)

=== Scheuermeyer to Shacklett ===
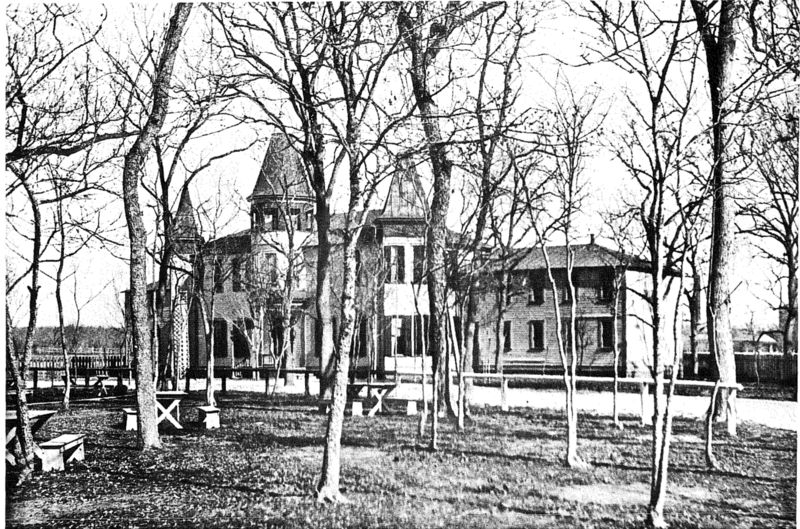
Hot Sulphur Wells (1894)

In 1893, McClellan Shacklett's bid to lease the water exceeded Scheuermeyer's; Shacklett was to build a first-class bathhouse and a sanatarium or hotel housing 200 guests with the Arkansas Hot Springs resort as his model. In June 1893, Shacklett bought a 10-acre riverside pecan grove about 400 yards from the hot sulphur which he landscaped with a carriage drive to his resort known as Natural Hot Sulphur Wells or, simply, Hot Sulpher Baths. The bathhouse's first floor entrance led to an office with carpeted parlors on each side—one for ladies and one for gentlemen; behind the parlors was a large pool filled with hot sulphur water from 2000 feet below. Dressing rooms, private reclining rooms and solo baths were available; a pavilion provided a restaurant. Bathing and drinking the sulphur water in the summer of 1894 purportedly promoted relief from "diseases of the liver, kidneys, stomach and bowels" and was "a certain cure for syphilitic and mercurial diseases peculiar to females, also rheumatism, whether it is inflammatory, sciatica, rheumatic gout or paralysis. For ulceration of the stomach, dyspepsia, indigestion, chronic diarrhea, malaria, biliousness, asthma, catarrh, sore or weak eyes, granulation and all inflammation of the eyelids, weak back, piles, tapeworms...will positively cure scrofula, or King's evil, all eruptions and skin diseases, such as eczema, erysipelas, blotches, boils, carbuncles, tetter, scaldhead, ringworm, herpes, chilblains, falling out of hair, itch, nettlerash, and old chronic sores that have resisted treatment." Hot Sulphur Wells' first ball was held on February 28, 1894; visitors swam as a string band played, dinner and dancing followed. With warmer weather crowds came to the Hot Sulphur Wells; electric streetcars ran every twenty minutes into the central city. By summer's end, the sulphur water flowed 1,200,000 gallons a day. The site was a veritable zoo: the notorious Judge Roy Bean freight shipped a mountain lion and a black bear from Langtry, Texas, to the Wells, adding to Shacklett's other exotic animal acquisitions.

=== First fire ===
On December 23, 1894, an early morning fire flashed through the Shacklett's bathhouse; he was asleep not far from the bathhouse when a neighbor woke him to engulfing flames and collapsing wings. Shacklett saved five guests from the smoke and rescued a sixth from the burning roof over the pool. The entire building was gone within an hour.

Nearly a year later, investors from the North had secured a 25-year lease from the asylum, and in January 1900 two land tracts were bought by the Texas Hot Sulphur Water Sanitarium Company fully ousting Shacklett from the site. The company's president was Otto Koehler who in two years would also lead the San Antonio Brewing Association (later known as Pearl Brewery) and in coming years would be regarded as the richest man in the southern part of the U.S. only to be murdered in 1914.

By September 1900, a new natatorium was serving "ladies," "gents" and families in three respective public swimming pools measuring 64' x 90' each. Twenty two acres were under development by the Texas Hot Sulphur Water Sanitarium Company across from the Southwestern Lunatic Asylum; Koehler's company bought a third tract in 1901. By then San Antonio's Hot Sulphur Baths were being characterized by the press as the "famous" resort, "Mecca of the health seekers and tourists this winter," reporting remarkable cures for a full array of ailments and boasts that Hot Sulphur Baths would soon be North America's most famous resort.

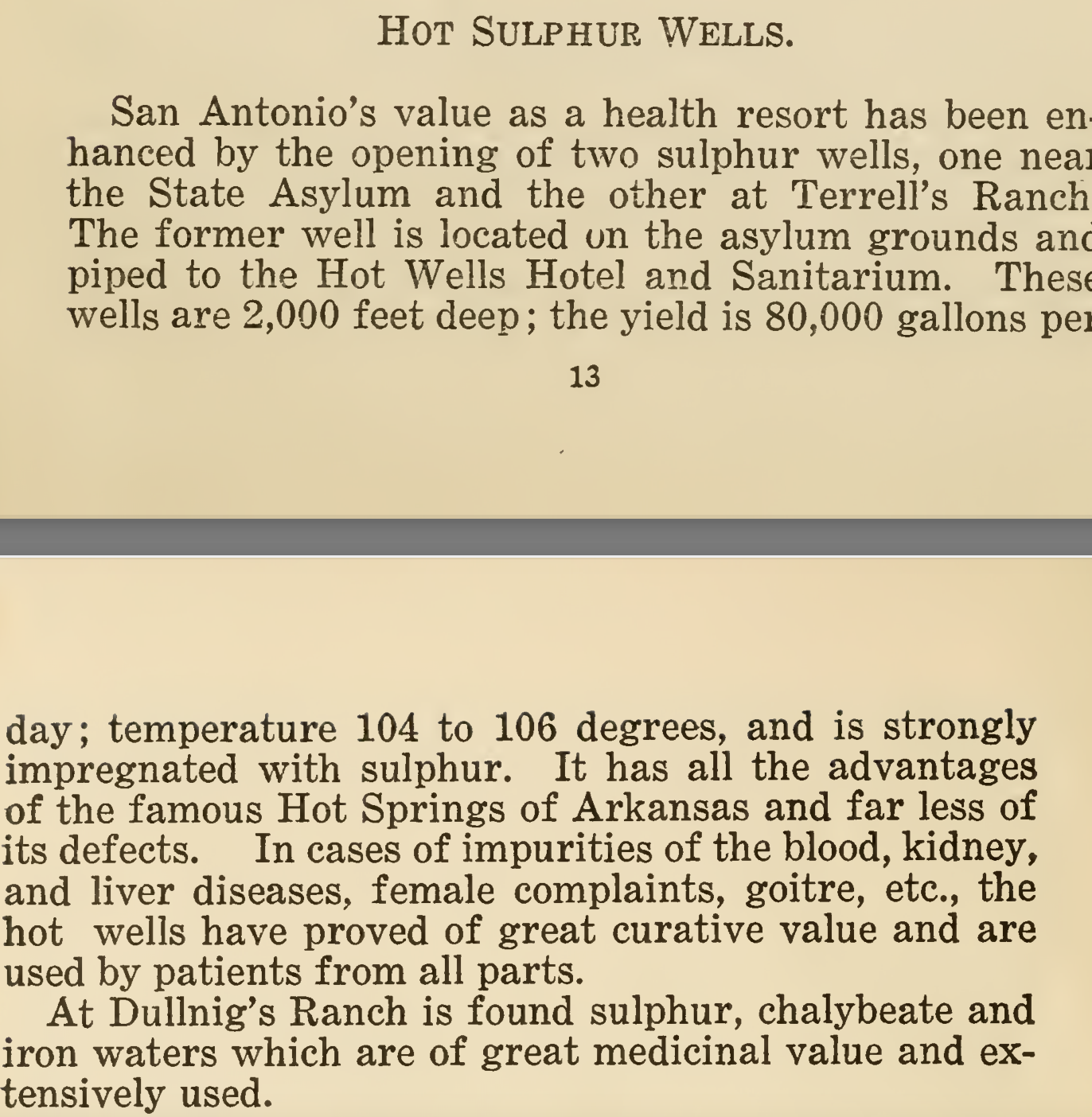
From Henry Ryder-Taylor's "Visitors Guide and History of San Antonio, TX, from the foundation 1689 to the present time..." (1908)

By 1902, according to a Souvenir of the City of San Antonio, the three-story Hot Wells Hotel had 80 rooms with modern conveniences including first-class furnishings, individual telephones to the main office, steam heat, electric and gas lights, and hot and cold water. The octagonal bathhouse had 45 private bathrooms each with porcelain tubs, marble partitions and tile floors. Guests were segregated by sex for Roman, Russian or Turkish, steam, needle and shower baths. The water ran at 104 degrees but could be individually controlled. Three public pools (64 feet by 90 feet each) were lined with white enameled brick. The Hot Wells spa was reputed to have better water quality than either the then-popular Hot Springs, Arkansas, or the then-acclaimed Carlsbad, Germany, spas. As elsewhere, bathing was dissuaded if suffering lung problems—it was thought the water's warmth would cause suffocation by "clos[ing] the lungs." Syphilis sufferers were made to bathe privately. In addition to swimming parties, there were domino parties, concerts and lectures there during these early years. The Hot Wells Bowling Club played on nine- and ten-pin alleys. There seems to have been a long tradition of Friday night dances at the Southwestern Insane Asylum where hotel guests frequently fraternized with and without patients present.

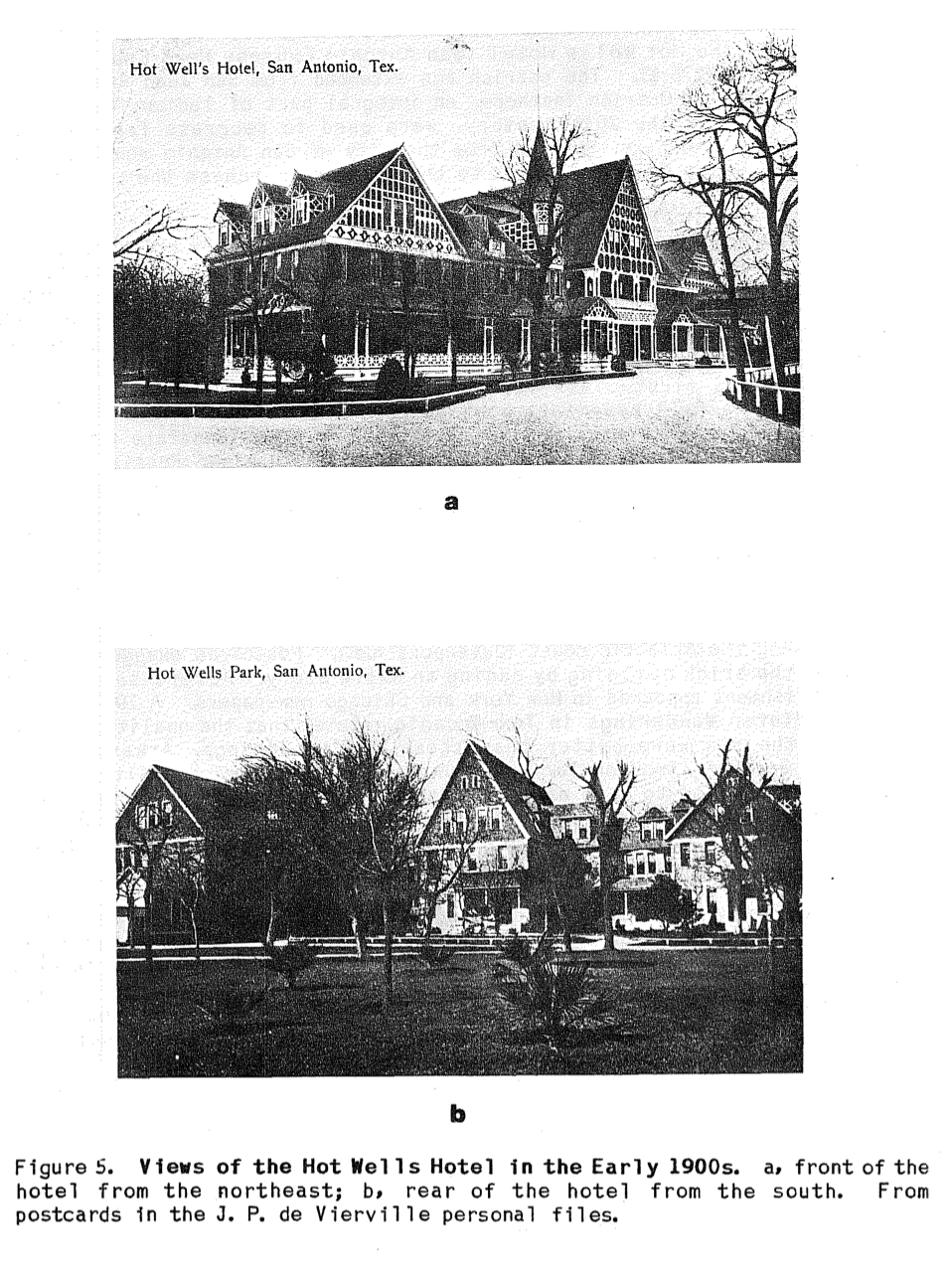
Views of Hot Wells Hotel in the early 1900s from the personal files of Jonathan Paul de Vierville

=== Swearington and Harriman ===
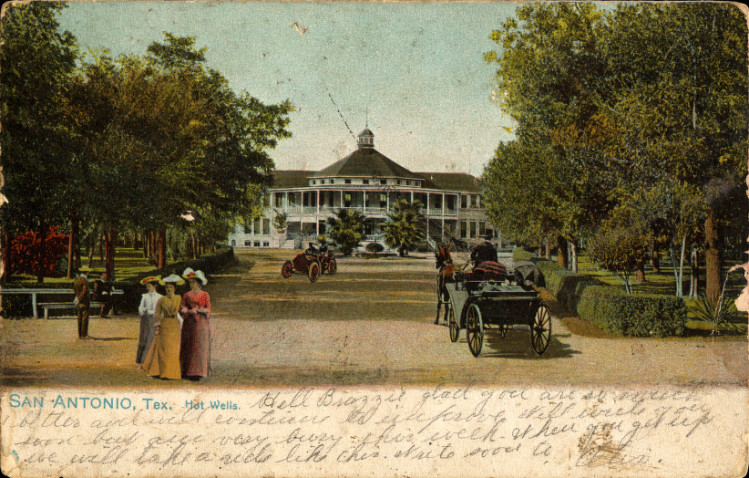
Hot Wells, San Antonio (April 1907)

By 1906, F.M. Swearington held a five-year lease on the Hot Wells Hotel property and reported that approximately two thousand guests seeking room and spa services had to be turned away due to lack of rooms. In late 1907, the Hot Wells Company began work on an L-shaped addition with ninety rooms so that by early 1908 the Hot Wells Hotel would have 190 rooms establishing it as one of the largest southwest Texas hotels. Improvements also included a new dining room plus palm garden. Railroad tycoon and Southern Pacific Railroad president E.H. Harriman, planned to recuperate at the Hot Wells resort in February 1909. He had a spur or side track extend the San Antonio and Aransas Pass Railway tracks onto the Hot Wells property. This extravagance also involved the installation of telegraph and telephone lines in a private car for Harriman so he could continue to conduct his railroad business from San Antonio. To take full advantage of the San Antonio climate, Harriman also had four wood-floored tents erected near the river for himself and his business entourage. Each tent had electric heaters and light, four rocking chairs, two oak dressers, two white-enameled iron beds and a small table as a desk. Harriman's health improved by bathing, hiking, shooting with a six-shooter mud turtles in the river, hosting luncheons, golfing, going to banquets and theatrical performances; nonetheless, the tycoon died in September 1909. Others at Hot Wells during this era enjoyed boating, bowling, croquet, equestrian activities, swimming and tennis among other sports. A swinging bridge was suspended across the San Antonio River so guests could access the Mission San José ruins.

=== Star Film Company ===
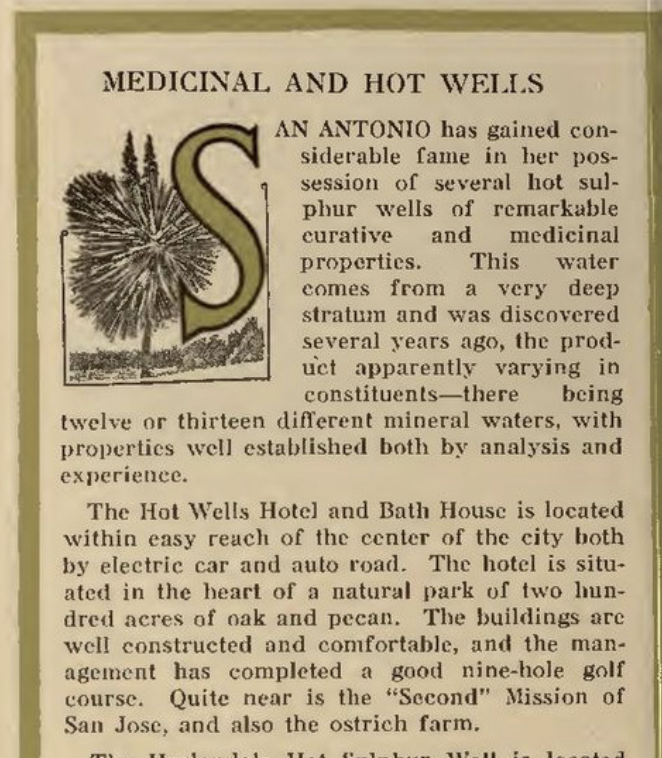
From a Southern Pacific Company brochure (c. 1916)

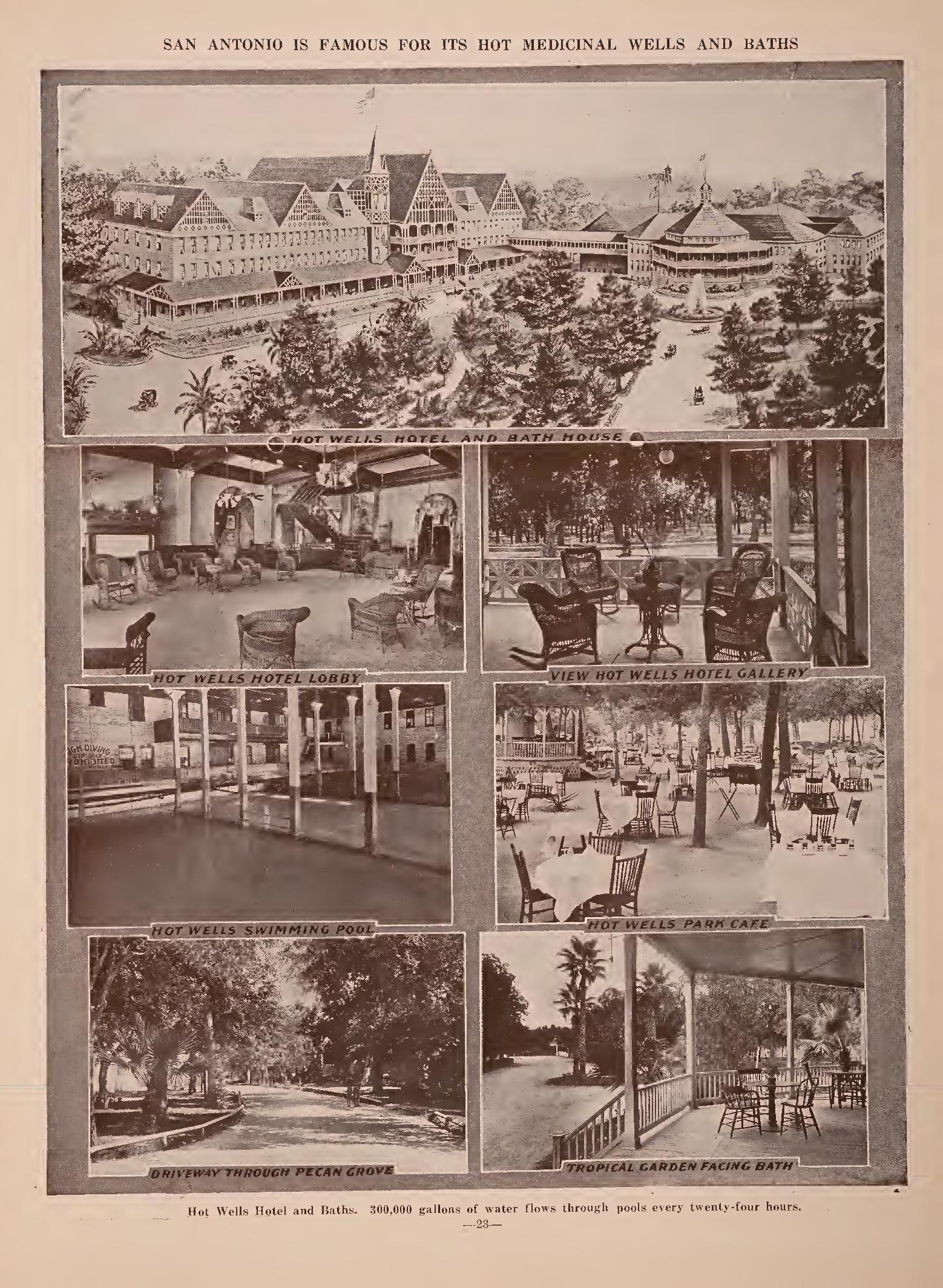
From "Great San Antonio, the city of destiny and of your destination," 1923, page 23

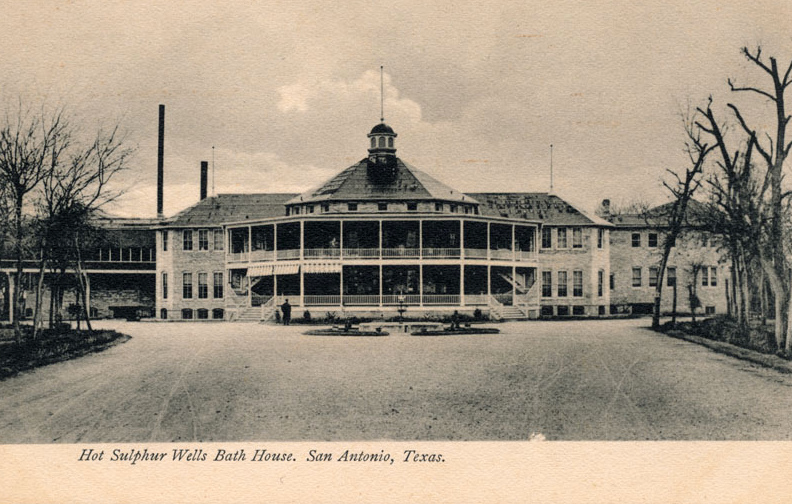
Hot Sulphur Wells Bathhouse at Hot Wells, San Antonio, pre-1923

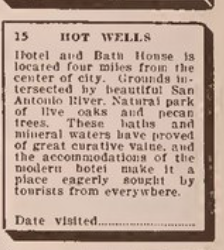
From "Great San Antonio, the city of destiny and of your destination," 1923, page 23

The Star Film Company opened the Star Film Ranch across the river from Hot Wells in January 1910 and was based on twenty acres near Mission San Jose only through the spring of 1911 when operations shifted to California. In that short time, at least sixty silent movies were shot there. Company manager Gaston Melies situated a film studio across the river and other film companies evidently filmed early westerns in the vicinity of Hot Wells. His wife joined Melies in San Antonio as did her cousin, actress Sarah Bernhardt, who came in a private railway car for a two-week visit. At the outset of his acclaimed career, film director Cecil B. DeMille also visited Star Film Company in San Antonio, staying at the Hot Wells Hotel. A sulphur well was dug on the Hot Wells property by the height of the resort's popularity, obsolescing reliance on the asylum's water source. Guests also came for the gambling—the Hot Wells Jockey club had a resident bookie and betting on ostrich races staged by Houston zookeeper F.W. Anderson on Sundays at an adjacent ostrich farm where eggs could be bought for a buck before ostrich feathers became less de riguer in women's fashions. Famous folks also flocked to the resort at its height--Charlie Chaplin, Porfirio Díaz, Douglas Fairbanks Sr., Hoot Gibson, Mrs. J.P. Morgan, Tom Mix, Theodore Roosevelt, Will Rogers and Rudolph Valentino—all also allegedly stayed at the Hot Wells Hotel.

=== El Dorado School and the second fire ===
World War I and Prohibition diminished the property's popularity, until September 1923 when the Hot Wells property was bought by Christian Scientists and the hotel was converted into the El Dorado School. The hotel building, serving as the school's dormitory, burned down on January 17, 1925, in less than an hour. The Bath House was saved from the flames by the Fire Department pumping river water on the covered passage from the hotel.

=== Camping park, tourist cottages and The Flame Room ===
Charles Dubose, John C. Kirkwood and M.H. Braden established the Hot Wells Tourist Park Company in December 1927 with the intention of converting the property into camping and park space with tourist cottages and a tourist park hotel. W.W. McAllister bought their company in 1929, leasing it on December 5, 1930, for three years to T. M. Leyland and S.M. Biddison for purposes of a bath house/sanitarium business while the tourist park continued to operate. McAllister sold the 21 acre property in 1942 to Mrs. Cleo S. Jones; she and her husband made of it a motel and trailer park. They re-opened two years later and the lobby of the bathhouse had become a bar and grill called The Flame Room. Cleo Jones inherited the property in 1961 upon his wife's death; he and his second wife kept The Flame Room open until 1977. In August of that same year, old bathhouse items were auctioned. A section of the charred hotel remained visible and one swimming pool was still in use for recreation and recuperation purposes, but by the mid-1970s permanent trailer park residents were few and most of the tourist cabins were vacant. Jones put the property on the market for $500,000. It was sold in December 1979 to Kathryn Scheer who hoped to open a holistic health center called Restoration Center. Ford, Powell and Carson, Inc, was the architectural team hired for the restoration of the bathhouse and three pools and the construction of a hotel to be operated by an international leader in the health and beauty facilities. She wanted Hot Wells to be a stop on the Mission Parkway System. These things never transpired. Instead the hotel and baths remained in ruins while a series of squatters overtook the trailer park and camp site remains degrading the property for decades.

=== Archeological study ===
An archeological study was conducted on the Hot Wells site in 1985 to determine the site's construction history by mapping the foundations of the burned hotel. The study, authored by Anne A. Fox and Lynn Highly, acknowledges that much of the research material was provided by Jonathan Paul de Vierville's personal files on the Hot Wells property and that the field investigations were conducted by a crew of five University of Texas at San Antonio Anthropology Department students from April 2–13, 1984 under the direction of Dr. Thomas R. Hester, director of the Center for Archaeological Research at the university. Recommendations emphasized consultation with the State Historic Preservation Officer for any future development plans.

=== South San Antonio renewal and Hot Wells deterioration ===
During these following decades, many South San Antonio cultural, commercial, natural and historic initiatives were undertaken and completed including the Mission Trails way-finding efforts and the Mission Reach of the San Antonio River Improvements project which linked hikers, bikers, birders and drivers—residents and tourists alike—to the downtown Alamo (Misión San Antonio de Valero) and the four other Spanish Colonial Missions further south which now collectively comprise the San Antonio Missions World Heritage Site. The arrival of the Toyota manufacturing plant, the Mitchell Lake Audubon Center, and commercial development around Brooks City Base (a former U.S. Air Force facility) evidence the impact of Southside San Antonio nature-based tourism and industrial growth in the greater vicinity of the Hot Wells site. In the meantime, Hot Wells fell into deeper disrepair experiencing two more fires, in 1988 and 1997, resulting in ruins.

=== Lifshutz revitalizes Hot Wells ===
In 1999, San Antonio real estate investor, James G. Lifshutz, purchased the Hot Wells property and surrounding land to preserve the story of the ruins and deliver that history back to the public. Between 1999 and 2012, Lifshutz engaged in a planning process for the property including an attempt to plug the deteriorated and non-compliant well at the request of the Edwards Aquifer Authority. Lifshutz made multiple attempts over many years but the well continued to run. During this time, too, Lifshutz performed triage on the ruin, shoring up what could be shored, removing dangerous elements that could not be saved, and restoring the North Wing which, although it had suffered extensive damage from previous fires and neglect, was ultimately salvageable. Lifshutz installed structural steel, reframed the roof gable, repointed the brick, and repaired much of the damaged brick elements.

In 2012, Lifshutz approached Bexar County Judge Nelson Wolff and County Commissioner's Court with a plan to preserve this South Side resource as a ruin, and interpret it historically. With the leadership and support of Judge Wolff, Lifshutz donated the ruin and nearly four acres of land to Bexar County. Lifshutz' donation to Bexar County of the 3.92 historical center of the property underwent a protracted deed transfer process to accommodate the remediation the sulphur well in compliance with the Edwards Aquifer Authority requirement. In 2013, the 120-year-old artesian well was permanently plugged by the Edwards Aquifer Authority.

All other impediments were resolved by 2015 when the ruins were officially deeded to the county. In October 2015, Bexar County allocated $4 million funding the first phase of the nearly four-acre park. The County went on to stabilize, landscape, and light the former hotel and bath house. The Bexar County Hot Wells Historic Park, Bexar County's first-ever cultural historical park, opened on April 30, 2019 allowing visitors to safely explore the reinforced ruins of the former Hot Wells Hotel and Spa. At the ribbon cutting ceremony to open the park, a new well was in the process of being drilled on adjacent acreage still owned by Lifshutz. C&C drilling, a firm that Lifshutz and the Edwards Aquifer Authority engaged to help plug the historic well, drilled a new permitted and compliant well.

Lifshutz continues to work with Bexar County and other entities to realize the long envisioned public/private effort to bring back the historic Hot Wells activities of wellness, dining, and lodging. Lifshutz's vision for this adjacent acreage includes the development of the Hot Wells Interpretive Center, sulfur water soaking baths, a food truck park and beer garden, with campsites and cabins.

== Hot Wells Conservancy ==
In 2013, the Hot Wells Conservancy was established by Lifshutz with Cindy Taylor, a former president of the South San Antonio Chamber of Commerce, as its charter executive director. The nonprofit exists to raise funds for the park, to connect the park with the community, the city and the county by fostering tourism to the site. Among its recurring events are Reels at the Ruin which projects silent movies onto the side of the Hot Wells Hotel ruins in homage to Hot Wells' Hollywood connections, and the Hot Wells Harvest Feast. The Hot Wells Harvest Feast was created for the Conservancy in 2013 by San Antonio artist Justin Parr, owner of the Flight Gallery in the Blue Star Arts Complex and caretaker of Hot Wells since Lifshutz took ownership of the property. First a multi-course dinner using foods grown on site, the Feast now aims to contribute to San Antonio's cosmopolitan culinary heritage. Parr says, “In the same way that Artpace brings international artists to San Antonio and exposes them to the local community, we want to do that with the culinary scene."

== Popular culture ==
Sarah Bird's Texas Quartet Book 3, The Mommy Club (Ballantine Books, 2003; first published 1991), has pages describing the rundown character of late-1980s Hot Wells Hotel ruins and remaining trailer park residents.

Poet Naomi Shihab Nye produced a short promotional film with her son about Hot Wells.

Portions of the film Rolling Thunder (1977), were reportedly filmed at Hot Wells.

The Immortal Alamo, also known as Fall of the Alamo, a ten-minute silent movie produced by the Star Film Company, was shot in the vicinity of Hot Wells with around one hundred Peacock Military Academy cadets as extras. It was released on May 25, 1911, making it the earliest filmic portrayal of the 1836 battle.
