= Brooks Creek =

Brooks Creek may refer to:

- Brooks Creek (Indiana), a stream in Indiana
- Brooks Creek (Missouri), a stream in Missouri
- Brooks Creek (Haw River tributary), a stream in North Carolina
