= Brookes =

Brookes is an English surname. Notable people with the surname include:

- Barbara Brookes, New Zealand historian
- Bruno Brookes, English broadcaster
- Dennis Brookes, English cricketer
- Ed Brookes (1881–1958), Irish football player
- Eric Brookes (1894–1918), British pilot
- Faye Brookes (born 1987), British actress
- Jacqueline Brookes (1930–2013), American actress
- James Brooks (bishop) or Brookes, English bishop
- James Hall Brookes, American Presbyterian writer
- John Henry Brookes (1891–1975), English craftsman, educator, administrator; namesake of Oxford Brookes University
- Josh Brookes (born 1983), Australian motorcycle racer
- Joshua Brookes (divine) (1754–1821), English divine and book collector
- Joshua Brookes (1761–1833), English anatomist and zoologist
- Mabel Brookes (1890–1975), Australian community worker, socialite and writer
- Norman Brookes (1877–1968), Australian tennis player
- Richard Brookes (fl. 1750), English physician and writer
- Stan Brookes (1953–2025), English footballer
- Susan Brookes (born 1943), English television chef
- Warwick Brookes (1875–1935), English businessman, yachtsman and politician
- William Penny Brookes (1809–1895), English physician and "Father of the modern Olympics"

== See also ==
- Oxford Brookes University
- Brooks (surname)
- Brooks (disambiguation)
- Brooke (disambiguation)
