= The Brook =

The Brook can refer to:

- The Brook, poem by Lord Alfred Tennyson
- The Brook (New York City), private club in New York City
- The Brook, Nelson, a suburb of Nelson, New Zealand
- The Brook, a nickname for Carisbrook, a former sports venue in Dunedin, New Zealand
- The Brook, formerly Seabrook Greyhound Park, a casino in Seabrook, New Hampshire
- The Brook, Chatham, a road in Chatham, Kent, England, built over a culverted stream
- The Brook Theatre, a performing arts venue in Chatham, Kent, England
- The Brook Brothers, an English pop duo formed in the late 1950s
- The Brook Farm Institute Of Agriculture And Education, a 19th‑century utopian communal living experiment near West Roxbury, Massachusetts
- The Brook (The Joy Formidable song), a 2016 single by Welsh alternative rock band The Joy Formidable
- The Brook Street Mystery, a 1972 Sherlock Holmes pastiche by Josh Pachter
- The Brook Street Band, a British baroque ensemble formed in 1997
- The Brook Lee Catastrophe, an American folk‑rock band from Long Beach, California, founded in 2005.
- The Brook Green Suite, a three‑movement string orchestra work composed in 1933 by Gustav Holst for St Paul’s Girls’ School junior ensemble
- The Brook, an 1876 theatrical work by Nate Salsbury

== See also ==
- Brook (disambiguation)
