= Brooke Smith =

Brooke Smith may refer to:

- Brooke Smith (actress) (born 1967), American actress
- Brooke Smith (basketball) (born 1984), American basketball player
- Brooke Smith (footballer) (born 2004), Australian rules footballer
- Brooke Smith, Houston, a historic neighborhood in Houston, Texas
- Brookesmith, Texas, an unincorporated community in Brown County, Texas
- Luke Brooke-Smith (born 2008), New Zealand footballer
- Mackenzie Brooke Smith (born 2001), American actress

== See also ==
- Brooke Howard-Smith (born 1972), New Zealand broadcaster
