= Mossman =

Mossman may refer to:

== Places ==
- Mossman, Queensland, Australia
  - Mossman Central Mill
- Mossman Gorge, Queensland
- Mossman River, Queensland
- Mossman Inlet, Antarctica
- Mossman Peninsula, Antarctica

== People ==
- Mossman (surname)

== Other uses ==
- Mossman Collection, a collection of horse-drawn vehicles in the UK
- Mossman v. Higginson, an 1800 United States Supreme Court decision

== See also ==
- Mosman (disambiguation)
