= Brooks (given name) =

Brooks is a masculine given name, though it is occasionally used as a feminine name. More commonly, it is also a surname. It may refer to:

- Brooks Atkinson (1894–1984), American theater critic
- Brooks Barnhizer (born 2002), American basketball player
- Brooks Bollinger (born 1979), American football player
- Brooks Bowman (1913–1937), American composer
- Brooks Conrad (born 1980), American baseball player
- Brooks Cryder (born 1955), American soccer player
- Brooks Dodge (1929–2018), American alpine skier
- Brooks Douglass (1963–2020), American film producer, actor, politician, and lawyer
- Brooks Foster (born 1986), American football player
- Brooks Gray (born 1975), Canadian actor and film producer
- Brooks Hansen, American author and illustrator
- Brooks Haxton (born 1950), American poet and translator
- Brooks Hays (1898–1981), American politician and religious leader
- Brooks Headley, American musician and chef
- Brooks Holder (1914–1986), American baseball player
- Bubba Jennings, American basketball player and coach
- Brooks Johnson (born 1934), American sprinter and track coach
- Brooks A. Keel, American university president
- Brooks Kerr (1951–2018), American jazz pianist
- Brooks Kieschnick (born 1972), American baseball player
- Brooks Koepka (born 1990), American golfer
- Brooks Kriske (born 1994), American professional baseball player
- Brooks Laich (born 1983), Canadian ice hockey player
- Brooks Landgraf (born 1981), American politician
- Brooks Lee (born 2001), American baseball player
- Brooks Macek (born 1992), German-Canadian ice hockey player
- Brooks McCormick (1917–2006), American businessman and philanthropist
- Brooks Mileson (1947–2008), English businessman and philanthropist
- Brooks Moore, Canadian voice actor
- Brooks K. Mould, American music publisher
- Brooks Nader (born 1997), American model
- Brooks Newmark (born 1958), American-born English member of parliament
- Brooks Orpik (born 1980), American ice hockey player
- Brooks Otis (1908–1977), American classical scholar
- Brooks Pate, American chemist
- Brooks Pennington Jr. (1925–1996), American businessman, politician, and philanthropist
- Brooks Pounders (born 1990), American professional baseball player
- Brooks Reed (born 1987), American football player
- Brooks Robinson (1937–2023), American baseball player
- Brooks D. Simpson (born 1957), American historian
- Brooks Stevens (1911–1995), American industrial designer
- Brooks Thompson (1970–2016), American basketball player and coach
- Brooks Wackerman (born 1977), American rock drummer
- Brooks Wheelan (born 1986), American comedian and actor
- Brooks Williams (born 1958), American folk musician
- Brooks D. Williams (born 1978), American women's basketball coach
- A. Brooks Harris (born 1935), American physicist
- D. Brooks Smith (born 1951), U.S. federal judge
- E. Brooks Holifield (born 1942), American religious historian
- G. Brooks Earnest (1902–1992), American college president
- L. Brooks Leavitt (1878–1941), American financier and antiquarian
- L. Brooks Patterson (1939–2019), American lawyer and politician

== See also ==
- Brooksie, a list of people and fictional characters with the nickname
