= Tham Mae Lana =

Cave in Mae Hong Son province, Thailand

- Mae Lana Cave
- Interactive map of Tham Mae Lana
- Location: Mae Lana, Pang Mapha District, Mae Hong Son Province
- Coordinates: 19.5746°N 98.2159°E
- Length: 12,720 m
- Discovery: 1986-92

Tham Mae Lana (Thai: ถ้ำแม่ละนา) is a karst cave located in Mae Lana, Pang Mapha District, Mae Hong Son Province, Thailand. It is abundant in stalactites, and is home to a subterranean stream that is populated by cavefish, including the waterfall climbing cave fish. The cave is difficult to traverse and can only be accessed with the assistance of local guides.

== See also ==
- List of caves
- Speleology
