= Brooke =

Brooke may refer to:

== People ==
- Brooke (given name)
- Brooke (surname)

== Places ==
- Brooke, Norfolk, England
- Brooke, Rutland, England
- Brooke, Virginia, US
- Brooke's Point, Palawan, Philippines
- Fort Brooke, NO

== Other ==
- Brooke Army Medical Center, Fort Sam Houston, Texas, US
- Brooke (VRE station)
- Brooke Bond, a tea company
- Brooke rifle, an American Civil War coast defense gun

== See also ==
- Brookes
- Justice Brooke (disambiguation)
