= Lindsay Adler =

American photographer

Lindsay Adler is an American portrait and fashion photographer based out of Manhattan, New York. Her editorials have appeared in Bullett Magazine, Zink Magazine and Fault. She has contributed to photo publications Professional Photographer, Rangefinder Magazine, and Popular Photography. In 2020, Adler became the first woman to win the Rangefinder Icon of the Year award.

In May 2010 Adler published her first book, A Linked Photographers' Guide to Online Marketing and Social Media. Her second book, Fashion Flair for Portrait and Wedding Photography, was named one of Amazon.com's Best Books of 2011 in Arts & Photography.

Adler also speaks and teaches within the photographic community. She was scheduled to speak in 33 cities in 2015, on her educational tour, Body Beautiful. She has been a contributor on CreativeLIVE and Kelby Training. She is also the co-host of The Framed Network's series "The Concept" (a series of shows on YouTube) with fine art photographer Brooke Shaden.

Adler was named a Canon Explorer of Light, Profoto Legend of Light and the Rangefinder Icon of the Year 2020.

== Publications ==
- A Linked Photographers' Guide to Online Marketing and Social Media, 2010
- Fashion Flair for Portrait and Wedding Photography. Cengage Learning PTR, 2011
- Shooting in Sh*tty Light: The Top Ten Worst Photography Lighting Situations and How to Conquer Them. Peachpit Press, 2012
- Designing an Image DVD series. Self-published, 2013
- Creative 52: Weekly Projects to Invigorate Your Photography Portfolio. Peachpit Press, 2013
- The Photographer's Guide to Posing. Rocky Nook, 2017

== Sources ==
- Top 20 Young Photographers 2012
