= Brooke E. Flammang =

American biologist

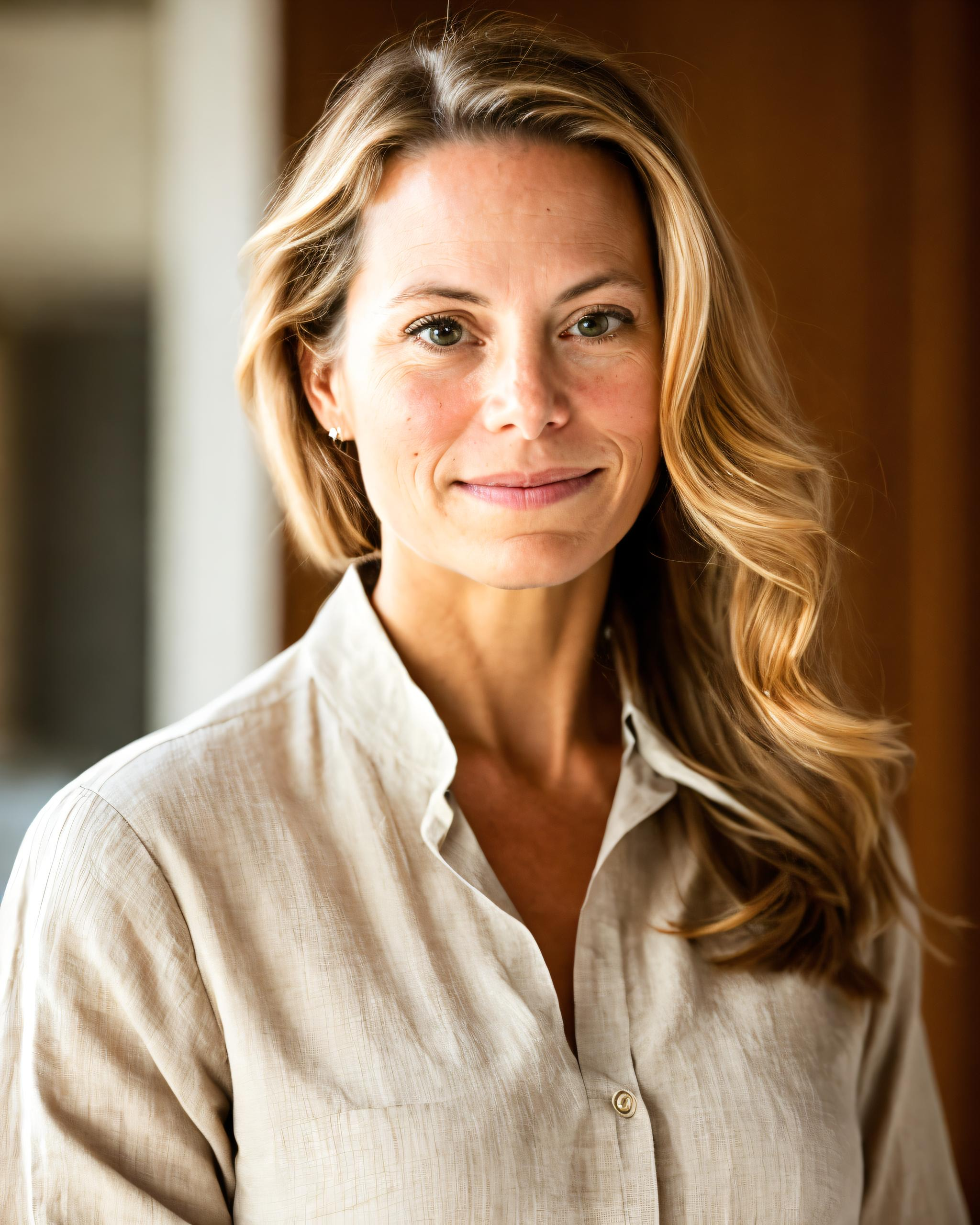
- Flammang, 2023
- Born: Brooke Elizabeth Flammang; Bridgeport, Connecticut
- Education: California State University, Monterey Bay; Harvard University
- Known for: Work on fish Morphology; Kinematics; Fluid dynamics; Bio-inspired robotics
- Scientific career
- Fields: Biology; Evolutionary Biology; Comparative Biomechanics
- Workplaces: New Jersey Institute of Technology; Princeton University; Harvard University

Brooke E. Flammang is an American biologist at the New Jersey Institute of Technology. She specializes in functional morphology, biomechanics, and bioinspired technology of fishes. Flammang is a discoverer of the radialis muscle in shark tails. She also studies the adhesive disc of the remora, and the walking cavefish, Cryptotora thamicola. Her work has been profiled by major news outlets including The New York Times, The Washington Post, Wired, BBC Radio 5, Discovery Channel, and National Geographic Wild. She was named one of the "best shark scientists to follow" by Scientific American in 2014.

== Education ==
Flammang received her Ph.D. in Biology and a postdoctoral fellowship at Harvard University, where she worked with George V. Lauder on a variety of projects, such as fluid dynamics and volumetric imaging of fish locomotion, bioinspired robotics, and bluegill sunfish and shark functional morphology and locomotion.

== Academic career ==
Flammang was a postdoctoral research fellow in the Department of Organismic and Evolutionary Biology (2010–2013) and a faculty member in the Division of Continuing Education (2009–2014) at Harvard University. She is now a Professor in the Federated Department of Biological Sciences at the New Jersey Institute of Technology. Flammang also holds appointments as a Harvard University Museum of Comparative Zoology Associate of Ichthyology, as a Visiting Researcher at Princeton University in the Department of Mechanical and Aerospace Engineering, as a Senior Fellow at the Naval Undersea Warfare Center, and as a graduate faculty member at Rutgers University.

== Research ==
Flammang's research uses integrative approaches to address the physical basis of behavior in an evolutionary comparative context, investigating the ways in which organisms interact with their environment and drive the evolutionary selection of morphology and function. By combining research expertise in ecology, evolutionary biology, comparative anatomy and physiology, biomechanics, hydrodynamics, and biologically-inspired robotics, she approaches broad-impact evolutionary questions from an experimental perspective and directly tests the relationship between an organism and its environment, ultimately leading to the development of new technologies useful in ecological and organismal monitoring.

Her research includes the remora adhesive disc, from describing its function and morphology to understanding the hydrodynamics and mechanism of its attachment, flying fishes, shark swimming biomechanics and hydrodynamics, and the walking cavefish, Cryptotora thamicola, to understand the unique morphological adaptations that may have occurred during the evolution of terrestrial locomotion. Her work has been profiled by the New York Times, the Washington Post, Wired, You're the Expert radio show, BBC Radio 5, CBC Radio, Discovery Channel, and National Geographic Wild She was named one of the "best shark scientists to follow" by Scientific American in 2014.

She has made advances to the use of 3D Particle Image Velocimetry for understanding the fluid dynamics of locomotion in fish. Her lab focuses on functional morphology and comparative biomechanics, along with bioinspired robotics, evolutionary adaptations, and the fluid dynamics of swimming.

== Most cited papers ==
- Esposito C. J., Tangorra J. L., Flammang B. E., Lauder G. V. (2012), A robotic fish caudal fin: effects of stiffness and motor program on locomotor performance. Journal of Experimental Biologyl 215:56 LP – 67. According to Google Scholar, this paper has been cited 270 times.
- Flammang BE, Lauder GV. Caudal fin shape modulation and control during acceleration, braking and backing maneuvers in bluegill sunfish, Lepomis macrochirus. Journal of Experimental Biology. 2009 Jan 15;212(2):277-86. According to Google Scholar, this paper has been cited 142 times.
- Flammang B. E., Lauder G. V., Troolin D. R. and Strand T. E. (2011), Volumetric imaging of fish locomotion. 7. Biology Letters doi.org/10.1098/rsbl.2011.0282 According to Google Scholar, this paper has been cited 111 times.
- Flammang BE, Lauder GV. Speed-dependent intrinsic caudal muscle recruitment during steady swimming in bluegill sunfish, Lepomis macrochirus. Journal of Experimental Biology. 2008 Feb 15;211(4):587-98. According to Google Scholar, this paper has been cited 116 times.
- Flammang, B. E. (2010), Functional morphology of the radialis muscle in shark tails. Journal of Morphology., 271: 340–352. doi:10.1002/jmor.10801
- Flammang B. E., Suvarnaraksha A, Markiewicz J, Soares D. (2016), Tetrapod-like pelvic girdle in a walking cavefish. Science Reports 6:23711. This paper demonstrated how Cryptotora thamicola walks and climbs waterfalls with a tetrapodal gait and has a pelvic girdle with morphological features consistent with terrestrial vertebrates.

== Awards ==
Flammang has been recognized by the Journal of Experimental Biology as an Early Career Researcher of note, and was awarded the Dorothy M. Skinner Award in 2013 by the Society for Integrative and Comparative Biology. In 2017, she was awarded the Carl Gans Award by the Society for Integrative and Comparative Biology. In 2018, she was recognized as Early Career Researcher by the Journal of Experimental Biology. She was the 2019 recipient of the Bioinspiration and Biomimetics Steven Vogel Young Investigator Award.
