= Brook =

Brook may refer to:

== Computing ==
- Brook (programming), a programming language for GPU programming based on C, and its implementation BrookGPU
- Brook+, an explicit data-parallel C compiler

== People ==
- Brook (surname)
- People with the given name Brook, or nickname
  - Brook Benton (1931–1988), American singer and songwriter
  - Brook Emery (born 1949), Australian poet, educator, and surf lifesaver
  - Brook Hannah (1874–1961), Australian rules footballer and missionary
  - Brook Mahealani Lee (born 1971), former Miss USA and Miss Universe (1997) from Hawaii, U.S.
  - Brook Lopez, American basketball player
  - Brook Taylor (1685–1731), English mathematician of Taylor series fame

== Places ==
- Brook, Indiana, United States
- Brook, Isle of Wight, England
- Brook, Kent, England
- Brook, New Forest, a hamlet in Hampshire, England
- Brook, Surrey, England
- Brook, Guildford, a hamlet in the parish of Albury, Surrey, England
- Brook Islands National Park, Australia
- Brook House Immigration Removal Centre, a detention centre near Gatwick Airport, England

== Other uses ==
- Brook (One Piece), a fictional skeleton from the anime and manga One Piece
- Brook (stream), a small natural stream, generally smaller and shallower than a creek
- Brook Advisory Centres, a British contraceptive services organisation

== See also ==
- Brock (disambiguation)
- Brock (surname)
- Brooke (disambiguation)
- Brooks (disambiguation)
- Bruck (disambiguation)
- The Brook (disambiguation)
