= Mosman (disambiguation) =

Mosman, is a suburb on Sydney's Lower North Shore in New South Wales, Australia.

Mosman may also refer to:

== People ==
- Archibald Mosman, Scottish-born merchant, grazier and whaler in Australia
- Frans Mosman (1904–1994), Dutch olympic fencer
- Hugh Mosman (1843–1909), Australian mine owner and politician
- James Mosman (died 1573), Scottish goldsmith
- John Mosman (apothecary), Scottish servant of James IV and Margaret Tudor
- John Mosman (goldsmith), maker of the Scottish crown
- Jupiter Mosman, Aboriginal Australian prospector
- Kevin Mosman, Australian rugby league footballer
- Melzar Hunt Mosman, American sculptor
- Michael W. Mosman (born 1956), American jurist
- Tony Bernard Mosman, American artist

== Other ==
- Mosman Art Prize, an annual award in Australia
- Mosman Bay, a bay of Sydney Harbour near Mosman, Australia
- Mosman Council, a local government area in Sydney
- Mosman House, in Fort Collins, Colorado, USA
- Mosman Park, Western Australia, a town

== See also ==
- Mossman (disambiguation)
