= Carlisle buried baby case =

2017 incident in Ohio, United States

On May 7, 2017, 18-year-old Brooke Skylar Richardson gave birth at home and buried her newborn daughter in the backyard of her parents' house in Carlisle, Ohio. Two months later, she described what had happened to her doctor, who reported the incident to police. Richardson was acquitted of charges of aggravated murder, child endangerment and involuntary manslaughter. She was found guilty of abuse of a corpse and received three years probation, which was ended early by the court.

The case was profiled on a number of television programs including 48 Hours and Killer Cases.

== Brooke Skylar Richardson ==
Brooke Skylar Richardson
- Born: March 9, 1999 (age 27); Ohio
- Known for: Burying her newborn daughter in her parents' backyard in 2017.
- Conviction: Abuse of a corpse

=== Personal life ===
Richardson is from Carlisle, Ohio, where she attended high school and was a varsity cheerleader. She is the daughter of Kim and Scott Richardson, and has a younger brother. She developed anorexia nervosa and bulimia nervosa as a 12-year-old and was diagnosed with body dysmorphia. She has post-traumatic stress disorder (PTSD) and depression.

=== Pregnancy and birth ===
On April 26, 2017, Richardson, a high-school senior, learned at a gynecologist appointment that she was pregnant and in her third trimester. Richardson kept her pregnancy a secret from her friends and family. Two days after attending her senior prom on May 5, 2017, Richardson gave birth to a girl in the bathroom of her parents' house. She named the girl Annabelle before burying her in her parents' backyard.

At another visit to the gynecologist, Richardson admitted to having given birth and burying the baby in the backyard.

== Investigation ==
On July 14, 2017, the skeletal remains of an infant were exhumed from the backyard of the home of Richardson's parents. Following an autopsy, forensic anthropologist Dr. Elizabeth Murray determined that the baby's bones were partially charred and died of homicidal violence. Murray retracted the assertion that the baby's bones had been charred before Richardson's trial.

In a recorded interview by police, Richardson agreed with an investigator's suggestion that she tried to cremate the baby. When visited by her parents, Richardson reiterated her statement that she had attempted to cremate the newborn.

== Trial ==
The State of Ohio v.s. Brooke Skylar Richardson
- Court: Warren County Courthouse (Lebanon, Ohio)
- Verdict: Guilty of abuse of a corpse. Acquitted of aggravated murder, child endangerment and involuntary manslaughter.

Case history
- Subsequent action: Released early from probation in 2020.

Court membership
- Judge sitting: Donald Oda II

In a trial on September 3, 2019, Richardson pleaded not guilty to charges in Warren County, Ohio, of aggravated murder, involuntary manslaughter, gross abuse of a corpse, tampering with evidence and child endangerment. The prosecution alleged that Richardson burned her newborn child's body before burying it in the backyard of her home. The prosecution asserted that Richardson had performed an internet search of "how to get rid of a baby."

The defense argued that Richardson was subjected to an overzealous interrogation. A psychologist diagnosed Richardson with dependent personality disorder and testified that this disorder could have led her to make a false confession.

== Aftermath ==
Following the trial, Richardson attended college and worked part-time at the law firm that represented her. Her probation was terminated in 2020, nearly two years early. In 2022, Richardson won a bid to have records of her conviction sealed.

== See also ==
- Concealment of birth
- Stillbirth
- Teenage pregnancy
