= Brooke Lauren =

American actress

Brooke Lauren (born September 12, 1984) is a film and television producer, as well as an actress and photographer.

== Biography ==
Lauren was born in Buffalo, New York, was raised in Orchard Park, New York and spent a great deal of her childhood in Aspen, Colorado. She attended Full Sail University and studied directing at UCLA, during which she began her filmmaking career.

Lauren dreamt of being in the entertainment industry at an early age. She has appeared in several print ads and television commercials. In 2008 she participated in the Miss Colorado USA pageant placing "first runner up" and received the "most photogenic" award. In 2009 she placed "second runner up".

In 2010 she starred in VH1's series "Secrets of Aspen", a docu-soap which depicted the lives of an elite social circle of woman who reside Aspen, Colorado. This was the launch of her producing career. Lauren collaborated with High Noon Entertainment and Vh1's executives to develop a story and character based on her real life.

Lauren spends a great amount of time traveling the world to shoot photography. Her photography premiered in episode 103 on "Secrets of Aspen".

Currently she resides in Los Angeles, but has been known to make special social appearances in Miami Beach, New York and Aspen.

== Personal life ==
Lauren volunteers her time to provide aid to woman and children living in poverty.
