= Brooke Borel =

Science journalist, author, fact-checker

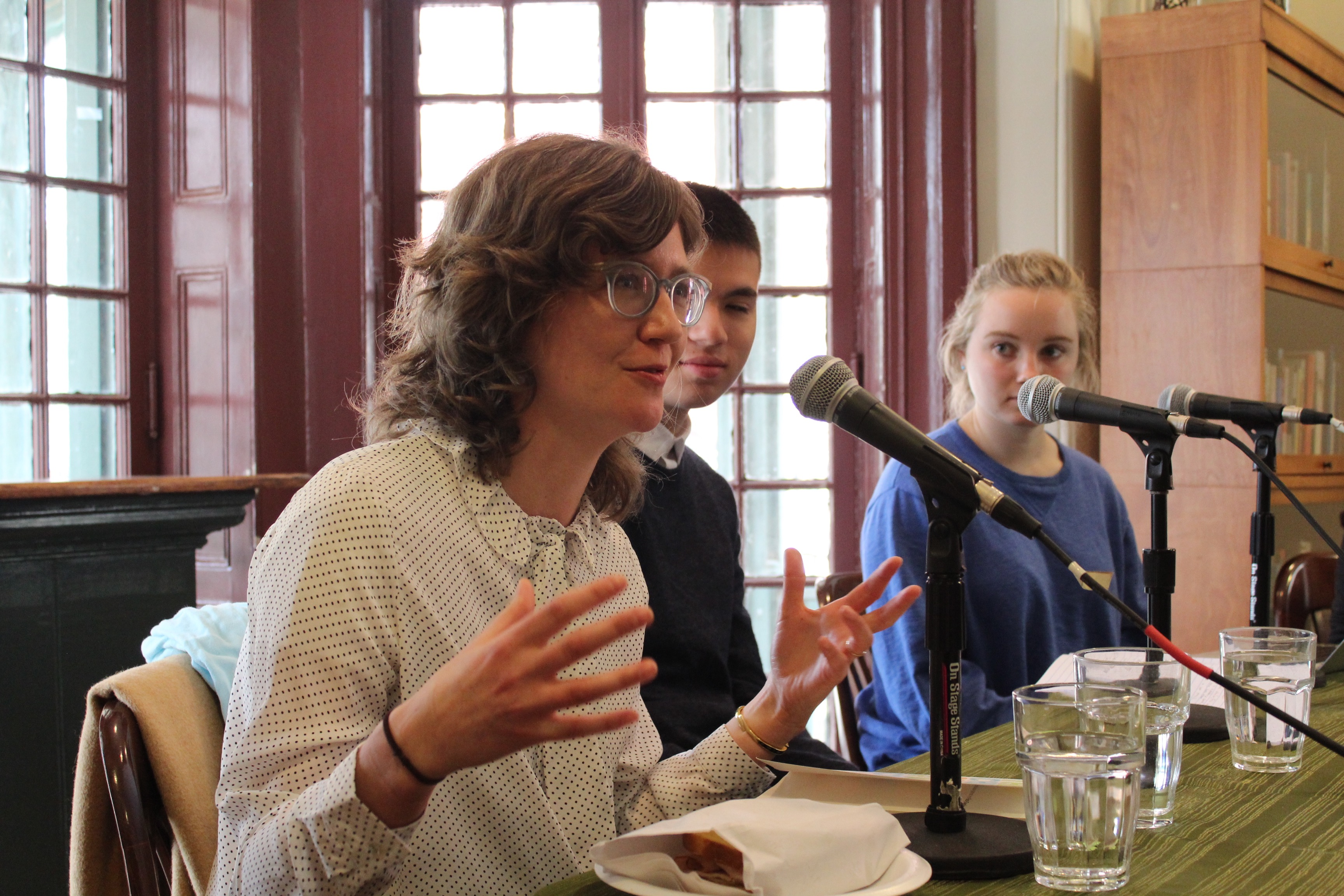
- Brooke Borel
- Born: Topeka, Kansas
- Citizenship: USA
- Education: New York University, John W. Draper Interdisciplinary Program, MA in Humanities and Social Thought, (Focus: Science Studies/History of Science/Gender Theory) 2007 Boston University, College of Engineering, BS in Biomedical Engineering, 2002
- Occupation: Science journalist
- Website: brookeborel.com

Brooke Borel is an American science journalist, scientist, and author.

Borel most famous work is Infested: How the Bed Bug Infiltrated Our Bedrooms and Took Over the World. She has also written about biotech in agriculture and pesticides used on cannabis. She became most noted for writing the history of the bed bug for Popular Science, the Atlantic, FiveThirtyEight, BuzzFeed News, The Guardian, Scientific American, and Undark Magazine.

She is a contributing editor at Popular Science and editor-at-large at Undark. The Alicia Patterson Foundation and the Alfred P. Sloan Foundation have supported her work. Brooke Borel is not only an author, journalist, and editor, but she also teaches writing workshops at the Brooklyn Brainery and New York University. Her work began after a college experience living in New York. She later decided to begin studying bed bugs.

Her list of narratives include: Popular Science, Undark, BuzzFeed, and On Earth. She also has a list of features including: Quanta, NOVA Next, and Undark. Her essays include: FiveThirtyEight, The Guardian, and Aeon Magazine. She also has magazine packages with popular science. Her infographics are shown in both Popular Science and Bicycling magazines.

Her most famous work “Infested: How the Bed Bug Infiltrated Our Bedrooms and Took Over the World” was published in 2015. The book discusses what bed bugs are, how to get rid of them, where they come from, and more introductory information.

== See also ==
- Bedbugs (musical)
- Evertune
- Nicholas A. Peppas
- Women in journalism
