= Brooke de Lench =

American filmmaker, author and journalist

- Born: February 15, 1952 (age 74); Plymouth, Massachusetts
- Occupations: Author, writer, filmmaker and young athlete safeguards and sports injury prevention advocate
- Website: de Lench's Web page

Brooke Cranston de Lench (born February 15, 1952) is an American author, filmmaker, journalist, and advocate. Her advocacy focuses predominantly on athlete safety, welfare and rights of young athletes. In 2000 she founded MomsTeam, Inc organization and in 2013 MomsTeam, Inc became a 501(c)(3) non-profit organization MomsTeam Youth Sports Safety Institute, frequently referred to as "MomsTeam". That same year she had her directorial debut with the film The Smartest Team: Making High School Football Safer, which aired on PBS. In 2015 MomsTEAM was named an Institute Pioneer Organization For U.S. Implementation of Int'l Safeguards for Children in Sport by UNICEF UK.

== Personal life ==
De Lench was born in Plymouth, Massachusetts, raised in Duxbury, Massachusetts and Stratton Mountain, Vermont. A lifelong athlete she captained her field Hockey team in high school to a Massachusetts State Championship. She currently lives in Concord, Massachusetts and is the mother of adult triplet sons.

== Career ==
De Lench has participated in awareness campaigns, initiatives, and organizations that focus on raising awareness on athlete safety, welfare and rights in youth athletes, and has been a speaker on this topic at several summits and symposia around the world.

In 2003 she launched the nonprofit organization Teams of Angels, which supports families of children that have died or been severely injured in youth sports. In 2013 she founded the MomsTeam Youth Sports Safety Institute, which raises awareness of health, nutrition and safety best practices in youth sports. De Lench serves as the organization's executive director and in 2014 she, along with MomsTeam, organized the SmartTeams Play Safe summit at the Harvard Medical School. Through the organization she has also launched a program called SmartTeams, which endorses the use of ideas and new technology that could minimize common issues with youth sports.

== Bibliography ==
- Home Team Advantage: The Critical Role of Mothers in Youth Sports (2006, Harper Collins)

== Filmography ==
- The Smartest Team: Making High School Football Safer (PBS 2013)

== Talks ==
- American Medical Society for Sports Medicine Annual Conference (AMSSM)- Youth Early Sport Specialization Summit (Houston, Texas) (April 2019)
- NYU Sports and Society: “Pressing Questions in Sports Law, Policy, Media and Science: Concussions, CTE and Conditions in Between” (New York City)(April 2018)
- International Olympic Committee's World Conference on Prevention of Injury & Illness in Sport (Monte Carlo, Monaco)(March 2017)
- Coalition for Concussion Treatment Conference at the United Nations, NYC.(January 2014)
- AYSO National Convention Keynote Dallas Keynote(April 2009)

== Published articles ==
- Brooke de Lench, & Lindsey B. Straus, Standard-Setting by Non-Governmental Agencies in the Field of Sports Safety Equipment: Promoting the Interests of Consumers or Manufacturers? 10 J. Bus. & Tech. L. 47 (2015)
