= Justice Brooke =

Justice Brooke may refer to:

- Flavius L. Brooke (1858–1921), associate justice of the Michigan Supreme Court
- Francis T. Brooke (1763–1851), associate justice of the Virginia Supreme Court
