= Brooke Cadwallader =

American textile designer (1908–1994)

Brooke Marsh Cadwallader (1 May 1908 – 21 August 1994) was an American textile designer, best known for his silk scarves, often in collaboration with his wife, Mary Pearsall Cadwallader (1899–1977).

== Early life ==
He was born in Manila, Philippines in 1908. His father was in the lumber business. In 1920 and 1930, he was living in Rockville, Connecticut with his mother Anna Grant Allen, his stepfather Charles H Allen (retired in 1920)), his elder sister Elizabeth (not in 1930), and two servants.

He was educated at Phillips Academy in Andover, followed by the Boston Museum School of Fine Arts. He taught art for three years at Phillips Academy. He studied in Paris under Andrew L'Hote, thanks to money from an interest in a gold mine, and it was there that he met his future French wife, Marie. They were producing silk scarves and fabrics, but left for the US when the German started bombing.

== Career ==
In 1941, he was living at 49 East 21st St in New York City, and was self-employed with his business at 48 West 25th Street, and his mother Mrs Charles H Allen was living at Sunset Drive, Clearwater, Florida.

In 1946, Life magazine wrote about his "highly successful combination of art and fashion" and how he had his own factory in lower Manhattan, scarves retailed at $15-20 each, with a limited edition every year, copies of which were sent to Mrs Harry Truman and Winston Churchill.

== Personal life ==
His wife Mary was born in Florence, Italy, the daughter of an Italian marchesa and an American diplomat.

He died on 21 August 1994 in New York, aged 86.

== Legacy ==
In 2025, the first new fabric in eight years with "Brooke Cadwallader" on the selvage was available at Lord & Taylor.

His work is in the permanent collection of the Metropolitan Museum of Art and the Brooklyn Museum.
