= Brooks High School =

Brooks High School may refer to:

- Brooks High School (Launceston, Tasmania), Australia
- Brooks High School (Alabama), U.S.

== See also ==
- Gwendolyn Brooks College Preparatory Academy, Chicago, Illinois, U.S.
