= Judith Mossman =

Judith Mossman may refer to:

- Judith Mossman (classicist), Professor of Classics at University of Nottingham
- Judith Mossman (Half-Life), character in the Half-Life video game series
