= Brooke Evans =

English nickel refiner

Brooke Evans (1797–1862), was well known as an English nickel refiner, weapons manufacturer and geologist.

== Early life and education ==
Evans was born in Birmingham, in 1797, his father being a woollendraper. On leaving school at the age of fifteen he was apprenticed to a gunmaker, and made his first acquaintance with metallurgy.

== Career ==
=== United States ===
His term of apprenticeship having expired, Evans started for the United States, and entered into partnership with a gunmaker in New York. He immigrated to Philadelphia, Pennsylvania and owned a hardware business that produced muskets from March 1821 to December 1823 with John Rogers. After the partnership dissolved, Rogers entered into a lone contract with the government for an additional 5,000 muskets. He was only partially successful in this trade, and before long he abandoned it, and went off prospecting in Central America.

=== Central America ===
Here he became an indigo planter, and his business capacity speedily advanced him to the position of an indigo merchant.

=== England ===
Having made some money, Evans returned to England. In the Gulf of Mexico the captain of the ship and several of the crew were seized with yellow fever. Evans took command of the ship, and navigated her successfully to the British Isles.

He afterwards purchased a small business in the glass and lead trade at Stratford-on-Avon, where he lived six years with his sister. This adventure became successful, and he saved some capital. Charles Askin, a veterinary surgeon, was a friend of Evans. He had moved to Warsaw, where some of Evans's family had ironworks. Askin there bought some spoons of a white metal called argentan by the maker. He accidentally discovered that the metal contained nickel. Askin's brother offered him the use of a laboratory in the gasworks at Leamington, of which he was the manager. There, in co-operation with Evans, he endeavoured to refine nickel from speiss (an impure mixture of cobalt, nickel, and other metals), left after the preparation of cobalt blue for painting pottery.

They were successful, and Askin joined the firm of Merry & Son, manufacturers of German silver. Askin remained a partner until he gained £1,000 by the venture, and with this he joined Evans. In 1835 they built works in Birmingham, where they successfully produced refined nickel from nickel-speiss. The demand for Evans & Askin's refined nickel and German silver increased, and the speiss produced by the cobalt blue manufacturers became insufficient for their requirements.

=== Europe ===
Evans resolved to explore Europe for the ores of nickel. He heard of its existence at the mines of Dobschan in Hungary, visited the place, and bought all the ore for which he could afford to pay. The ore contained half as much cobalt as nickel. As cobalt was detrimental to the German silver, and as Askin could not by his mode of refining separate these metals, they had to contend with a new set of difficulties. Experiments were made by Askin and Edward White Benson (the father of Archbishop Edward Benson). The demand for nickel was increasing. Evans & Askin discovered a process by which they obtained refined nickel in large quantities. To meet the demand Askin visited some nickel mines near Geisdal in Norway in 1847, where he died suddenly on 25 August. He was brought home and buried at Edgbaston. Evans then managed the business until his death.

== Death ==
He died in 1862 and was buried near his partner in Edgbaston.

== Legacy ==
The mineral evansite was named in his honour because he provided the first specimens. This mineral was brought from Hungary in the year 1855 by Evans and was then reported to be found in some abundance in brown iron ores.
