= Brooke McFarlane =

Australian cricketer (born 1973)

Personal information
- Born: 27 March 1973 (age 53)
- Batting: Right-handed
- Bowling: n/a
- Role: Opening batter

Domestic team information
- Years: Team
- 1997/98–2005/06: Victoria

Career statistics
Competition	WLA
Matches	26
Runs scored	439
Batting average	18.29
100s/50s	0/1
Top score	51
Balls bowled	18
Wickets	0
Bowling average	–
5 wickets in innings	–
10 wickets in match	–
Best bowling	–
Catches/stumpings	1/–
- Source: CricketArchive, 30 June 2021

Brooke McFarlane (born 27 March 1973) is a former Australian cricketer who is a right-handed opening batter. She played 26 List A matches for Victoria in the Women's National Cricket League (WNCL) between 1997–98 and 2005–06.
