= Karen Mossman =

Canadian virologist

- Education: University of Alberta (PhD); University of Guelph (BSc)
- Scientific career
- Workplaces: McMaster University
- Thesis: Studies of immunosuppressive poxviruses. (1996)

Karen Louise Mossman is a Canadian virologist who is a professor of Pathology and Molecular Medicine at McMaster University. Mossman looks to understand how viruses get around the defence mechanisms of cells. She was part of a team of Canadian researchers who first isolated SARS-CoV-2.

== Early life and education ==
Mossman studied molecular biology at the University of Guelph. She moved the University of Alberta for her graduate degree, where she studied poxviridae in the laboratory of Grant McFadden. She remained in the University of Alberta for the postdoctoral training, where she specialised in molecular virology with Dr. James Smiley.

== Career ==
Mossman joined McMaster University in 2001. In 2006 she was awarded the International Society for Interferon and Cytokine Research Christina Fleischmann Award. In 2021 she was recognized as one of the 100 Most Powerful Women in Canada. She served as Chair of the Department of Biochemistry from 2013 to 2017. In 2017 Mossman was named the Associate Vice President of McMaster University. From 2018 she served as Acting Vice President Research at McMaster and served as Vice President Research from 2020 to 2024. She looks to understand how viruses can elude the immune system of cells, including normal and cancer cells. She hopes to use this understanding to design novel antivirals and cancer therapies.

McMaster University has a large collections of bats, which harbour more zoonotic diseases than any other mammals. To tackle these infections, bats attempt to limit viral replication and the associated immunopathology. Mossman has studied how bats respond to disease, and identified that they have enhanced IRF3 antiviral responses. As the antiviral response of bats is considerably more active than that of humans, viruses which infect bats generate more viral proteins than typical viruses. As a result, when bat viruses infect humans cells, the immune response can be quickly overwhelmed. It was speculated that bats could serve as reservoirs of emerging coronaviruses. Mossman has studied the pathogenesis of Middle East Respiratory Syndrome.

During the COVID-19 pandemic, Mossman was part of a team of Canadian researchers who isolated the genome of SARS-CoV-2. To isolate a virus, samples are collected from infected patients, then provided an opportunity to grow in mammalian cells or on culture plates. To isolate SARS-CoV-2, Mossman and her laboratory cultured the virus on immunodeficient cells. In these cells, the virus was able to multiply at ease.

The isolated virus should allow for the development of a COVID-19 vaccine. In general, vaccinations for coronaviruses are difficult to create. As many coronaviruses exist in nature, their genetic recombination can result in the formation of novel viruses, making targets for vaccinations difficult to identify. Even when they are identified, the vaccinations can exacerbate the symptoms of disease, compromising the immune system of vaccinated patients. Like other coronaviruses, the SARS-CoV-2 that infects humans is remarkably similar to a coronavirus found in bats. In late March 2020 Mossman was funded by the Canadian Institutes of Health Research to study the pathogenesis of SARS-CoV-2 in human and bat cells, in an effort to create in vitro and in vivo models of infection. By understanding the antiviral responses of the spillover (human) and reservoir (bat) host cells, Mossman hopes to create animal models that permit the rapid testing of candidate vaccinations.

=== Selected publications ===
==== Books ====
- Mossman, Karen (2011). Viruses and interferon: current research. Wymondham. ISBN 978-1-904455-81-3.
- Mossman, Karen (2017). Innate Antiviral Immunity. Springer. ISBN 978-1-4939-7237-1.

==== Papers ====
- Kepp, Oliver; Senovilla, Laura; Vitale, Ilio; Vacchelli, Erika; Adjemian, Sandy; Agostinis, Patrizia; Apetoh, Lionel; Aranda, Fernando; Barnaba, Vincenzo; Bloy, Norma; Bracci, Laura (2014-09-02). "Consensus guidelines for the detection of immunogenic cell death". OncoImmunology. 3 (9) e955691. doi:10.4161/21624011.2014.955691. ISSN 2162-402X. PMC 4292729. PMID 25941621.
- Upton, C; Mossman, K; McFadden, G (1992-11-20). "Encoding of a homolog of the IFN-gamma receptor by myxoma virus". Science. 258 (5086): 1369–1372. Bibcode:1992Sci...258.1369U. doi:10.1126/science.1455233. ISSN 0036-8075. PMID 1455233.
- Mossman, K. L.; Macgregor, P. F.; Rozmus, J. J.; Goryachev, A. B.; Edwards, A. M.; Smiley, J. R. (2001-01-15). "Herpes Simplex Virus Triggers and Then Disarms a Host Antiviral Response". Journal of Virology. 75 (2): 750–758. doi:10.1128/jvi.75.2.750-758.2001. ISSN 0022-538X. PMC 113971. PMID 11134288.

Mossman serves on the editorial board of PLOS Pathogens, PLOS One and the Journal of Virology.
