= Brooke Miller =

Brooke Miller may refer to:

- Brooke Miller (cyclist) (born 1976), American road racing cyclist
- Brooke Miller (soccer) (born 1998), Australian soccer player
- Brooke Miller (musician) (born 1982), Canadian singer-songwriter
- Brooke Miller (born 1988), contestant on America's Next Top Model, Cycle 7
