= Brooke Davis =

Brooke Davis may refer to:

- Brooke Davis (One Tree Hill), a character on the American TV series One Tree Hill, played by Sophia Bush
- Brooke Davis (writer) (born 1980), Australian novelist
