= Brooksie =

As a nickname, Brooksie may refer to:

== People with the nickname ==
- Harry J. Brooks (1903–1928), American test pilot, so called by Henry Ford
- Louise Brooks (1906-1985), American actress
- Neil Brooks (born 1962), Australian former swimmer
- Phyllis Brooks (1915–1995), so named by Cary Grant, to whom she was rumored to have married
- Steven Brooks (lacrosse) (born 1984), American professional lacrosse player
- Brooks Orpik (born 1980), American National Hockey League player
- Larry Brooks (journalist) (born 1949/1950), American sports journalist

== Fictional characters with the nickname ==
- Claire Brooks, in the radio drama series Let George Do It (1946–1954)
- Gloria Brooks, in the short story "Delilah and the Space Rigger" by Robert A. Heinlein
