= Brooks Creek (Indiana) =

Stream in Indiana, U.S.

Coordinates: 40.3905999°N 85.0977471°W

Brooks Creek is a stream in the U.S. state of Indiana. It is a tributary to the Salamonie River.

Brooks Creek was named after John Brooks, a pioneer settler.
