= Brooks K. Mould =

American music publisher

Brooks K. Mould was a Chicago-based American music publisher, whose "Garden City Polka" was the first piece of music to be published in Chicago. He also owned a music store, and his publishing career was successful from 1847 to 1859.
