= Johnny Hernandez =

Johnny Hernandez is a chef, entrepreneur, founder and president of Grupo La Gloria and True Flavors Inc.

== Life and career ==
Johnny Hernandez was born and raised in a community of first-generation Mexican-American families. He attended the Culinary Institute of America in New York. He began his career at various resort destinations, including the Mirage Hotel & Casino in Las Vegas, Nevada, and the Four Seasons Biltmore in Santa Barbara, California. Upon returning to San Antonio in 1994, he opened his first catering concept, True Flavors Catering.

== La Gloria, Street Foods of Mexico ==
Opened in May 2010, La Gloria is situated on the grounds of the historic Pearl Brewery.

== Casa Hernán ==
The Casa Hernán opened in 2012 in San Antonio. Designed to evoke the grandeur of historic haciendas of Mérida, Mexico, Casa Hernán plays host to private events and culinary events, such as the chef's Barbacoa brunch, and has been featured in Saveur, Martha Stewart Magazine, and the Emmy-nominated program, Simply Ming.

== The Fruteria-Botanero ==
The Fruteria-Botanero opened in late 2012, in San Antonio's historic Southtown neighborhood.

== El Machito ==
In March 2014, Hernandez opened his third dining concept, El Machito, located in the former Alamo Cement Company building in San Antonio's Quarry Market. El Machito focused in mesquite grilled meats prepared in the style of the carne asadas of northern Mexico and the campestre style of Guadalajara. El Machito is now permanently closed. 2014 also saw the opening of Hernandez's molino, Tortilleria La Gloria which utilizes traditional, old world methods to produce corn products for each of his establishments, as well as other San Antonio area restaurants.

== Burgerteca ==
In November 2017, Hernandez opened his fourth dining concept, Burgerteca.

== Villa Rica ==
Adding to his group of dining and entertaining establishments, Hernandez opened his fifth dining concept, Villa Rica in February, 2018 in partnership with the Guzman family of Veracruz Mexico.
