= Brooke Shaden =

American fine art photographer (born 1987)

- Born: March 1987 (age 39); Lancaster, Pennsylvania, U.S.
- Education: Temple University
- Known for: Photography
- Website: www.brookeshaden.com

Brooke Shaden (born March 1987) is an American fine art photographer.

== Biography ==
Shaden was raised in Lancaster, Pennsylvania and graduated from Temple University with bachelor's degrees in Film and English.

She began her photography career in Los Angeles, CA creating self-portraits. Shaden is the co-host of The Framed Network's series "The Concept" (a series of shows on YouTube) with fashion photographer Lindsay Adler.

== Publications ==
- Inspiration in Photography: Training your mind to make great art a habit. Focal, 2013.

== Exhibitions ==
=== Solo exhibitions ===
- Garrett Museum Of Art, Garrett IN, 2022
- Samsara: The Artwork Of Brooke Shaden, Foothills Art Center, Golden, CO, 2022

=== Group exhibitions ===
- Digital Darkroom, The Annenberg Space for Photography. With the work of 17 artists.
