= Brooke Smith, Houston =

Neighborhood in Houston, Texas

Brooke Smith is a historic neighborhood in Houston, Texas. Founded in 1905, it encompasses approximately 1,400 homes in the 77009 ZIP code. A central part of the neighborhood is Montie Beach Park, located at the center of the community. The park is also the name for Brooke Smith's neighborhood, Montie Beach Civic Club
