= Brooke Walker =

Brooke Walker may refer to:

- Brooke Walker (cricketer) (born 1977), New Zealand cricketer
- Brooke Walker (gymnast) (born 1982), Australian gymnast
- Brooke Walker (footballer) (born 1995), Australian rules footballer
