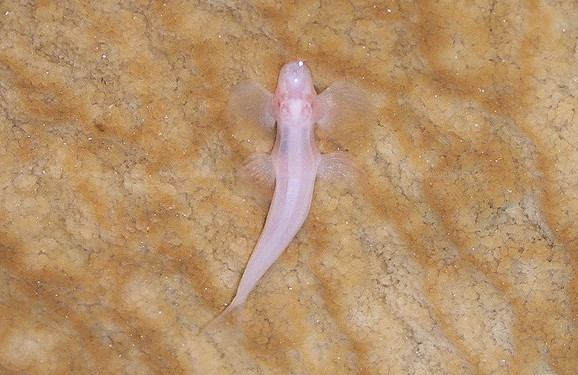

Conservation status
- Vulnerable (IUCN 3.1)

Scientific classification
- Kingdom: Animalia
- Phylum: Chordata
- Class: Actinopterygii
- Order: Cypriniformes
- Suborder: Cobitoidei
- Family: Balitoridae
- Genus: Cryptotora; Kottelat, 1998
- Species: C. thamicola

Binomial name
- Cryptotora thamicola (Kottelat, 1988)

Synonyms
- Homaloptera thamicola Kottelat, 1988

= Waterfall climbing cave fish =

Species of fish

The waterfall climbing cave fish (Cryptotora thamicola), also known as the cave angel fish, is a species of troglobitic hillstream loach endemic to Thailand. It reaches a length of 2.8 centimetres (1.1 in) SL. This fish is known for its fins, which can grapple onto terrain, and its ability to climb. In 2016 it was reported that the waterfall climbing cave fish walks with a tetrapod-like diagonal-couplets lateral sequence gait, displaying a robust pelvic girdle attached to the vertebral column.

This fish is the only known member of its genus.

The species has been recorded from eight subterranean sites within a large karst system (Pang Mapha karst formation) in Mae Hong Son Province, Thailand. The species has an extent of occurrence of nearly 200 km^{2}, but an area of occupancy of 6 km^{2}; the connectivity of this karst systems is unknown, some caves are definitely connected. The species is found in eight of the caves. It has been recorded from the Susa (from where it was first collected in May 1985) and Tham Mae Lana (Borowsky and Vidthayanon 2001). It may also occur in other submerged caves in the area. However, the species has a potential threat of agricultural pollution which could impact the whole karst system, making it one location.

Like other cavefish, it is depigmented and has no visible eyes. This species coexists with another hypogean (underground-living) loach, Schistura oedipus. The species is specialized for fast subterranean flowing water in the deeper zone of the cave (more than 500 m from the entrance). It depends on cave microorganisms and organic matter, and is very sensitive to disturbance, water quality and hydrographic change.

The species is protected under Thai law, and is found within a National Park (Pai Basin NP), but this does not necessarily protect the species as there is little restriction on agricultural practices and regulation of tourism is needed to reduce the potential impacts to the species habitat at some sites. Human disturbance from tourism activity (some of the habitat sites are popular for caving tourism and sightseeing) may threaten the species. Agriculture and deforestation are future major threats.
