= Brooks, San Antonio =

Brooks
- Neighborhood of San Antonio
- Interactive map of Brooks
- Coordinates: 29.344°N 98.444°W
- Country: United States
- State: Texas
- City: San Antonio
- Public-Private Partnership: 2001

Government
  - Mayor: Ron Nirenberg
- Time zone: UTC-6 (CST)
  - Summer (DST): UTC-5 (CDT)
- ZIP Codes: 78223 - 78235
- Area code: Area code 210
- Website: http://www.livebrooks.com

Brooks is a 1,308-acre (529 ha) community in the southeast portion of the city of San Antonio, Texas, United States. Brooks was created in 2001 by the United States Congress, the State of Texas and the City of San Antonio to redevelop the former Brooks Air Force Base. Within the context of San Antonio, Brooks is intended to be a catalyst for economic development and a model for responsible urban planning and development. Despite these goals, in the decades since its creation, Brooks has been unable to overcome the car-dependent development patterns inherited from the city of San Antonio and the State of Texas.

== Land use ==
As a centrally planned development, the Brooks land use plan is highly prescriptive in its land development and resource allocation. The plan includes specific areas designated for exclusively residential, light-industrial, health, office, commercial and retail developments.

In the typical style of suburban sprawl, Brooks's land use plan breaks the 1,308-acre campus into districts each with separate purposes. However, because none of these developments are located within close proximity to each other, Brooks has remained a highly car-dependent development, and has been unable to attract the type of mixed-use development that was initially envisioned for the community. The majority of the land in Brooks is open space, with a building coverage ratio below 20%.

There have been repeated plans attempting to create nodes of density within Brooks, notably in 2019 with the "Brooks Area Regional Center Plan", however none of these pedestrian-oriented developments have successfully been built.

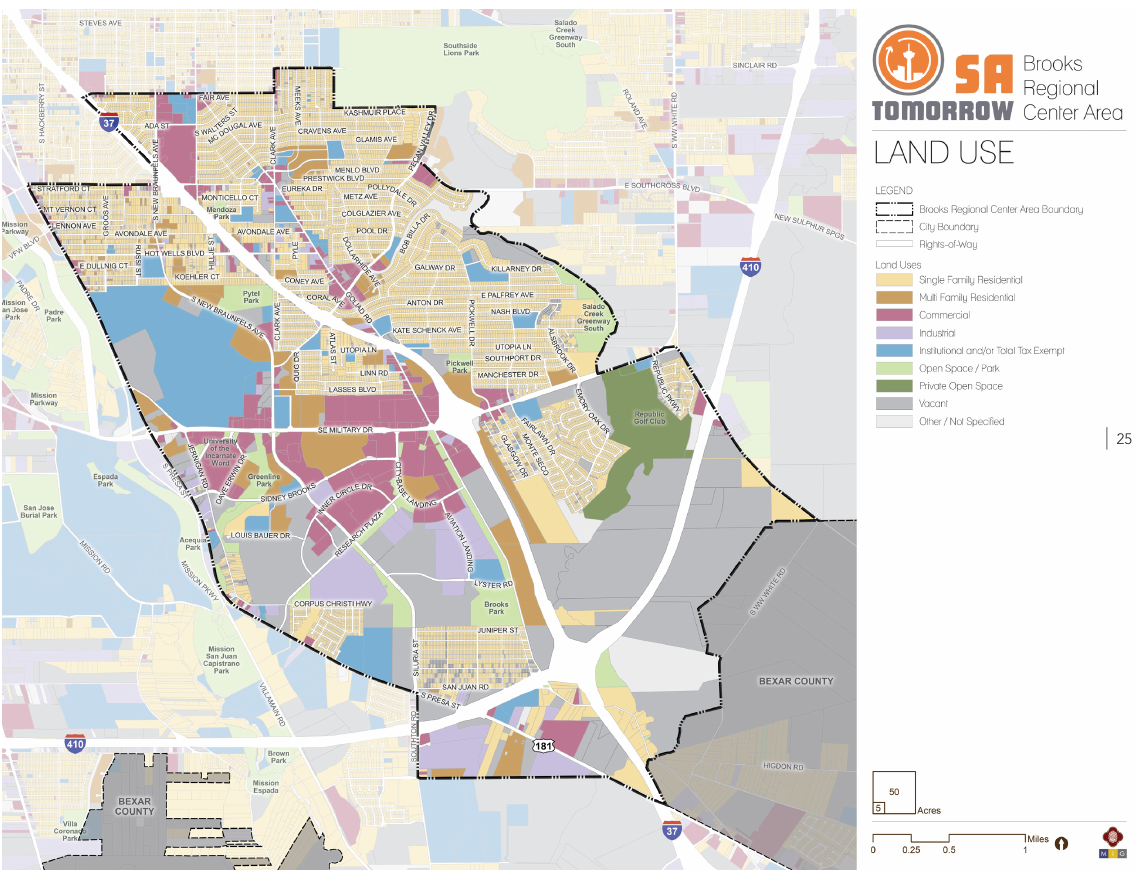

== Development ==
The Brooks Development Authority has declared economic development success with projects including a 62-acre (250,000 m^{2}) retail development, approximately 256,000 square feet (23,800 m^{2}) of research and distribution facilities for DPT Laboratories, an international pharmaceutical company, and a $25.5 million City/County emergency operations center which opened in the Fall 2007.

In 2012, the $90 million Mission Trail Baptist Hospital opened; in September 2014, Mission Solar Energy, opened a 240,000 square-foot manufacturing facility employing more than 400 people in San Antonio. The University of the Incarnate Word opened a School of Osteopathic Medicine in July 2017.

In May 2017, Embassy Suites Hotel & Spa by Hilton opened a location at Brooks, with 156-suites and about 13,000 square-feet of event and meeting space. Earlier in the year, Brooks completed their renovation of a historic airplane hangar. Hangar 9 is the oldest wooden airplane hangar in its original spot. It is now used as an event venue. The Greenline, a 43-acre linear park connecting to the San Antonio River Mission Reach, opened at Brooks in the spring of 2018.

In Spring 2018, Japanese manufacturing company, Nissei Plastics Industrial Co., Ltd. opened a $13 million plant at Brooks, providing over 50 jobs.

Three local restaurants will soon open their doors at Brooks. Chef Johnny Hernandez will open La Gloria and El Machito off of Southeast Military Drive and Kennedy Hill Drive. Chef Jeff Balfour's Southerleigh restaurant is currently under construction at the heart of The Greenline park as well as a brewery project located off of Sidney Brooks east of South New Braunfels Ave.

In Summer 2019, City Base Commons, a retail development of more than 54,000 square feet, opened on the Brooks campus. Tenants include Raising Cane's, Smoothie King, Deco Pizzeria and LA Crawfish.

== Residential ==
There are a wide range of living options at Brooks, from apartments to single-family homes.The Aviator apartments were repurposed from former Air Force barracks, while The Kennedy uses murals to commemorate President John F. Kennedy's visit to Brooks in 1963.

== Education ==
Residents are zoned to the San Antonio Independent School District or East Central Independent School District.

The community includes STEM-based K–12 school, Brooks Academy of Science and Engineering, and Compass Rose Academy, a 6-12 public charter school. Brooks also offers higher education with the University of Incarnate Word School of Osteopathic Medicine, which opened July 2017. The first class at CAST Med, a healthcare magnet high school, began in Fall 2019.

=== Historic Hangar 9 ===
Brooks started construction, in March 2016, on a rehabilitation and restoration project of the historic Hangar 9 building, built in 1918. The building is the oldest wooden aircraft hangar of its kind still standing in its original location. Hangar 9 is a San Antonio Historic Landmark, listed in the Texas State Historical Survey, the National Register of Historic Places, and is a National Historic Landmark. The $2.8 million project took approximately one year to complete. The work provided foundation and structural repairs, electrical upgrades, installation of new windows and doors, painting and siding replacement, new paving and landscaping, and accessibility improvements. The nearly 8,000 square-feet building is available for use to the public for community and business events and special gatherings.

== History ==
Brooks is a former United States Air Force facility, located in San Antonio, Texas. The Air Force ceased military operations on 30 September 2011.

Following the 1995 Base Realignment and Closure (BRAC), when Brooks AFB was removed from the BRAC list, city, state, military, and community planners began to develop a plan to privatize and approved the gradual transition in ownership of Brooks AFB from the Air Force to the Brooks Development Authority. This transition came into full effect on Jul. 22, 2002, when the Brooks Development Authority assumed control of the newly named Brooks City Base. The Air Force was the largest tenant at Brooks City Base. In 2002, Brooks Air Force Base was renamed Brooks City Base when the property was conveyed to the Brooks Development Authority as part of a unique project between local, state, and federal government. The Brooks Development Authority is now the owner and operator of the property, and is redeveloping it as a dynamic multi-use community.

In 2017, Brooks City Base changed its name to Brooks to make it clearer that it is no longer a military base.

== Namesake ==
Brooks Air Force Base was named to honor San Antonio aviator Sidney Johnson Brooks Jr. Cadet Brooks died on 13 November 1917 when his Curtiss JN-4 nosed down as he prepared to land after his final training flight at Kelly Field, Texas, possibly because he had blacked out in reaction to the inoculations they had been given shortly before the flight. Brooks was one of the first to volunteer at the call for men for the American Flying Corps; he was about to complete his training for a commission as a military aviator. He was awarded his wings and commission posthumously.

=== Names ===
- Gosport Field, prior to 5 December 1917
- Signal Corps Aviation School, Kelly Field #5, 5 December 1917
- Brooks Field, 4 February 1918
- Brooks Air Force Base, 24 June 1948
- Brooks (City-Base), 22 July 2002 – 30 September 2011
- Brooks City Base, 30 September 2011 – 1 June 2017
- Brooks, 1 June 2017 – Present
