= Brooks Creek (Missouri) =

Stream in the American state of Missouri

Brooks Creek is a stream in Iron County in the U.S. state of Missouri. It is a tributary of the Middle Fork Black River.

The stream headwaters arise just south of Missouri Route 32 southeast of the community of East End at an elevation of about 1220 feet. The stream flows to the south-southeast to its confluence with the Middle Fork near the community of Goodland.

The stream source is at 37°40′25″N 91°01′55″W and the confluence is at 37°38′09″N 91°00′08″W.

Brooks Creek has the name of the local Brooks family.

== See also ==
- List of rivers of Missouri
