= Brooke Locklear Clark =

American jurist

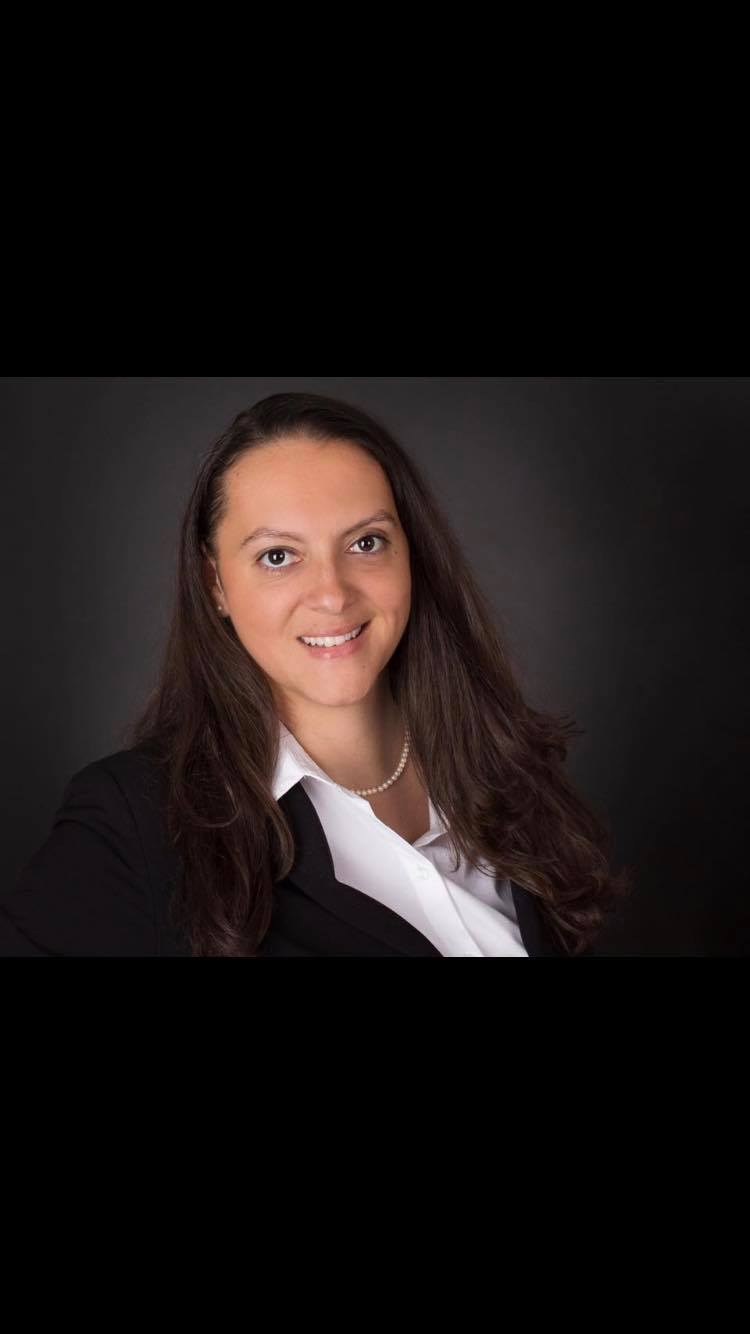

District Court Judge of Robeson County, NC
- Preceded by: Chief District Court Judge J. Stanley Carmical

Personal details
- Born: May 21, 1979 (age 47) Pembroke, NC
- Domestic partner: Adam Clark
- Children: 2
- Education: University of North Carolina at Chapel Hill

Brooke Locklear Clark (May 21, 1979 - ) is a District Court Judge for Robeson County, North Carolina since she was sworn in on August 1, 2018. Clark is a Robeson County native born in Pembroke, NC.

She was appointed by Governor Roy Cooper to fill the seat of Chief District Court Judge J. Stanley Carmical and worked to be the first American Indian woman appointed to the Robeson County District Court.

== Early life ==
Brooke Locklear Clark was born May 21, 1979, in Pembroke, North Carolina, to former Superior Court Judge Gary and Molly Locklear. She grew up as an active member of the Lumbee Tribe of North Carolina community. As a young woman Clark had wanted to pursue medicine until she encountered molecular biology, which caused her to shift to the study of anthropology.

== Education ==
In 2001, Clark graduated from the University of North Carolina at Chapel Hill with a Bachelor's Degree and continued here education here to later earn her Juris Doctor. Her experiences in undergrad led her to the legal field after multiple different networking and volunteer experiences at UNC at Chapel Hill.

== Career ==
Clark is also an active member of her community as well as a Bible Drill Leader at the Berea Baptist Church and her role with Friends of the Robeson County Public Library. In 2018, Clark announced her intent to file for the open seat as the District Court Judge in Robeson County, she was then appointed by Governor Roy Cooper later that year.

She still currently serves as the District Court Judge of Robeson County and was recently appointed to the North Carolina Task Force for Racial Equity in Criminal Justice in July 2020. She is also a part of the Family Drug Treatment Court where her experience in law helps families overcome substance abuse within the home.
