= Brooke T. Mossman =

American pathologist

Brooke T. Mossman is an American pathologist, a University Distinguished Professor emerita at the University of Vermont. She is known for her research on diseases caused by asbestos, and has been called "the world’s expert on mesothelioma".

Mossman received a master's degree in physiology and biophysics from the University of Vermont in 1970, and completed her Ph.D. in cell biology there in 1977. She continued there as a faculty member in the Department of Pathology, becoming an associate professor in 1984 and full professor in 1992. She was named as a University Distinguished Professor in 2011.
