= Asian American and Pacific Islander conservatism in the United States =

Asian Americans and Pacific Islander Americans have given fluctuating levels of support to conservative movements and political parties in the United States, particularly the Republican Party. Many Republican Party members with these origins have obtained posts as elected representatives and political appointments as office holders.

== Voting trends ==
From the 1940s to the 1990s most Asian Americans were refugees who had fled mainland China, North Korea or Vietnam, and were strongly anti–Communist. Many had ties to conservative organizations. In recent years, more liberal Asian–American groups such as newer Chinese and Indian immigrants have greatly changed the Asian–American political demographics, as well as a larger proportion of younger Asian Americans, many of whom have completed college degrees.

During the 1990s and 2000s, Asian American voting behavior shifted from moderate support for the Republican Party to stronger support for the Democratic Party. In the 1992 presidential election Republican George H. W. Bush received 55% of the Asian–American vote compared to 31% for Democrat Bill Clinton. Asian Americans voted Republican and were the only racial group more conservative than whites in the 1990s, according to surveys. By the 2004 election, Democrat John Kerry won 56% of the Asian American vote, with Chinese and Indian Americans tending to support Kerry, and Vietnamese and Filipino Americans tending to support George Bush. Japanese–Americans leaned towards Kerry, while Korean–Americans leaned towards Bush. Democrat Barack Obama won 62% of the Asian American vote in the 2008 presidential election, with the margin increasing during the 2012 presidential election, where Asian Americans voted to re-elect Obama by 73%. In the 2014 midterm elections, based on exit polls, 50% of Asian Americans voted Republican, while 49% voted Democrat; this swing towards voting for Republicans was a shift from the strong Democratic vote in 2012, and had not reached 50% since 1996. The 2016 National Asian American Survey, conducted before the 2016 presidential election, found that 55% of Asian American registered voters supported Democratic candidate Hillary Clinton and only 14% supported Republican candidate Donald Trump.

Despite their growing trend of voting for Democrats in national elections, Asian Americans have tended to identify as independents and have not developed strong ties to political parties as a group. Due to the smaller size of the groups population, in comparison to the population as a whole, it has been difficult to get an adequate sampling to forecast voter outcomes for Asian Americans. In 2008, polls indicated that 35% considered themselves non-partisan, 32% Democrats, 19% independents, and 14% Republicans. The 2012 National Asian American Survey found that 51% considered themselves non–partisan, 33% Democrats, 14% Republicans, and 2% Other; Hmong, Indian, and Korean Americans strongly identified as Democrats, and Filipino and Vietnamese Americans most strongly identified as Republicans. In 2013, according to the Asian American Legal Defense and Education Fund, Chinese Americans were the least likely Asian American ethnicity to have a party affiliation, with only one third belonging to a party. The 2016 National Asian American Survey found that 41% of Asian Americans identified as non-partisan, 41% as Democrats (a modest increase from 2008 and 2012), and 16% as Republicans.

Neither the Republican nor Democratic parties have financed significant efforts to the registration of Asian Americans, however much more attention has been focused on contributions from Asian Americans, having once been referred to as "the second most generous political donors after Jewish Americans." As recently as 2006, the outreach efforts of America's two major political parties have been unbalanced, with the Democratic Party devoting more resources in attracting Asian Americans. In 2016, a majority of Asian-Americans possessed the same political views on racial profiling, education, social security, and immigration reform as the Democratic Party; the efforts to attract Asian-Americans has produced a proportionally significant growth in Democratic affiliation by Asian-Americans from 2012 to 2016 by 12 percent. Political affiliation aside, Asian-Americans have trended to become more politically active as a whole, with 2008 seeing an increase of voter participation by 4% to a 49% voting rate. Such efforts by the Democratic Party in attracting Asian Americans came to an apex in 2020, with only Vietnamese Americans leaning mostly to the Republicans.

== Timeline of events ==
1900s

- 1903 – Jonah Kūhiō Kalanianaʻole elected as delegate to the U.S. House of Representatives from Hawaii Territory's At–large district
- 1907 - Benito Legarda elected as residential commissioner to the U.S. House of Representatives from the Insular Government of the Philippine Islands

1920s

- 1927 – Victor S. K. Houston elected as delegate to the U.S. House of Representatives from Hawaii Territory's At–large district

1930s

- 1935 – Samuel Wilder King elected as delegate to the U.S. House of Representatives from Hawaii Territory's At–large district

1950s

- 1953 – Samuel Wilder King elected as territorial governor of Hawaii
- 1956 – President Dwight Eisenhower appoints Peter Tali Coleman as governor of American Samoa
- 1959 – Hiram Fong elected a United States senator from Hawaii
  - James Kealoha elected as lieutenant governor of Hawaii

1960s

- 1969 – President Richard Nixon appoints Carlos Camacho as governor of Guam

1970s

- 1971 – Kurt Moylan elected as lieutenant governor of Guam
- 1977 – S. I. Hayakawa elected as United States Senator from California
- 1978 – Peter Tali Coleman elected as governor of American Samoa
  - Tufele Liamatua elected as lieutenant governor of American Samoa
- 1979 – Paul McDonald Calvo elected as governor of Guam
  - Joseph Franklin Ada elected as lieutenant governor of Guam

1980s

- 1981 – President Ronald Reagan appoints Wendy Lee Gramm as Head of the Commodity Futures Trading Commission
- 1982 – Pedro Tenorio elected as governor of the Northern Mariana Islands
  - Pedro Agulto Tenorio elected as lieutenant governor of the Northern Mariana Islands
- 1983 – Joseph Franklin Ada elected as governor of Guam
- 1985 – Vicente T. Blaz elected as Delegate to the U.S. House of Representatives from Guam's at–large district
- 1987 – Pat Saiki (HI) elected to U.S. Congress
  - Frank Blas elected as lieutenant governor of Guam
- 1989 – President George H. W. Bush appoints Elaine Chao as United States Deputy secretary of Transportation
  - Peter Tali Coleman elected as governor of American Samoa
    - Galea'i Peni Poumele elected as lieutenant governor of American Samoa

1990s

- 1990 – Juan Babauta elected as resident representative of the Northern Mariana Islands
  - Lorenzo I. De Leon Guerrero as governor of the Northern Mariana Islands
    - Benjamin Manglona as lieutenant governor of the Northern Mariana Islands
- 1991 – President George H. W. Bush appoints the following:
  - Elaine Chao as director of the Peace Corps
  - Pat Saiki as administrator of the Small Business Administration
  - Jan C. Ting as assistant commissioner at the Immigration and Naturalization Service
    - Cheryl Lau is elected as secretary of State of Nevada
- 1992 – Gaioi Tufele Galeai appointed as lieutenant governor of American Samoa
- 1993 – Jay Kim (CA) elected to U.S. Congress
- 1995 – John Ensign (NV) elected to U.S. Congress
  - Matt Fong elected as California State Treasurer
- 1998 – President Bill Clinton appoints Bert Mizusawa as Deputy Undersecretary of the Army for Interagency and International Affairs
  - Pedro Tenorio elected as governor of the Northern Mariana Islands
    - Jesus Sablan elected as lieutenant governor of the Northern Mariana Islands

2000s

- 2001 – President George W. Bush appoints the following:
  - Elaine Chao as United States secretary of labor
  - David S. C. Chu as under secretary of defense for personnel and readiness
  - Viet D. Dinh as United States assistant attorney general for the Office of Legal Policy
  - David Kuo as deputy director of the White House Office of Faith-Based and Neighborhood Partnerships
  - Susan Ralston as special assistant to the president
  - Victor Cha as director for Asian Affairs
  - Karan Bhatia as deputy under secretary of Commerce for Industry
  - John Quoc Duong as director of the White House Initiative on Asian Americans and Pacific Islanders
  - Chiling Tong as deputy assistant secretary of the International Trade Administration
    - John Ensign elected as United States senator from Nevada
- 2002 – Duke Aiona as lieutenant governor of Hawaii
  - Juan Babauta elected as governor of the Northern Mariana Islands
    - Pedro Agulto Tenorio elected as Resident Representative of the Northern Mariana Islands
      - Diego Benavente as lieutenant governor of the Northern Mariana Islands
- 2003 – Felix Perez Camacho elected as governor of Guam
  - Kaleo Moylan as lieutenant governor of Guam
- 2005 – Bobby Jindal (LA) elected to U.S. Congress
- 2006 – President George W. Bush appoints the following:
  - Edmund C. Moy as director of the United States Mint
  - Wan J. Kim as assistant United States attorney general for the Civil Rights Division
  - John Yoo as deputy assistant U.S. attorney general in the Office of Legal Counsel
  - Mina Nguyen as deputy assistant secretary for Business Affairs and Public Liaison
  - Angela Perez Baraquio to the President's Council on Service and Civic Participation
- 2007 – Michael Cruz elected as lieutenant governor of Guam
- 2008 – Bobby Jindal elected as governor of Louisiana
  - President George W. Bush appoints the following:
    - Sada Cumber as United states special envoy to the Organisation of Islamic Cooperation
    - Neel Kashkari as assistant secretary of the treasury for financial stability
    - Sandy Baruah as acting administrator of the Small Business Administration
    - Jessie K. Liu as deputy assistant attorney general
    - Lanhee Chen to the Social Security Advisory Board
      - James C. Ho appointed as solicitor general of Texas
- 2009 – Steve Austria (OH) and Joseph Cao (LA) are elected to U.S. Congress

2010s

- 2010 – Charles Djou (HI) elected to U.S. Congress
- 2011 – Nikki Haley elected as governor of South Carolina
  - Eddie Baza Calvo elected as governor of Guam
- 2013 – Eloy Inos elevated as governor of the Northern Mariana Islands
  - Jude Hofschneider elevated to lieutenant governor of the Northern Mariana Islands
    - Sean Reyes appointed as attorney general of Utah
- 2014 – Nandita Berry appointed as secretary of State of Texas
- 2015 – Amata Coleman Radewagen elected as delegate to the U.S. House of Representatives from American Samoa's at–large district
  - Ralph Torres elected as lieutenant governor of the Northern Mariana Islands
    - Ralph Torres elevated as governor of the Northern Mariana Islands
      - Victor Hocog elevated as lieutenant governor of the Northern Mariana Islands
        - Yumi Hogan becomes the first lady of Maryland
- 2017 – President Donald Trump appoints the following:
  - Nikki Haley as United States ambassador to the United Nations
  - Elaine Chao as United States secretary of Transportation
  - Noel Francisco as solicitor general of the United States
  - Seema Verma as administrator of the Centers for Medicare and Medicaid Services
  - Ajit Pai as chairman of the Federal Communications Commission
  - Neil Chatterjee as chairman of the Federal Energy Regulatory Commission
  - Neomi Rao as administrator of the Office of Information and Regulatory Affairs
  - Manisha Singh as assistant secretary of State for Economic and Business Affairs
  - Gopal Khanna as director of the Agency for Healthcare Research and Quality
  - Kari Bingen as principal deputy under secretary of defense for intelligence
  - Derek Kan as under secretary of transportation for policy
  - Vishal Amin as intellectual property enforcement coordinator
  - Raj Shah as White House principal deputy press secretary
  - Grace Koh as special assistant to the president (technology, telecom, and cyber–security policy)
- 2018 – President Donald Trump appoints the following:
  - Jeff Tien Han Pon as director of the United States Office of Personnel Management
  - Michelle Giuda as assistant secretary of State for Public Affairs
  - Brent K. Park as deputy administrator for Defense Nuclear Nonproliferation
  - Joyce Y. Meyer as White House deputy director of legislative affairs (House Liaison)
  - Uttam Dhillon as White House deputy counsel
    - Kimberly Yee elected as state treasurer of Arizona

2020s

- 2020 – Stephanie Bice (OK), Young Kim (CA), James Moylan (GU) and Michelle Steel (CA) elected to U.S. Congress
- 2024 - Vince Fong (CA) and Kimberlyn King-Hinds (NMI) elected to U.S. Congress
  - Pula Nikolao Pula elected as Governor of American Samoa
    - Pulu Ae Ae Jr. elected as Lieutenant Governor of American Samoa

== Politicians ==
=== Arizona ===
- Abraham Hamadeh - U.S. representative from Arizona's 8th congressional district (2025-present)
- Quang Nguyen – Arizona state representative (2021–present)
- Kimberly Yee – State Treasurer (2019–present) and Arizona state senator (2013–2019)
- Jay Tibshraeny – Arizona state senator (2003–2010)
- Barry Wong – Arizona state representative (1993–2001) and Arizona corporation commissioner (2006–2007)

=== California ===
- Eric Tung – Judge of the United States Court of Appeals for the Ninth Circuit (2025–present)
- Jay Bhattacharya – Director of the National Institutes of Health (2025–present)
- Steven Cheung – White House Communications Director (2025–present)
- Jennifer S. Korn – Deputy Assistant to the President and Faith Director of the White House Faith Office (2025–present)
- Tom Barrack – United States Ambassador to Turkey (2025–present)
- David Tangipa – California State assemblyman (2024–present)
- Vince Fong – U.S. representative from California's 20th congressional district (2024–present)
- Tri Ta – California State assemblyman (2023–present)
- Caroline Pham – Commissioner of the Commodity Futures Trading Commission (2022–2025)
- Mark Uyeda – Commissioner of the U.S. Securities and Exchange Commission (2022–present)
- Chi Charlie Nguyen – Mayor of Westminster, California (2022–present)
- Chuong Vo – Mayor of Cerritos (2022–2023)
- Michelle Steel – U.S. representative from California's 45th congressional district (2021–2025)
- Harry Sidhu – mayor of Anaheim (2018–2022)
- Tyler Diep – California State assemblyman (2018–2020)
- Karen Goh – Mayor of Bakersfield (2017–present)
- Steven Choi – California State assemblyman (2016–2023) and California state senator (2024–present)
- Phillip Chen – California State assemblyman (2016–present)
- Young Kim – U.S. representative from California's 40th congressional district (2021–present) & California State assemblywoman (2014–2016)
- Andrew Do – Orange County supervisor (2014–2024)
- Chris Cate – San Diego City Councilman (2014–2022)
- Ling Ling Chang – California State assemblywoman (2014–2016) & California state senator (2018–2021)
- Harmeet Dhillon – United States Assistant Attorney General for the Civil Rights Division (2025–2026) & Republican National Committeewoman
  from California (2016–2025)
- Lisa Bartlett – Orange County supervisor (2014–2022)
- Tani Cantil–Sakauye – Chief Justice of the California Supreme Court (2011–2023)
- Janet Nguyen – Orange County Board supervisor (2007–2014), California state senator (2014–2018), & California State assemblywoman (2020–present)
- Mike Gin – mayor of Redondo Beach (2005–2013)
- Van Tran – California State assemblyman (2004–2010)
- Betty Tom Chu – mayor of Monterey Park, California (2006–2007)
- Alan Nakanishi – California State assemblyman (2002–2008)
- Jose Esteves – mayor of Milpitas (2002–2016)
- Debra Wong Yang - United States Attorney for the Central District of California (2002-2006)
- Darrell Issa – U.S. representative from California's 48th congressional district (2001–2019, 2021–present)
- Shirley Horton – California State assemblywoman (2000–2008)
- Ming Chin – Associate Justice of the Supreme Court of California (1996–2020)
- Jay Kim – U.S. representative from California's 41st congressional district (1993–1999)
- Nao Takasugi – California State assemblyman (1992–1998)
- Eunice Sato – mayor of Long Beach (1980–1982)
- S. I. Hayakawa – U.S. Senator (1977–1983)
- Tom Hom – California State assemblyman (1970–1972)

=== Colorado ===
- Janak Joshi – Colorado state representative (2011–2017)

=== Connecticut ===
- Kimberly Fiorello – Connecticut state representative (2021–2023)
- Harry Arora – Connecticut state representative (2020–2023)
- Prasad Srinivasan – Connecticut state representative (2011–2019)
- Tony Hwang – Connecticut state representative (2009–2015) & Connecticut state senator (2015–present)

=== Florida ===
- Kash Patel – Director of the Federal Bureau of Investigation (2025–present)
- Kaylee Tuck - Florida state representative (2021–present)
- Mike Giallombardo - Florida state representative (2021–present)
- Julia Nesheiwat – United States Homeland Security Advisor (2020–2021)

=== Georgia ===
- Carla Wong McMillian – Associate Justice of the Georgia Supreme Court (2020–present)
- B. J. Pak – Georgia state representative (2011–2017) and United States attorney for the Northern District of Georgia (2017–2021)
- Soo Hong – Georgia State Representative (2023–present)
- Charlice Byrd – Georgia State Representative (2005-2013 and 2021–present)

=== Hawaii ===
- Samantha DeCorte – Hawaii state senator (2025–present)
- Garner Musashi Shimizu – Hawaii state representative (2025–present)
- Julie Reyes Oda – Hawaii state representative (2025–present)
- Chris Muraoka – Hawaii state representative (2025–present)
- Kanani Souza – Hawaii state representative (2025–present)
- Diamond Garcia – Hawaii state representative (2025–present)
- David Alcos – Hawaii state representative (2023–present)
- Brenton Awa – Hawaii state senator (2023–present)
- Kurt Fevella – Hawaii state senator (2019–present)
- Val Okimoto – Hawaii state representative (2019–2023) & Honolulu City Councilor (2023–present)
- Kenji M. Price – United States attorney for the District of Hawaii (2018–2021)
- Andria Tupola – Hawaii state representative (2015–2019) & Honolulu City Councilor (2020–present)
- Feki Pouha – Hawaii state representative (2015–2017)
- Tulsi Gabbard - Director of National Intelligence (2025–2026) and U.S. Representative from Hawaii's 2nd congressional district (2013-2021)
- Lauren Matsumoto – Hawaii state representative (2013–present)
- Beth Fukumoto – Hawaii state representative (2013–2017) (Became a Democrat in 2017)
- Richard Fale – Hawaii state representative (2013–2015)
- David S. Chang – chairman of the Hawaii Republican Party (2011–2014)
- Aaron Ling Johanson – Hawaii state representative (2010–2014) (Became a Democrat in 2014)
- Karen Awana – Hawaii state representative (2007–2014) (Became a Democrat in 2007)
- Mike Gabbard – Hawaii state senator (2007–present) (Became a Democrat in 2007)
- Kymberly Marcos Pine – Hawaii state representative (2005–2013) & Honolulu City Councilor (2013–2017) (Became a Democrat in 2017)
- Charles Kong Djou - Hawaii state representative (1999–2002), Honolulu City Councilor (2002–2010), & U.S. Representative (2010–2011)
- Lynn Finnegan – Hawaii state representative (2003–2011)
- Corinne Wei Lan Ching – Hawaii state representative (2003–2013)
- Kika Bukoski – Hawaii state representative (2001–2005)
- Guy P. Ontai – Hawaii state representative (2001–2005)
- Edward H. Kubo, Jr. – United States attorney for the District of Hawaii (2001–2009)
- Emily Auwae – Hawaii state representative (1999–2003)
- Bertha Leong – Hawaii state representative (1999–2005)
- David Pendleton – Hawaii state representative (1997–2005)
- Samson Aiona – Hawaii state representative (1997–1999)
- Quentin Kawananakoa – Hawaii state representative (1995–1999)
- Larry Tanimoto – mayor of Hawaii County (1990)
- Bernard Akana – mayor of Hawaii County (1988–1990)
- Stan Koki – Hawaii state senator (1988–1995)
- Pat Saiki – Chair of the Hawaii Republican Party (2014–2015), Administrator of the Small Business Administration (1991–1993), and U.S. representative from Hawaii's 1st congressional district (1987–1991)
- Patrick A. Ribellia – Hawaii state representative (1987) (Became a Democrat in 1987)
- Ann Kobayashi – Hawaii state senator (1981–1988) (Became a Democrat in 1988)
- Marvin S. C. Dang – Hawaii state representative (1981–1983)
- Kimo Wong – Hawaii state representative (1981–1983)
- Mike Liu – Hawaii state representative (1979–1991) & Hawaii state senator (1995–1997)
- Barbara Marumoto – Hawaii state representative (1979–2013)
- Whitney Anderson – Hawaii state representative (1978–1992) & Hawaii state senator (1995–2000)
- Tony Narvaes – Hawaii state representative (1977–1983)
- Donna Ikeda – Hawaii state representative (1975–1987) & Hawaii state senator (1987–1996) (Became a Democrat in 1988)
- Kinau Kamalli – Hawaii state representative (1975–1987)
- Dan Hakoda – Hawaii state representative (1975–1977)
- Alvin T. Amaral – Hawaii state representative (1973–1977)
- Archie Hapai III – Hawaii state representative (1973–1975)
- Patrick A. Ribellia – Hawaii state representative (1971–1974) (Became a Democrat in 1974)
- Wing Kong Chong – Hawaii state representative (1971–1975)
- Hiram Fong Jr. – Hawaii state representative (1971–1979)
- James Aki – Hawaii state representative (1971–1976) (Became a Democrat in 1976)
- Howard K. Oda – Hawaii state representative (1967–1976) (Became a Democrat in 1976)
- Tennyson Lum – Hawaii state representative (1967–1970 & 1975–1976) & Hawaii state senator (1971–1974)
- Wilfred Soares – Hawaii state representative (1967–1977) & Hawaii state senator (1971–1975)
- Andy Poepoe – Hawaii state representative (1967–1977)
- Ralph Ajifu – Hawaii state representative (1967–1979) & Hawaii state senator (1979–1985)
- Thomas K. Lalakea – Hawaii state representative (1965–1967)
- Clinton I. Shirashi – Hawaii state senator (1963–1967)
- Toshi Ansai – Hawaii state senator (1963–1971)
- Kenneth H. Nakamura – Hawaii state representative (1963–1965)
- Hiram Fong – U.S. Senator (1959–1977)
- Francis M. F. Ching – Hawaii state senator (1959–1965)
- Noboru Miyake – Hawaii state senator (1959–1967)
- Lawrence Kunihisa – Hawaii state senator (1959–1963)
- Bernard H. Tokunaga – Hawaii state senator (1959–1963)
- John T. Ushijima – Hawaii state senator (1959–1962) (Became a Democrat in 1962)
- Wadsworth Yee – Hawaii state representative (1959–1967) & Hawaii state senator (1967–1983)
- Robert K. Fukuda – Hawaii state representative (1959–1963)
- Katsugo Miho – Hawaii state representative (1959–1971)
- Percy Mirikitani – Hawaii state representative (1959–1967) & Hawaii state senator (1967–1975)
- Robert Teruya – Hawaii state representative (1959–1963)
- Peter Aduja – Hawaii territorial representative (1954-1956) & Hawaii state representative (1967–1975)
- Wilfred Tsukiyama – Hawaii territorial senator (1946–1959)
- Sanji Abe – Hawaii territorial representative (1940–1946)

=== Idaho ===
- Julie Yamamoto – Idaho state representative (2020–2024)
- Julie VanOrden – Idaho state representative (2012–2018) & – Idaho state senator (2022-present)
- Pat Takasugi – Idaho state representative (2007–2011)

=== Kansas ===
- Shanti Gandhi – Kansas state representative (2013–2015)
- Lily Wu - Mayor of Wichita, Kansas (2024-present)

=== Kentucky ===
- Amul Thapar – United States attorney for the Eastern District of Kentucky (2006–2008)
- Elaine Chao – United States Secretary of Transportation (2017–2021) and United States Secretary of Labor (2001–2009)

=== Louisiana ===
- Joseph Cao – U.S. representative from Louisiana's 2nd congressional district (2009–2011)
- Bobby Jindal – Governor of Louisiana (2008–2016) and U.S. representative from Louisiana's 1st congressional district (2005–2008)

=== Maryland ===
- Marty Makary – Commissioner of Food and Drugs (2025–2026)
- Robert Hur - United States Attorney for the District of Maryland (2018–2021)

=== Massachusetts ===
- Sabita Singh – appeals court judge for the Commonwealth of Massachusetts (2017–present)
- Dean Tran – Massachusetts state senator (2017–2021)
- Keiko Orrall – Massachusetts state representative (2011–2019)
- Donald Wong – Massachusetts state representative (2011–present)

=== Michigan ===
- Bill Bazzi – United States Ambassador to Tunisia (2025–present)
- Amer Ghalib – Mayor of Hamtramck (2022–2026)

=== Minnesota ===
- Jennifer Carnahan – Chair of the Minnesota Republican Party (2017–2021)
- Rachel Paulose – U.S. attorney for the District of Minnesota (2006–2007)

=== Missouri ===
- Jonathan Patterson – Missouri state representative (2019–present) and Speaker of the Missouri House of Representatives (2025–present)
- Vivek Malek - State Treasurer of Missouri (2023-present)

=== Nebraska ===
- Tony Fulton – Nebraska state representative (2007–2013) and Tax Commissioner of Nebraska (2016–2022)
- Lormong Lo – Omaha City Councillor (1993–2001)

=== Nevada ===
- Sigal Chattah – United States Attorney for the District of Nevada (2025–present)
- Glen Leavitt – Nevada assemblyman (2018–2022)
- Francis Allen–Palenske – Nevada assemblywoman (2004–2008) and Las Vegas City Councilwoman (2022-present)
- John Ensign – U.S. Senator (2001–2011) and U.S. representative from Nevada's 1st congressional district (1995–1999)
- Cheryl Lau – Nevada Secretary of State (1991-1995)

=== New Hampshire ===
- Lily Tang Williams – Chair of the Colorado Libertarian Party (2015–2016)
- Aboul Khan – New Hampshire state representative (2012–present)
- Saggy Tahir – New Hampshire state representative (2001–2011)

=== New Jersey ===
- Alina Habba – Senior Advisor to the Attorney General for U.S. Attorneys (2025–present) and Counselor to the President (2025)
- Alex Nelson Wong – United States Principal Deputy National Security Advisor (2025)
- Philip Kwon – Deputy Counsel for Port Authority of New York and New Jersey (2012–2018)
- David F. Bauman – New Jersey Superior Court Judge (2008–present)
- Kevin J. O'Toole – New Jersey state senator (2002–2017)

=== New York ===
- Phil Wong – Member of the New York City Council (2026–present)
- Steve Chan – New York State Senator (2025–present)
- Jeanine Pirro – United States Attorney for the District of Columbia (2025-present)
- Anil Beephan Jr. – New York State Assemblyman (2023–present)
- Lester Chang – New York State Assemblyman (2023–present)
- Peter Koo – New York City Councillor (2010–2012) (Became a Democrat in 2012)

=== Ohio ===
- Pierre Yared – Vice Chair of the Council of Economic Advisers (2025–present)
- Niraj Antani – Ohio state representative (2014–2021) & Ohio state senator (2021–2025)
- Cliff Rosenberger – Speaker of the Ohio House of Representatives (2015–2018) and Ohio state representative (2011–2018)
- Steve Austria – U.S. representative from Ohio's 7th congressional district (2009–2013)

=== Oklahoma ===
- Stephanie Bice – U.S. representative from Oklahoma's 5th congressional district (2021–present)
- Daniel Pae – Oklahoma state representative (2018–present)
- Ervin Yen – Oklahoma state senator (2014–2018)

=== Oregon ===
- Justin Hwang – Chair of the Oregon Republican Party (2022–2025)
- John Lim – Oregon state senator (1993–2001) & Oregon state representative (2005–2009)

=== Pennsylvania ===
- Mehmet Oz – Administrator of the Centers for Medicare and Medicaid Services (2025–present)
- David Oh – Philadelphia City Councillor (2012–2023)
- Dina Powell – United States Deputy National Security Advisor for Strategy (2017–2018) and Director of the White House Presidential Personnel Office (2003–2005)
- Jeff Coleman – Pennsylvania state representative (2001–2005)
- John Pippy – Pennsylvania state representative (1997–2003) & Pennsylvania state senator (2003–2012)

=== Rhode Island ===
- Allan Fung – mayor of Cranston (2009–2021); Republican nominee for governor of Rhode Island in 2014 and 2018.

=== Tennessee ===
- Michele Reneau - Tennessee state representative (2025–present)
- Sabi Kumar - Tennessee state representative (2015–present)
- Jerome Cochran – Tennessee state representative (2002–2006)

=== Texas ===
- Nicholas Ganjei – Judge of the United States District Court for the Southern District of Texas (2026–present)
- Mora Namdar – Assistant Secretary of State for Consular Affairs (2025–present)
- Massad Boulos – U.S. Senior Advisor for Arab and African Affairs (2025–present)
- Abraham George – Chairman of the Texas Republican Party (2024–2026)
- Caroline Harris Davila – Texas state representative (2023–present)
- Jacey Jetton – Texas state representative (2021–2025)
- Steve Le – Houston City Councillor (2015–2025)
- Richard Nguyen – Houston City Councillor (2013–2015)
- Christi Craddick – Railroad Commissioner of Texas (2012-present)
- Angie Chen Button – Texas state representative (2009–present)
- Al Hoang – Houston City Councillor (2009–2013)
- M.J. Khan – Houston City Councillor (2003–2009)
- Martha Wong – Texas state representative (2003–2007) & Houston City Councillor (1993–2003)
- Bala K. Srinivas – mayor of Hollywood Park (1988–1994)

=== Utah ===
- Sophia M. DiCaro – Utah state representative (2015–2017)
- Sean Reyes - Attorney General of Utah (2013–2025)
- Brian Shiozawa – Utah state senator (2013–2017)
- Dean Sanpei – Utah state representative (2010–2017)
- Curtis Oda – Utah state representative (2005–2017)

=== Virginia ===
- Hung Cao – Under Secretary of the Navy (2025–present)
- David Ramadan – Virginia State Delegate (2012–2016)
- Ron Villanueva – Virginia State Delegate (2010–2018)

=== Washington ===
- Conrad Lee – mayor of Bellevue (2012–2018)
- Mark Miloscia – Washington state Senator (2015–2019) and state representative (1999–2013)

=== Washington, D.C. ===
- Jessie K. Liu – United States attorney for the District of Columbia (2017–2020)
- Viet D. Dinh – Assistant attorney general of the United States (2001–2003)

=== West Virginia ===
- Tom Takubo – West Virginia state senator (2015–present)

=== Wyoming ===
- Daniel Singh – Wyoming state representative (2023–present)
- Nimi McConigley – Wyoming state representative (1994–1996)

== Public personalities ==
- Kristi Yamaguchi - Japanese American figure skater and author
- Kathy Zhu - Chinese American former Miss Michigan
- Emily Hu - Taiwanese American engineer and record-holding powerlifter
- Susan Li - Chinese Canadian-American journalist
- Sophia Yan - Taiwanese American classical pianist and journalist
- Kristy Tamashiro - Japanese American journalist
- Yeonmi Park - North Korean defector and conservative radio talk show host
- A.D. Amar - Indian American scholar
- Reihan Salam - Bangladeshi American journalist
- Dinesh D’Souza - Indian American commentator
- Patrick Bet-David - Iranian American businessman, media personality, author, and podcaster
- Husain Haqqani - Pakistani American diplomat
- Miles Yu - Chinese American policy advisor
- Raj Shah - Indian American White House Deputy Press Secretary
- Hsiao-ting Lin - Taiwanese historian and political scientist
- Raghuram Rajan - Indian American economist
- Ramesh Ponnuru - Indian American journalist and political pundit
- Ajit Pai - Indian American attorney
- Sadanand Dhume - Indian American writer and journalist
- John Yoo - Korean American legal scholar
- Tunku Varadarajan - Indian British-American journalist
- Vivek Ramaswamy - Indian American businessman, conservative activist, and Republican presidential candidate
- Anna Chennault - Chinese American war correspondent
- Michelle Malkin - Filipina American conservative commentator
- Mia Cathell - far-right Chinese American journalist and conservative commentator
- Tila Tequila - Vietnamese American media personality
- Neil Patel (political advisor) - Co-founder and publisher of The Daily Caller of Indian ancestry
- Andy Ngo - Vietnamese-American journalist, author and social media personality
- Kaiji Tang - Chinese-American voice actor
- Shalabh Kumar - Founder of the Republican Hindu Coalition, financial contributor to Donald Trump's presidential campaign
- Soong Mei-ling - Widow of Chiang Kai-Shek she lived in the United States from 1975 to her death
- Rachelle B. Chong - Former Commissioner of the Federal Communications Commission, former Commissioner of the California Public Utilities Commission
- Gordon G. Chang - journalist, lawyer, political commentator, writer, he has spoken to the Conservative Political Action Conference multiple times.
- Mehmet Oz - television personality, physician, author, professor emeritus at Columbia Medical School and former conservative Republican political candidate.
- Solomon Yue - Chinese-American businessperson and conservative Republican activist.
- Vince Dao - American conservative political commentator and social media personality. His promotion of conservatism brought him media recognition. Dao is from Los Angeles, California and is of Vietnamese and Italian descent.
- Dimash Niyazov - kazakh professional boxer.
- Lisa Song Sutton - entrepreneur, philanthropist, speaker writer and former congressional candidate
- Usha Vance - Second Lady of the United States
- Kash Patel - American attorney, Director of the Federal Bureau of Investigation
- Jay Bhattacharya - Director of the National Institute of Health.
- Steven Cheung - White House Communications Director
- Ming Chin - Former Associate Justice of the California Supreme Court.
- Lanhee Chen - Political advisor to the Mitt Romney campaign.
- Alina Habba - Attorney
- Brandon Vera - mixed martial artist
- Mark Muñoz - mixed martial artist
- Che Ahn - pastor

== See also ==
- Asian Americans in politics
- Black conservatism in the United States
- Hispanic and Latino conservatism in the United States
- Ethnocultural politics in the United States
- LGBTQ conservatism in the United States
- Women in conservatism in the United States
