= 1959 Hawaii Senate election =

- July 28, 1959

All 25 seats in the Hawaii Senate 13 seats needed for a majority
- Turnout: 93.6%
	Majority party	Minority party
Leader	William Hardy Hill	—
Party	Republican	Democratic
Leader's seat	1–Hilo	—
Seats won	14	11
Popular vote	337,976	335,993
Percentage	50.00%	49.71%
- Results: Democratic gain Republican gain Multi-member districts: Majority Democratic Majority Republican
Hawaii Senate President before election
Office established
Elected Hawaii Senate President
William Hardy Hill
Republican

The 1959 Hawaii Senate election was held on July 28, 1959, in Hawaii's last days as a territory to elect members of the first Hawaii State Legislature. All 25 seats of the Senate were up for election, with 14 seats being won by Republicans and 11 by Democrats.

Longtime territorial legislator William H. Hill from Hilo was elected President of the Senate, the first Senate president during statehood.

== Results by district ==
Source: "OFFICIAL TABULATION • RESULT OF VOTES CAST GENERAL ELECTION TUESDAY, JULY 28, 1959" (Document). Honolulu, HI: State of Hawaii Office of Elections. August 6, 1959. p. 3-37. Obtained from the State of Hawaii Office of Elections on 15 April 2024.

=== District 1 ===
Senate District 1, located on the eastern half of Hawaii, was entitled to five state senators.

1959 Hawaii Senate election, District 1
Party	Candidate	Votes	%
Republican	William H. Hill	11,639	16.7%
Democratic	Nelson K. Doi	10,819	15.6%
Democratic	John T. Ushijima	8,266	11.9%
Republican	Richard Lyman Jr.	8,202	11.8%
Democratic	Kazuhisa Abe	7,901	11.3%
Republican	Stafford L. Austin	7,809	11.2%
Democratic	Mark Norman Olds	7,037	10.1%
Republican	Wing Kong Chong	4,835	6.9%
Republican	Charles T. Hashimoto	2,836	4.1%
Total votes		69,344	100.0

=== District 2 ===
Senate District 2, located on the western half of Hawaii, was entitled to two state senators.

1959 Hawaii Senate election, District 2
Party	Candidate	Votes	%
Republican	Bernard G. Kinney	3,056	32.6%
Republican	Julian R. Yates Jr.	2,871	30.6%
Democratic	Shoji Kawahara	2,586	27.6%
Democratic	John K. Kiaha	842	9.0%
Total votes		9,355	100.0

=== District 3 ===
Senate District 3, located on the islands of Kahoolawe, Maui, Molokai, and Lanai, was entitled to five state senators.

1959 Hawaii Senate election, District 3
Party	Candidate	Votes	%
Democratic	George S. Fukuoka	7,983	12.7%
Democratic	Thomas S. Ogata	7,869	12.5%
Democratic	Nadao Yoshinaga	7,715	12.3%
Republican	Marquis F. Calmes	7,703	12.3%
Republican	Barney Tokunaga	7,127	11.3%
Republican	Herbert C. Jackson	7,008	11.2%
Democratic	John Gomes Duarte	6,995	11.1%
Republican	William O. Smith	6,006	9.6%
Republican	David K. Kahookele	4,151	6.6%
Total votes		62,557	100.0

=== District 4 ===
Senate District 4, located in Honolulu on Oahu, was entitled to five state senators.

1959 Hawaii Senate election, District 4
Party	Candidate	Votes	%
Republican	Hebden Porteus	35,503	13.2%
Republican	Yasutaka Fukushima	30,614	11.4%
Republican	Randolph Crossley	27,282	10.1%
Democratic	O. Vincient Espotito	26,796	9.9%
Republican	J. Ward Russell	26,787	9.9%
Democratic	Russell K. Kono	26,666	9.9%
Democratic	John J. Hulten	25,401	9.4%
Republican	Richard Sutton	23,435	8.7%
Democratic	Ernest K Kai	22,417	8.3%
Democratic	Anna Furtado Kahanamoku	21,588	8.0%
Commonwealth	William H. Crozier Jr.	1,958	0.7%
Total votes		268,447	100.0

=== District 5 ===
Senate District 5, located on most of Oahu surrounding Honolulu, was entitled to five state senators.

1959 Hawaii Senate election, District 5
Party	Candidate	Votes	%
Democratic	George R. Ariyoshi	31,695	13.2%
Democratic	Sakae Takahashi	31,107	12.9%
Republican	Lawrence Kunihisa	26,112	10.8%
Democratic	Steere G. Noda	25,691	10.7%
Republican	Calvin C. McGregor	25,494	10.6%
Republican	Peter Aduja	24,620	10.2%
Democratic	Philip Minn	23,992	9.9%
Democratic	Charles Ernest Kauhane	19,789	8.2%
Republican	Joseph L. Dwight Sr.	17,094	7.1%
Republican	Stephen R. Benchwich	14,505	6.0%
Total votes		240,099	100.0

=== District 6 ===
Senate District 6, located on the islands of Kauai and Niihau, was entitled to three state senators.

1959 Hawaii Senate election, District 6
Party	Candidate	Votes	%
Democratic	Manuel Souza Henriques	4,785	18.2%
Republican	Abel Medeiros	4,682	17.9%
Democratic	William E. Fernandes	4,655	17.7%
Republican	Clint Shiraishi	4,527	17.3%
Republican	Yoshiichi Yoshida	4,108	15.7%
Democratic	William Y. Hayashi	3,398	12.9%
Total votes		26,155	100.0

== See also ==
- 1959 Hawaii gubernatorial election
- 1959 United States Senate elections in Hawaii
- 1959 United States House of Representatives election in Hawaii
