= Governor Long =

Governor Long may refer to:

- Earl Long (1895–1960), 45th Governor of Louisiana, brother of Huey Long
- Huey Long (1893–1935), 40th Governor of Louisiana
- John Davis Long (1838–1915), 32nd Governor of Massachusetts
- Oren E. Long (1889–1965), Territorial Governor of Hawaii, 1951 to 1953
