= David Chang (disambiguation) =

David Chang (born 1977) is an American restaurateur, author, and television personality.

David Chang may also refer to:

- David S. Chang (born 1980) is an American executive
- David Chang, pleaded guilty to violating federal election laws regarding the Robert Torricelli campaign

== See also ==
- David Chiang (born 1947), Hong Kong actor, director and producer
