= Matthew Heilman =

American politician (born 2001)

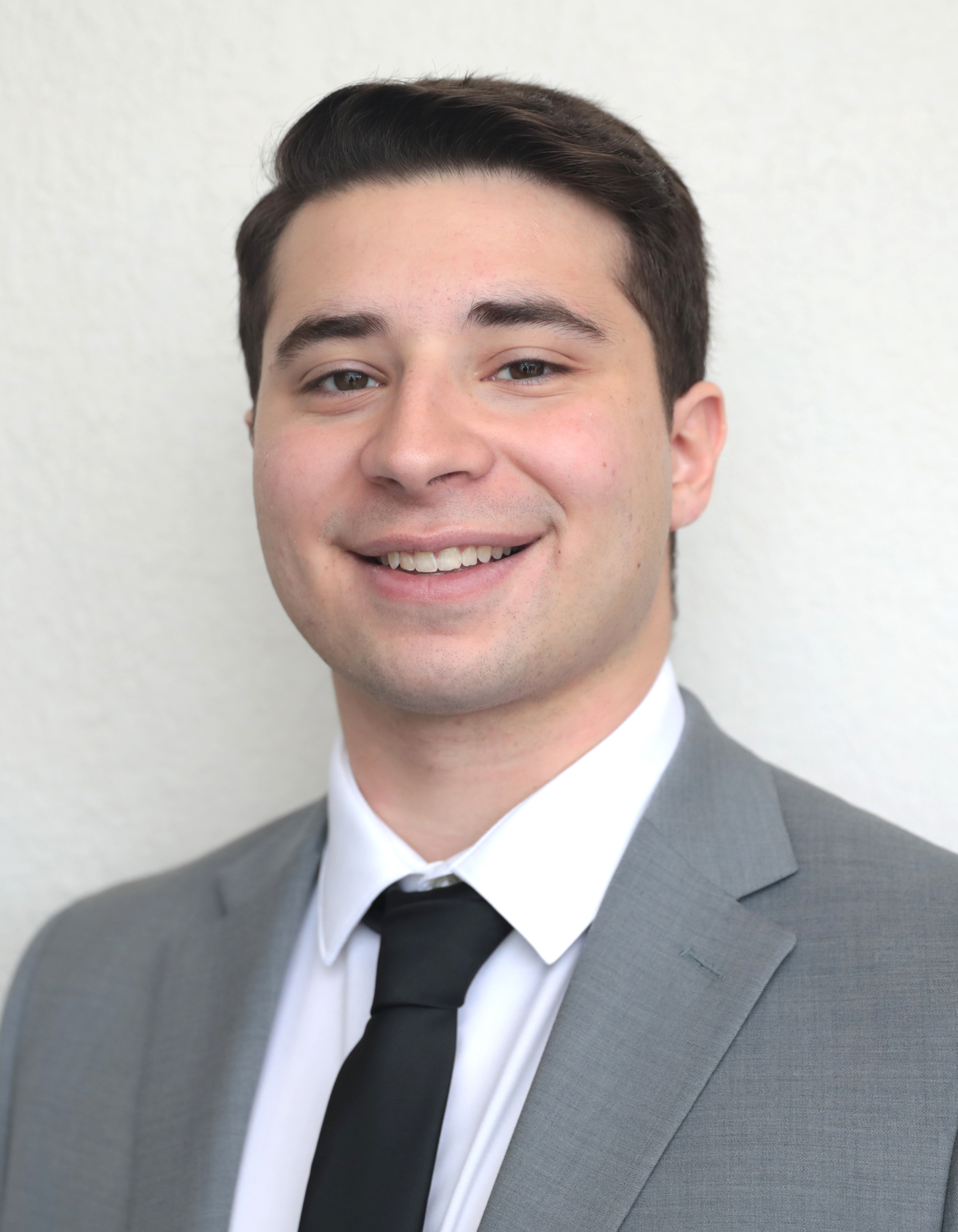

Member of the North Dakota House of Representatives from the 7th district
- Incumbent
- Assumed office December 1, 2022
- Preceded by: Rick Becker
- Succeeded by: Greg Vetter (elect)

Personal details
- Born: July 19, 2001 (age 25) Bismarck, North Dakota, U.S.
- Party: Republican
- Education: Bismarck State College

Matthew Heilman (born July 19, 2001) is an American politician who is a member of the North Dakota House of Representatives, representing the 7th district. His district comprises part of Burleigh County.

Heilman is a member of the far-right faction of the Republican Party, frequently espousing extremist views on immigration, LGBTQ rights, and abortion.

== Education and early career ==
Heilman graduated from Bismarck State College (BSC) in North Dakota. Prior to his election, he served as the founder and president of the BSC chapter of Turning Point USA, as well as a precinct committeeman for the District 7 Republicans.

== Politics ==
=== Elections ===
On January 10, 2022, Heilman announced his candidacy in the 2022 election to represent the 7th district in the North Dakota House of Representatives, citing the prevention and elimination of employer-instituted vaccine mandates as his primary motivation. He won the Republican primary with 34.7% of the vote and won the general election unopposed.

=== Tenure ===
In July 2022, Heilman spoke at the far-right State of the Movement conference presented by Vince Dao's organization, American Virtue.

In August 2022, Heilman was revealed to be a member of a Telegram group called the North Dakota Young Republicans which "frequently featured bigoted slurs and white supremacist tropes" in its messages between members, including personal attacks against gay public figures and anti-Semitic conspiracy theories.

In December 2022, Heilman re-Tweeted a post calling the Jewish President of Ukraine, Volodymyr Zelenskyy, "anti-Christ" for "actively [persecuting] Russian and Ukrainian Christians.

== Political positions ==
=== Cryptocurrency ===
In January 2025, Heilman and seven other legislators introduced Resolution 3001, which aimed to invest "select state funds in digital assets and precious metals".

=== Education ===
Heilman supported House Bill 1494, which aimed at making school meals more accessible to students and overwhelmingly passed into law.

In March 2023, while speaking in support of a bill, Heilman claimed that "at different universities throughout the state, [students have] had professors telling them that white people should feel guilty about past treatment of slaves or Native Americans".

In January 2025, Heilman sponsored House Bill 1607, which sought to use state funds for private school tuitions. The bill was overwhelmingly rejected by the House, 16 to 71.

=== Gun rights ===
Heilman introduced House Bill 1404, a bill to allow university students to carry weapons on campus, stating, "If [students] were carrying, it would be a great deterrent for people who want to commit violent acts against them".

In January 2025, Heilman proposed House Bill 1411, which sought to ban the use of red flag laws.

=== Immigration ===
Heilman opposes sanctuary cities, supporting a bill that would ban them in North Dakota. He stated that this was a proactive measure to prevent what he called "utter disarray" at the southern border from coming to North Dakota.

Heilman has called for an end to birthright citizenship, and has called for mass deportations.

=== Religion ===
In January 2025, Heilman proposed House Bill 1150, which sought to reinstate portions of North Dakota's blue law to prohibit all retail stores to open on Sunday mornings. In a committee hearing, he said that he did not think people should have to “jump hurdles” to practice their religion and that there are "more important matters in life" than economics. The bill was overwhelmingly rejected in the House, 89 to 4, after receiving extensive criticism.

== Personal life ==
Heilman is an Eagle Scout.
