= Charles T. Ushijima =

American politician

Member of the Hawaii House of Representatives
- In office 1969–1980

Personal details
- Born: August 17, 1932 Hilo, Hawaii, U.S.
- Died: July 21, 1992 (aged 59)
- Party: Democratic
- Education: University of Hawaiʻi at Mānoa

Charles Tetsuo Ushijima (August 17, 1932 – July 21, 1992) was an American politician. He served as a Democratic member of the Hawaii House of Representatives.

== Life and career ==
Ushijima was born in Hilo, Hawaii. He attended the University of Hawaiʻi at Mānoa in 1954.

Ushijima had been the assistant vice president of the First National Bank when he stood for election for the 15th district. He won the seat replacing incumbent George K. Noguchi. He served in the Hawaii House of Representatives from 1969 to 1980.

While Ushijima was at times attested to be the brother of his fellow Hilo-based legislator, State Senator John T. Ushijima, other sources listed them as having separate parents.

Ushijima died on July 21, 1992, at the age of 59.
