= Cecil Heftel =

American politician and businessman (1924–2010)

Cec Heftel
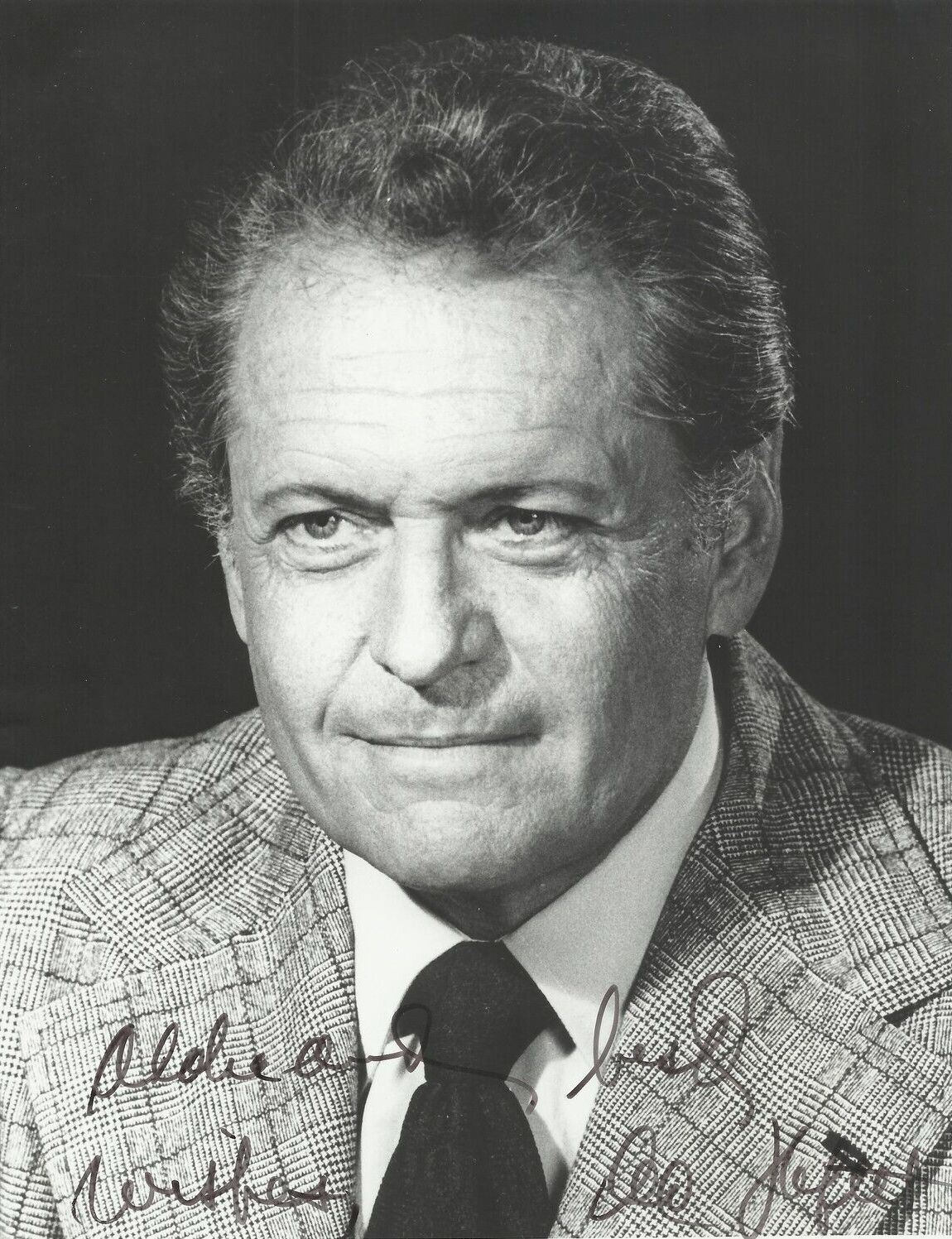

Member of the U.S. House of Representatives from Hawaii's 1st district
- In office January 3, 1977 – July 11, 1986
- Preceded by: Spark Matsunaga
- Succeeded by: Neil Abercrombie

Personal details
- Born: Cecil Landau Heftel; September 30, 1924 Chicago, Illinois, U.S.
- Died: February 4, 2010 (aged 85) San Diego, California, U.S.
- Party: Democratic
- Spouse(s): Edris Glasmann; Rebecca Glass
- Children: 7
- Education: Arizona State University, Tempe (BS); University of Utah (attended); New York University (attended)

Military service
- Allegiance: United States
- Branch/service: United States Army
- Years of service: 1943–1946
- Battles/wars: World War II

Cecil Landau Heftel (September 30, 1924 – February 4, 2010) was an American politician and businessman from Hawaii. A member of the Democratic Party, Heftel served in the United States House of Representatives from 1977 to 1986, representing Hawaii's 1st congressional district.

== Early years ==
Heftel was born in Chicago, Illinois; his maternal grandparents were from Russia and his paternal grandparents from Poland. He attended Roosevelt High School in Albany Park, Chicago, then obtained his bachelor's degree from Arizona State University in 1951. Heftel then started law school at the University of Utah and as a Root-Tilden Scholar at the New York University, but never completed the degree. Heftel was a Latter-day Saint.

Heftel settled in Honolulu and established Heftel Broadcasting. He owned KGMB-AM-FM-TV and several other television and radio stations across the country. From 1943 to 1946, Heftel served in the United States Army.

In 1957 Heftel was a pioneer for what was then called Top 30 programming, when he purchased KIMN in Denver. In one of the nation's most competitive radio markets, KIMN became the dominant, #1 rated radio station. Heftel sold the station in 1960, returning to Hawaii, but once again in 1973 re-entered the mainland with the purchase of WHYI-FM, Ft. Lauderdale, Florida, identifying the station as Y-100. In 1974, Heftel hired consultant John Rook, who secured the services of Jackson, Mississippi programmer Bill Tanner, who crafted a Top 40 format described by Tanner as being "predictable unpredictability" that propelled the station to the top of the south Florida ratings, where it stayed for several years. The station was later sold by Heftel. He also purchased WJAS in Pittsburgh, which he later sold.

Heftel had a knack for getting in and out of station ownership in the 1970s, 1980s, and 1990s. As broadcast revenues are tied to audience interest (ratings) and to advertising cycles, it can be a great business or a poor one. Heftel's mostly AM group of Top-40 stations was sold in the late 1970s. The next group of stations Heftel purchased consisted of FM stations which were coming into their own in the early seventies. These were sold off in the 1980s and included WZPL (move into Indianapolis) and WLLT (Cincinnati).

Heftel partnered with Scott Ginsburg for a time in 1986–1987 as H & G Communications. This group included WLUP-AM-FM Chicago, stations in Miami, and other cities.

The last Heftel Broadcasting accumulation of stations consisted of New York, Los Angeles, Chicago, Dallas, Las Vegas, and Miami. These were taken over by Clear Channel Communications in a 1996 tender offer. This in turn was merged with Mac Tichenor's Tichenor Media System into a new Heftel Broadcasting. That changed its name to Hispanic Broadcasting Corp (now Univision Radio).

== Political career ==
Upon returning to his business in Honolulu, Heftel decided to run for political office.

In 1970, Heftel was the Democratic nominee for the U.S. Senate, but lost to incumbent Republican Hiram Fong by a margin of 52%–48%. He became a delegate to the 1972 Hawai'i Democratic State Convention. There, he was elected in caucus as a delegate to the Democratic National Convention.

In 1976, Heftel was elected to the U.S. House from the state's 1st congressional district, and was re-elected four times thereafter. While in office, Heftel was part of a U.S. fact-finding mission to the Philippines, largely responsible for the forced ouster of dictator Ferdinand Marcos.

Heftel voted for the Economic Recovery Tax Act of 1981. The Act aimed to stimulate economic growth by significantly reducing income tax rates. It passed the House of Representatives in a 323–107 vote, the Senate via a voice vote, and it was signed into law by President Ronald Reagan on August 13, 1981. However, Heftel voted against the Omnibus Budget Reconciliation Act of 1981. The Act decreased federal spending and increased military funding. Despite his vote against it, the bill passed the House of Representatives in a 232–193 vote, the Senate via a voice vote, and it was signed into law by President Ronald Reagan the same day.

Heftel resigned on July 19, 1986, to run for governor, but lost the Democratic primary to John Waihee. Heftel blamed the loss on a smear campaign accusing him of involvement in drugs and sexual relations with "young males and females," suggesting that Heftel was a bisexual pedophile. Democrats long have asserted that the smear came from Republicans looking to run against Waihee as an easier-to-defeat opponent. Many in Hawaii political circles, however, believe the smear was orchestrated by a more powerful political machine that was afraid of Heftel's honest, no-nonsense approach.

== Post congressional career ==
In 1992, he was a supporter of the presidential campaign of Ross Perot.

In 1998, he briefly returned to the political realm, authoring a book, End Legalized Bribery, in which he attempted to prove that the current state of campaign finance corrupts politicians, prevents qualified individuals from running for office, and costs citizens billions of dollars in pork barrel spending and corporate welfare. The book also contained arguments in favor of a national Clean Elections law and mandatory free commercial airtime for political candidates.

After 18 years out of the spotlight, the 80-year-old Heftel made a successful return to elective politics by being elected in November 2004 to the state Board of Education for the Oahu-At Large seat.

== Death and legacy ==
Cecil Heftel died on February 4, 2010, from natural causes in San Diego, California. He was 85. (Numerous websites claim he died February 5, but his widow says he died on February 4.) On June 13, 2011, U.S. Rep. Colleen Hanabusa introduced legislation to designate the post office at 4354 Pahoa Avenue in Honolulu as the "Cecil L. Heftel Post Office Building".

Party political offices
Preceded by Thomas Gill	Democratic nominee for U.S. Senator from Hawaii (Class 1); 1970	Succeeded by Spark Matsunaga
U.S. House of Representatives
Preceded by Spark Matsunaga	Member of the U.S. House of Representatives from Hawaii's 1st congressional district 1977–1986	Succeeded by Neil Abercrombie
