= 1959 United States Senate elections in Hawaii =

The 1959 United States Senate elections in Hawaii were held July 28, 1959. Following the admission of Hawaii as the 50th state in the union, the state held two simultaneous elections to determine its first senators.

The elections were split between the Republican and Democratic parties. The new senators took office on August 21. Oren E. Long was given seniority based on his service as Governor of Hawaii. Hiram Fong became the first Asian-American U.S. Senator.

== Class 1 ==
1959 class 1 Senate election
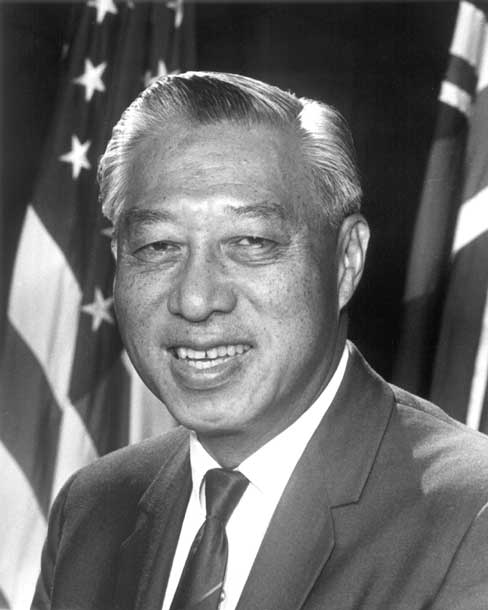

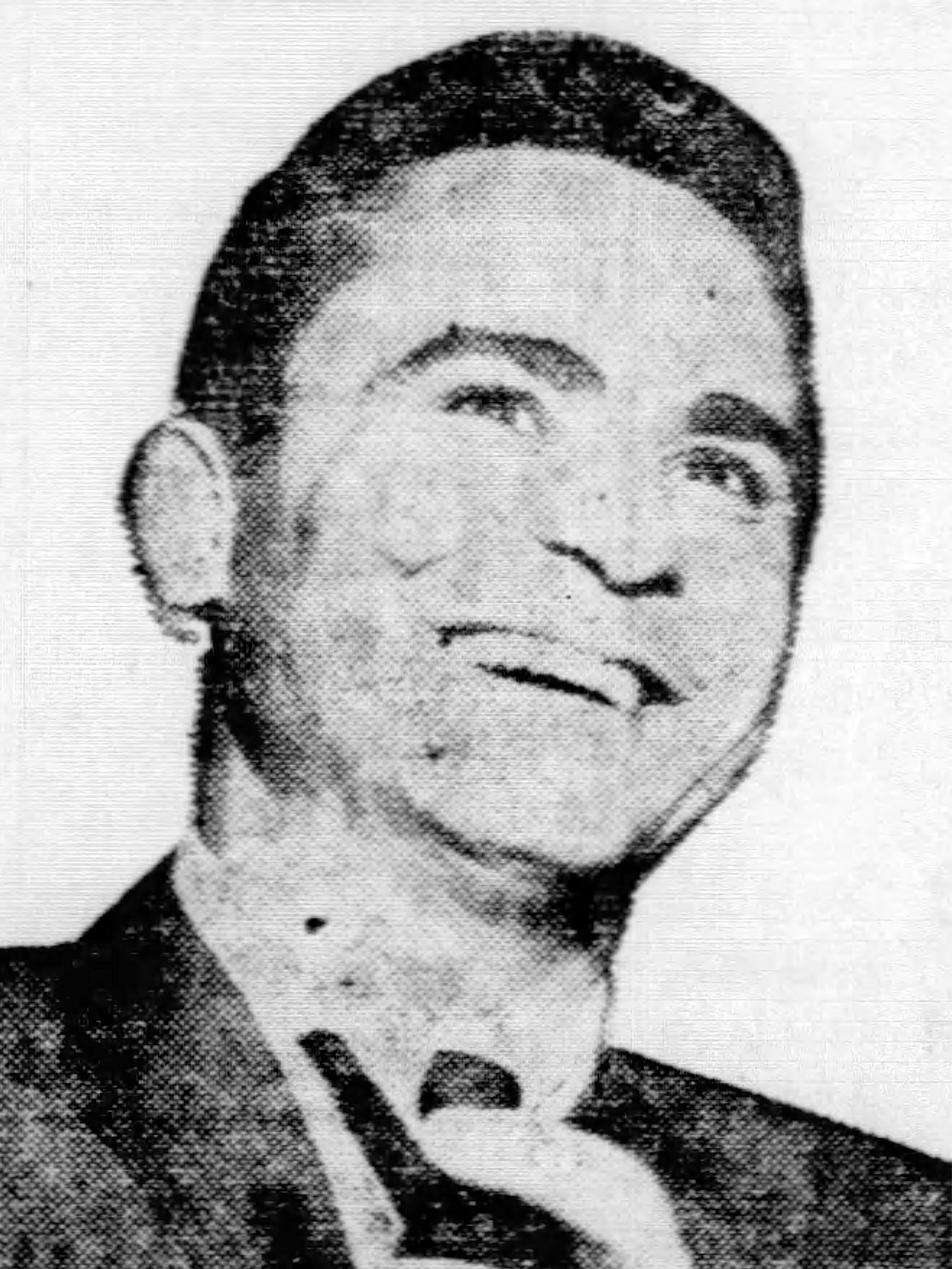
| Nominee | Hiram Fong | Frank Fasi |
| Party | Republican | Democratic |
| Popular vote | 87,161 | 77,647 |
| Percentage | 52.89% | 47.11% |
- Fong: 50–60% 60–70% Fasi: 50–60%
Elected U.S. senator
Hiram Fong
Republican

This election was for the class 1 term expiring in 1965. It was won by Republican Hiram Fong.

=== General election ===
==== Candidates ====
- Frank Fasi, Territorial Senator (Democratic)
- Hiram Fong, former member of the Territorial Legislature (Republican)

==== Results ====
1959 United States Senate election in Hawaii (class 1)
| Party | Candidate | Votes | % |
|---|---|---|---|
| Republican | Hiram Fong | 87,161 | 52.89% |
| Democratic | Frank Fasi | 77,647 | 47.11% |
| Total votes | | 164,808 | 100.00% |
| Republican win (new seat) | | | |

== Class 3 ==
1959 class 3 Senate election
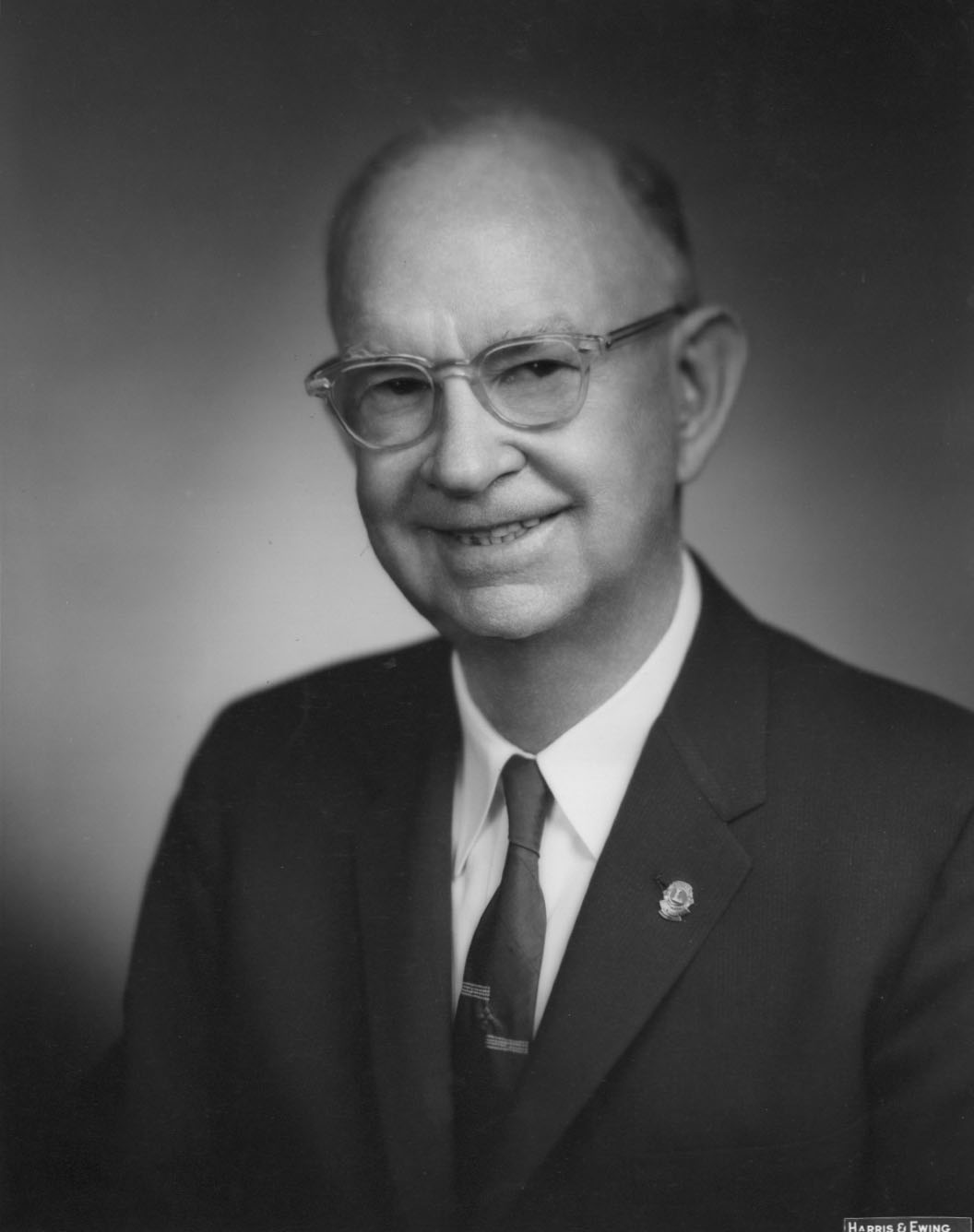

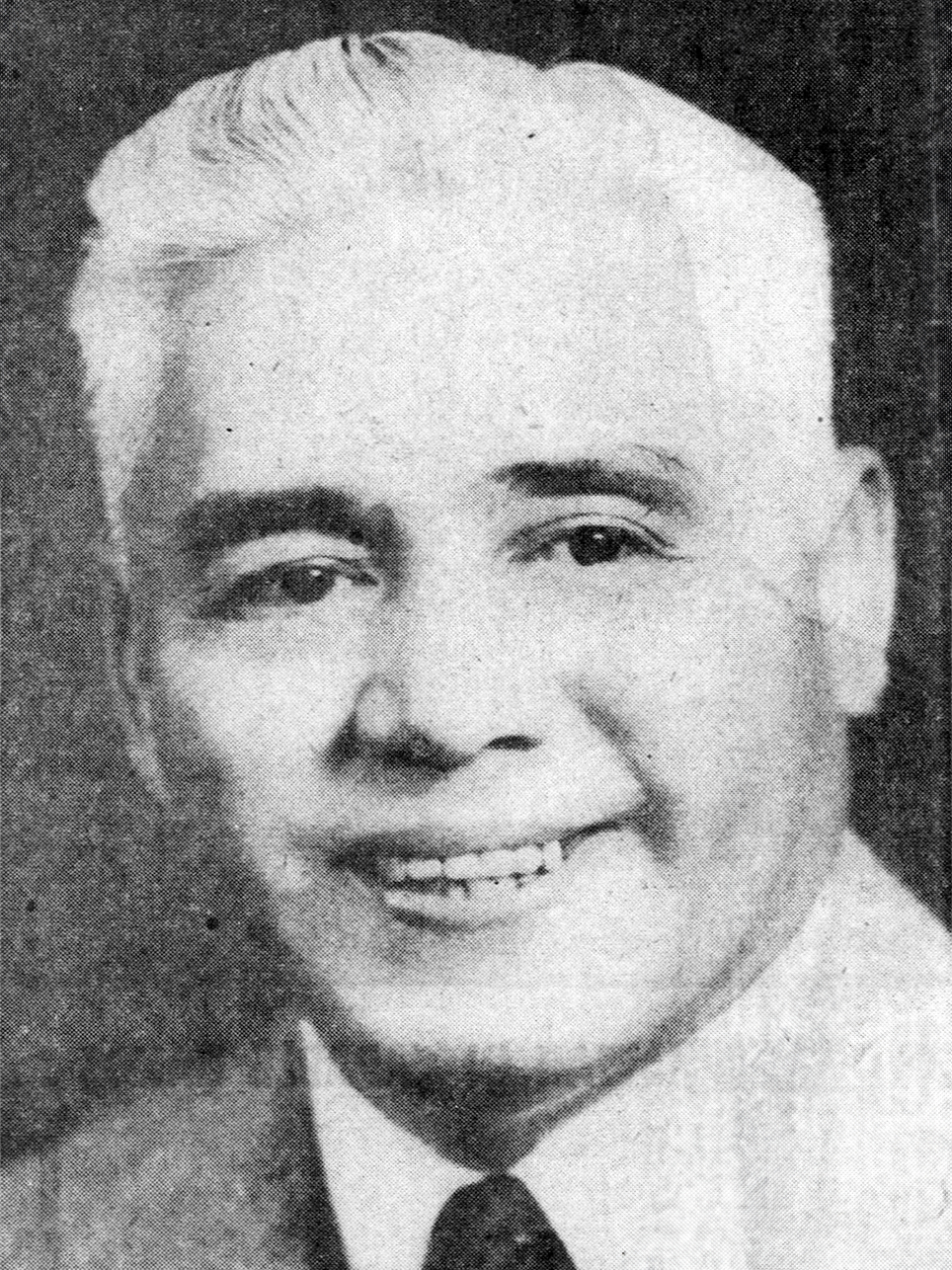
| Nominee | Oren Long | Wilfred Tsukiyama |
| Party | Democratic | Republican |
| Popular vote | 83,700 | 79,123 |
| Percentage | 51.08% | 48.28% |
- Long: 50–60% Tsukiyama: 40–50% 50–60%
Elected U.S. senator
Oren Long
Democratic

This election was for the Class 3 term expiring in 1963. It was won by Democrat Oren Long, who started an as-of-yet uninterrupted streak of Democratic victories in the Class 3 Senate seat in Hawaii. As of 2022, Tsukiyama's loss by a 2.8 point margin is the closest Republicans have come to winning this seat.

=== General election ===
==== Candidates ====
- Oren Long, former territorial Governor of Hawaii (Democratic)
- Eugene Ressencourt (Commonwealth)
- Wilfred Tsukiyama, former President of the Territorial Senate (Republican)

==== Results ====
1959 United States Senate election in Hawaii (class 3)
| Party | Candidate | Votes | % |
|---|---|---|---|
| Democratic | Oren Long | 83,700 | 51.08% |
| Republican | Wilfred Tsukiyama | 79,123 | 48.28% |
| Commonwealth | Eugene G. Ressencourt | 1,052 | 0.64% |
| Total votes | | 163,875 | 100.00% |
| Democratic win (new seat) | | | |

Following Long's victory, Governor William F. Quinn appointed Tsukiyama to the Hawaii Supreme Court.

== See also ==
- 1959 Hawaii gubernatorial election
- 1959 United States House of Representatives election in Hawaii
- 1959 Hawaii Senate election
