= 1970 United States Senate election in Hawaii =

- November 3, 1970
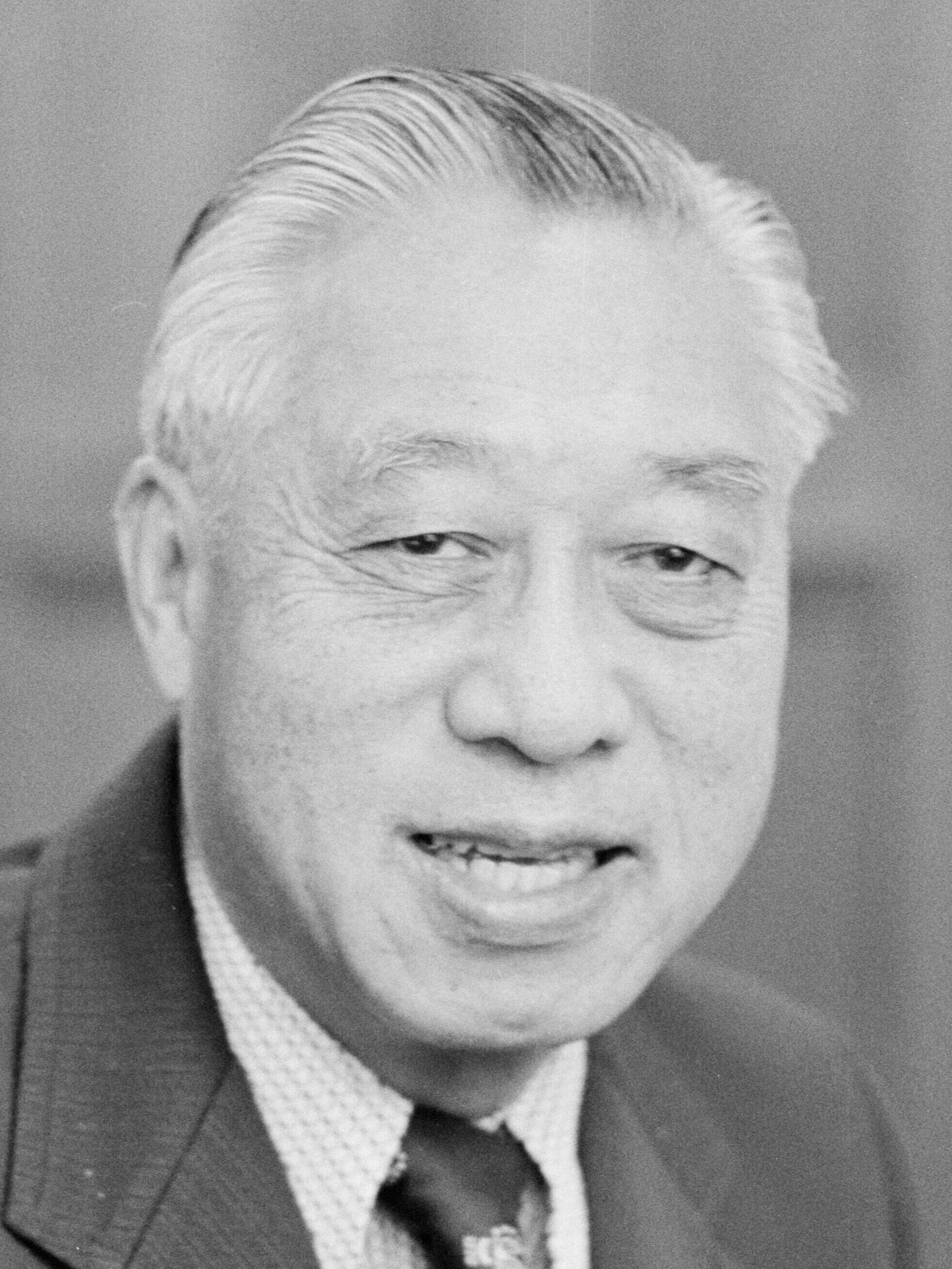

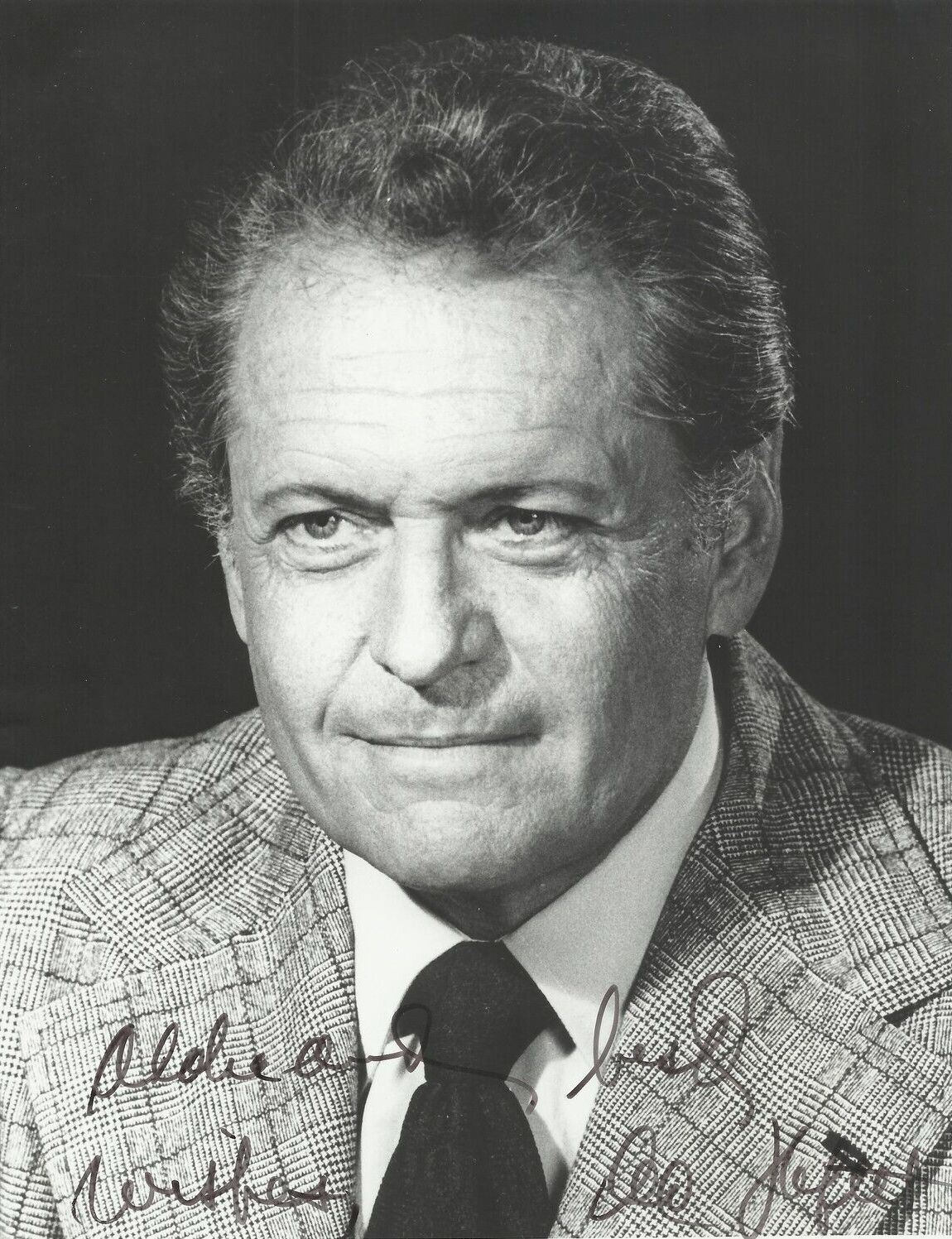
Nominee	Hiram Fong	Cecil Heftel
Party	Republican	Democratic
Popular vote	124,163	116,597
Percentage	51.57%	48.43%
- County results Fong: 50–60%
U.S. senator before election
Hiram Fong
Republican
Elected U.S. Senator
Hiram Fong
Republican

The 1970 United States Senate election in Hawaii took place on November 3, 1970. Incumbent Republican Senator Hiram Fong was re-elected to a third term in office, narrowly defeating Democratic businessman Cecil Heftel.

According to the Honolulu Star-Bulletin, Fong's support for the Vietnam War led to his close call in the 1970 election. As of 2026, this remains the last U.S. Senate election in Hawaii won by a Republican, and the last time they carried any counties in an U.S. Senate election.

== Democratic primary ==
=== Candidates ===
- Neil Abercrombie, taxi driver, future U.S. Representative and Governor
- Cecil Heftel, owner of Heftel Broadcasting, a radio conglomerate
- Tony Hodges, environmental activist

=== Results ===
Democratic Senate primary
Party	Candidate	Votes	%
Democratic	Cecil Heftel	78,934	62.44%
Democratic	Tony Hodges	30,430	24.07%
Democratic	Neil Abercrombie	17,058	13.49%
Total votes		126,422	100.00%

== General election ==
=== Results ===
1970 United States Senate election in Hawaii
Party	Candidate	Votes	%	±%
Republican	Hiram Fong (incumbent)	124,163	51.57%	▼1.47
Democratic	Cecil Heftel	116,597	48.43%	▲2.08
Total votes		240,760	100.00%	

== See also ==
- 1970 United States Senate elections
