= Vishal Amin =

American attorney and government official

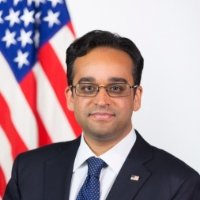

Intellectual Property Enforcement Coordinator
- In office August 2017 – January 20, 2021
- President: Donald Trump
- Preceded by: Daniel (Danny) Marti
- Succeeded by: Deborah Robinson (nominee)

Personal details
- Education: Johns Hopkins University; Washington University in St. Louis

Vishal Amin is an American attorney and former government official. Amin previously served as the White House Intellectual Property Enforcement Coordinator, sometimes referred to as "IP Czar,” under Former President Donald Trump from 2017-2021. This position was created by an act of Congress in 2008 in order to help the U.S. government combat online piracy. Prior to assuming this role, Amin was senior counsel on the House Judiciary Committee.

A graduate of Johns Hopkins University with a degree in neuroscience and Washington University School of Law, Amin served in the administration of George W. Bush as the White House's associate director for domestic policy and as special assistant and associate director for policy in the United States Department of Commerce.

Cary Sherman, chairman and CEO of the Recording Industry Association of America, called Amin "a smart, thoughtful leader."
