= Hiram Fong Jr. =

American politician

Member of the Hawaii House of Representatives
- In office 1971–1979

Personal details
- Born: October 13, 1939 Honolulu, Hawaii, U.S.
- Died: February 18, 2017 (aged 77)
- Party: Republican
- Spouse: Janet Fong
- Parent: Hiram Fong (father)

Hiram Fong Jr. (October 13, 1939 – February 18, 2017) was an American politician. He served as a Republican member of the Hawaii House of Representatives.

== Life and career ==
Fong was the son of Hiram Fong, a politician.

In 1971, Fong was elected to the Hawaii House of Representatives, serving until 1979. In the same year, he was a member of the Honolulu City Council, serving until 1983.

Fong died in February 2017, at the age of 77.
