= Oren E. Long =

Governor of Hawaii Territory (1951–1953)

Oren Long
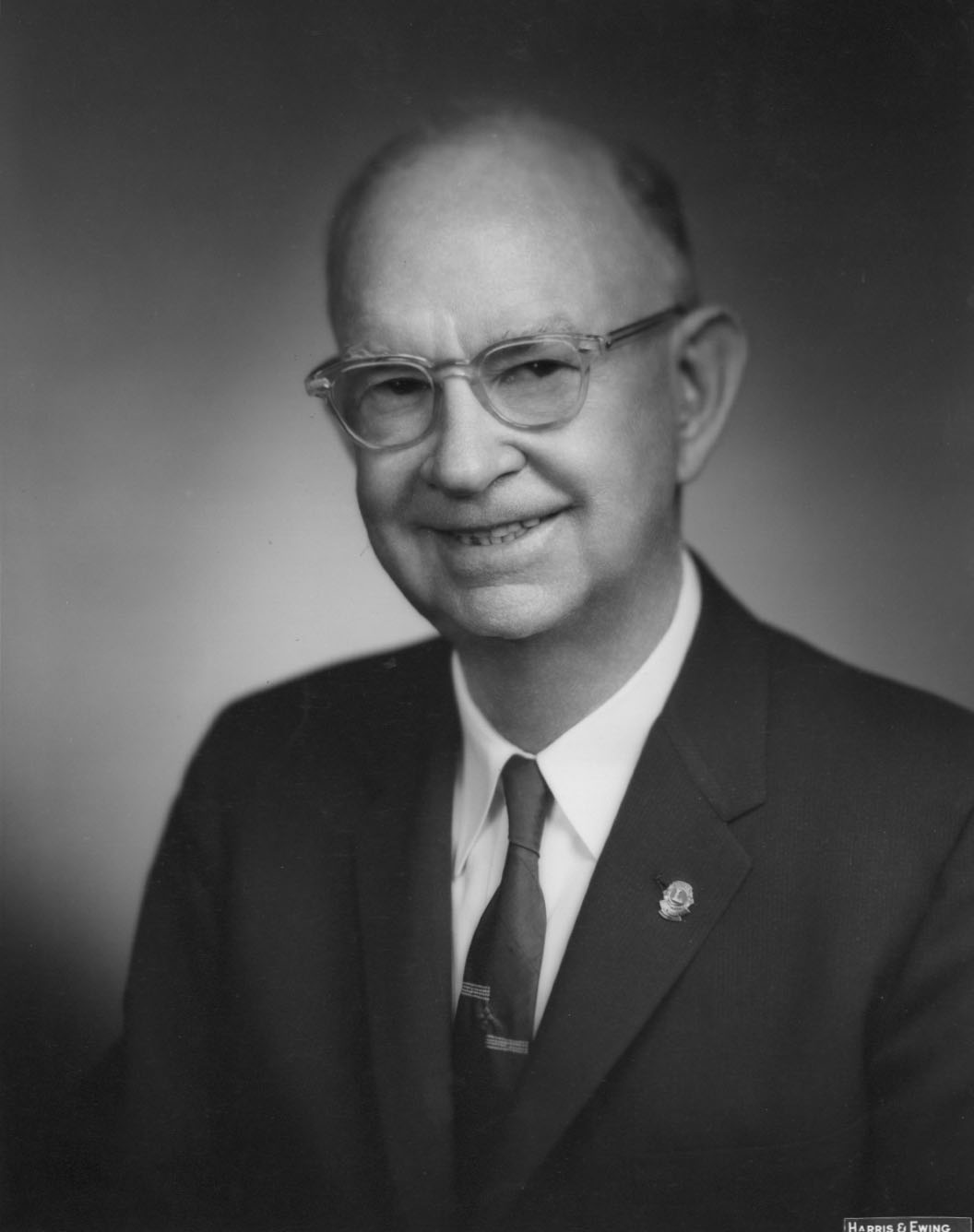

United States Senator from Hawaii
- In office August 21, 1959 – January 3, 1963
- Preceded by: Office established
- Succeeded by: Daniel Inouye

10th Territorial Governor of Hawaii
- In office May 8, 1951 – February 28, 1953
- Appointed by: Harry S. Truman
- Preceded by: Ingram Stainback
- Succeeded by: Samuel King

Personal details
- Born: Oren Ethelbirt Long; March 4, 1889 Altoona, Kansas, U.S.
- Died: May 6, 1965 (aged 76) Honolulu, Hawaii, U.S.
- Resting place: Oahu Cemetery
- Party: Democratic
- Spouse: Ida Geneva Rule
- Education: Johnson University (BA); University of Michigan (MA); Columbia University (MA)

Military service
- Allegiance: United States
- Branch/service: United States Army
- Rank: { General}
- Battles/wars: World War IWorld War II

Oren Ethelbirt Long (March 4, 1889 – May 6, 1965) was an American politician who served as the tenth Territorial Governor of Hawaii from 1951 to 1953. A member of the Democratic Party of Hawaii, Long was appointed to the office after the term of Ingram Stainback. After statehood was achieved he served in the United States Senate, one of the first two, along with Hiram Fong, to represent Hawaii in that body. Long was the only non–Asian American U.S. Senator from Hawaii until the appointment of Brian Schatz to the position in 2012.

== Early life ==
Oren E. Long was born in Altoona, Kansas, on March 4, 1889. His middle name was either Ethelbert or Ethelbirt. He graduated from Johnson University with a bachelor of arts degree in 1912, from the University of Michigan with a master of arts in English and American history in 1916, and Columbia University with a Master of Public Administration degree in 1922.

== Career ==
=== Education ===
Long was a history teacher at Johnson Academy in Kimberlin Heights, Tennessee, from 1912 to 1914, and was principal of the school from 1914 to 1917. He moved to the Territory of Hawaii in 1917. He was deputy superintendent in the Department of Public Instruction from 1925 to 1934, superintendent from 1934 to 1946.

Long served as a second lieutenant on the headquarters staff of the Hawaii Defense Volunteers during World War II.

=== Politics ===
Long was Secretary of Hawaii from 1946 to 1951. President Harry S. Truman appointed him as territorial governor, which he served as from 1951 to 1953. Long served in the Hawaii Territorial Legislature from 1956 to 1959. He was elected to the United States Senate in the 1959 election after Hawaii received statehood.

== Personal life ==
Long married Ida Geneva Rule.

Long died of asthmatic bronchitis in Honolulu, Hawaii, on May 6, 1965. His ashes were lying in state at the ʻIolani Palace on May 9, and interned at Oahu Cemetery on May 10. Long's papers are stored at the University of Hawaiʻi at Mānoa in their Catalog for Archival Materials.

== Works cited ==
=== News ===
- "Oren E. Long; United States Senator, Democrat". The New York Times. July 30, 1959. Archived from the original on December 31, 2025.

=== Web ===
- "Oren E. Long Papers". University of Hawaiʻi. Archived from the original on November 11, 2026.

Political offices
Preceded by Ingram Stainback	Governor of Hawaii; 1951–1953	Succeeded by Samuel King
Party political offices
First	Democratic nominee for U.S. Senator from Hawaii (Class 3); 1959	Succeeded by Dan Inouye
U.S. Senate
New seat	U.S. Senator (Class 3) from Hawaii; 1959–1963; Served alongside: Hiram Fong	Succeeded by Dan Inouye
