= Thomas K. Lalakea =

American politician

Member of the Hawaii House of Representatives
- In office 1965–1966

Personal details
- Born: October 23, 1926 Hilo, Hawaii, U.S.
- Died: September 29, 2015 (aged 88)
- Party: Republican
- Children: 2
- Education: University of Hawaiʻi at Mānoa; Harvard Business School

Thomas Kanamu Lalakea (October 23, 1926 – September 29, 2015) was an American politician. He served as a Republican member of the Hawaii House of Representatives.

== Life and career ==
Born in Hilo, Hawaii, Lalakea attended the Kamehameha School for Boys in Honolulu, University of Hawaiʻi at Mānoa in 1951 and Harvard Business School. He served in the Hawaii House of Representatives from 1965 to 1966. He died on September 29, 2015, at the age of 88.
