= Beth Fukumoto =

American politician

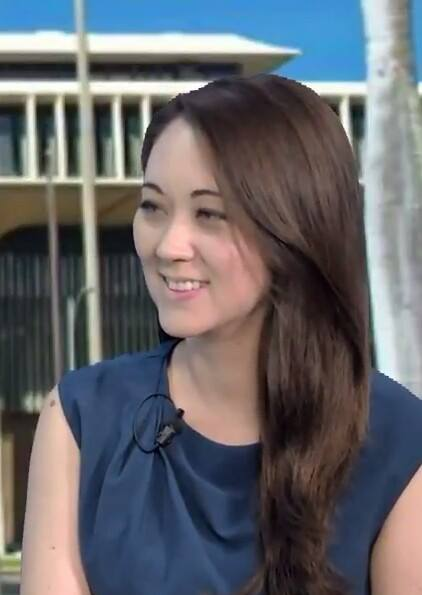

Minority Leader of the Hawaii House of Representatives
- In office December 31, 2014 – February 1, 2017
- Preceded by: Aaron Ling Johanson
- Succeeded by: Andria Tupola

Member of the Hawaii House of Representatives from the 36th district
- In office November 2012 – November 6, 2018
- Preceded by: Redistricted
- Succeeded by: Val Okimoto

Chair of the Hawaii Republican Party
- Acting
- In office September 26, 2011 – November 8, 2011
- Preceded by: Jonah Kaauwai
- Succeeded by: David S. Chang

Personal details
- Born: March 30, 1983 (age 43) Honolulu, Hawaii, U.S.
- Party: Democratic (2017–present)
- Other political affiliations: Republican (Before 2017); Independent (2017)
- Spouse: David S. Chang (2012–2017)
- Education: University of Hawaii, Manoa (BA); Georgetown University (MA)
- Website: Campaign website

Beth Keiko Fukumoto (formerly Fukumoto Chang, born March 30, 1983) is an American politician who served in the Hawaii House of Representatives from 2012 to 2018, representing District 36.

Fukumoto was first elected to the state House of Representatives in 2012 and was the youngest person to serve as the House Minority Leader.

In March 2017, she announced plans to change her party identification from Republican to Democrat citing concerns about racism and sexism. Fukumoto remained an independent until approval of her request to join the Democratic Party on June 19, 2017.

In 2018, Fukumoto ran in the Democratic primary for Hawaii's 1st congressional district in the 2018 elections to replace Colleen Hanabusa, who ran for Governor. The election was won by former Congressman Ed Case.

== Education ==
Fukumoto graduated with honors from the University of Hawaii at Manoa with a B.A. in American Studies with a minor in Sociology. She later received a M.A. in English from Georgetown University.

== Hawaii House of Representatives ==
=== Elections ===
- In 2016, Fukumoto was re-elected to represent District 36 by winning the general election, 6,792 votes (66.7%) against Democratic nominee, Marilyn B. Lee with 3,274 votes.
- In 2014, Fukumoto won District 36 primary election with 1,319 votes and won the November 4, 2014, general election with 5,880 votes (64.5%) against Democratic nominee, Marilyn B. Lee with 3,034 votes (33.3%)
- In 2012, Fukumoto won the general election with 5,334 votes (51.2%) against incumbent Democratic Representative Marilyn Lee, who had been redistricted from District 38.
- In 2010, Fukumoto ran unopposed in the September 18, 2010, Republican primary for District 37, but lost the November 2, 2010, general election to incumbent Representative Ryan Yamane.

=== Tenure ===
Fukumoto represented District 36, Mililani, Mililani Mauka, and Waipio Acres, the district in which she grew up.

In 2013, Fukumoto was awarded the James Madison Fellowship by the Millennial Action Project for her demonstrated success in transcending partisan lines. The Daily Beast named Fukumoto one of "Nine Women Remaking the Right." Fukumoto was also named by The Washington Post as a Top 40 under 40 Rising Political Star.

In February 2017, she was awarded the Aspen-Rodel Fellowship for demonstrating an outstanding ability to work responsibly across partisan divisions.

Fukumoto served as House Minority Leader until 2017, when she was voted out after speaking at a Women's March event in Hawaii.

In early 2017, Fukumoto announced openness to leaving the Republican Party and potentially seeking membership in the Democratic Party.

In her statement, she noted her disapproval of President Donald Trump's behavior and attitude towards women and minorities and her recent estrangement from the Republican Party:

In the last couple years, I’ve watched leaders in the Republican Party become less and less tolerant of diverse opinions and dissenting voices. Today, I’m facing demands for my resignation from leadership and possible censure because I raised concerns about our President’s treatment of women and minorities. I’ve been asked by both my party and my caucus to commit to not criticizing the president for the remainder of his term and to take a more partisan approach to working in the Legislature. That is not a commitment I can make. As a representative of my community, it is my job to hold leaders accountable and to work with anyone, regardless of party, to make Hawaii a better place for our families. This morning, I sent a letter to my district explaining that I would like to leave the Republican Party and seek membership in the Democratic Party. When I was re-elected in November, I was elected as a Republican, and I want to honor my community’s choice by consulting them before any decision is made. As I articulated in my letter, I encourage my constituents to contact me with input and provide feedback. I was elected by the people of Mililani, and I am here to represent them.

On March 22, 2017, Fukumoto released a statement indicating her plans to resign from the Republican Party and seek membership in the Democratic Party. She cited Republican partisanship and overlaps with the Democratic party platform as factors in making this decision. Seeking feedback from her constituents, she received more than 470 letters weighing in on her decision to leave the GOP, with approximately three-quarters supporting the switch. Fukumoto remained an independent until approval of her request to join the Democratic Party on June 19, 2017.

== 2018 U.S. congressional election ==
In 2018, she ran for the open United States House of Representatives seat in Hawaii's 1st congressional district, held by Colleen Hanabusa. She finished fifth in the Democratic primary, won by former Congressman Ed Case. She drew 7,473 votes, or 6.3%.

== See also ==
- List of American politicians who switched parties in office
