= Marvin S. C. Dang =

American lawyer, politician, and lobbyist

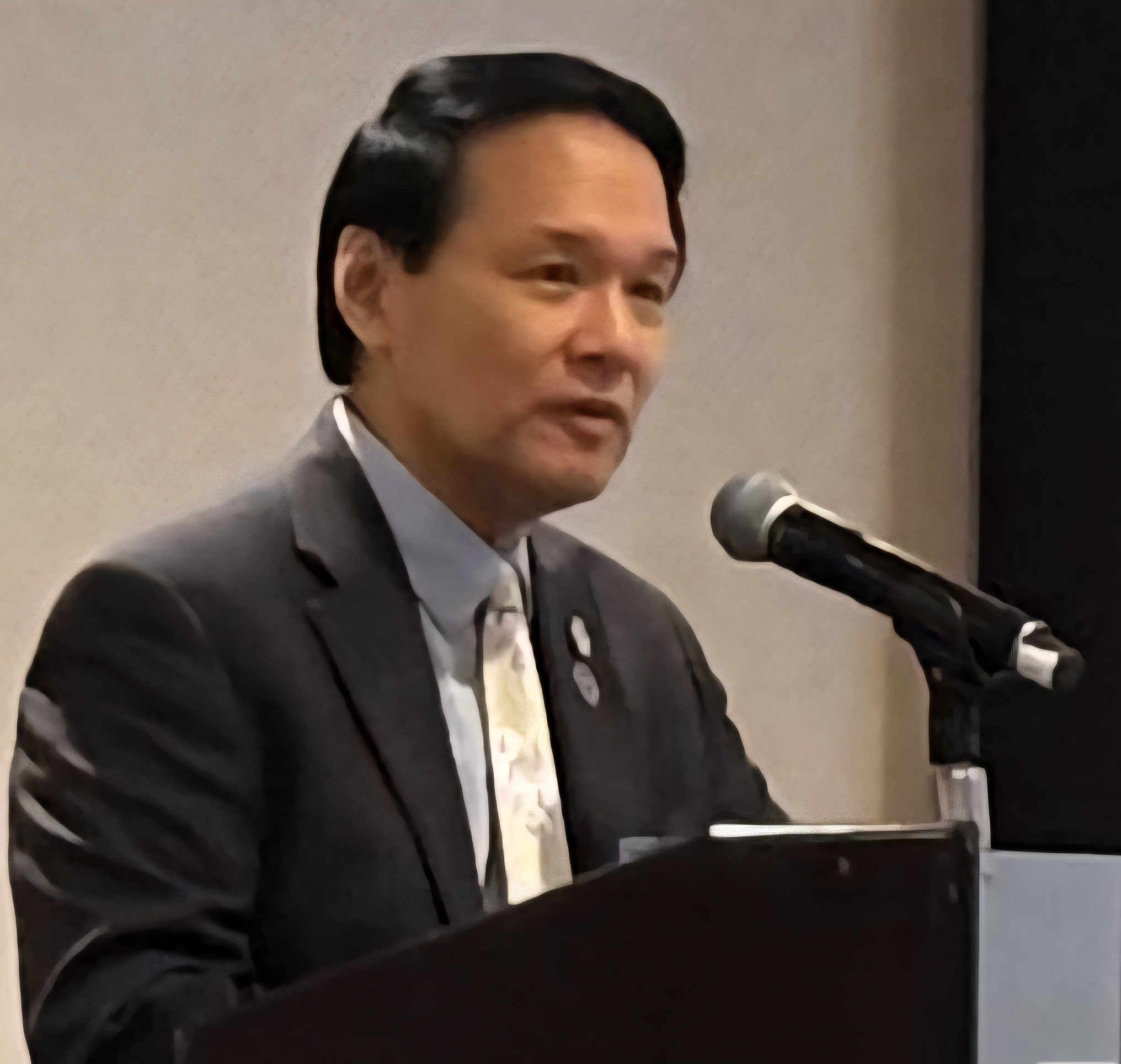
- Marvin S. C. Dang
- Born: Honolulu, Hawaii, United States
- Education: University of Hawaiʻi at Mānoa (BA); George Washington University Law School (JD)
- Occupations: Attorney, lobbyist
- Known for: First Asian American officer of the American Bar Association
- Office: Member of the Hawaii House of Representatives (1982-1984)

Marvin S. C. Dang is an American attorney who became the first Asian American officer of the American Bar Association (ABA), serving as secretary from 2023 to 2026. He is also the first attorney from Hawaii elected as an ABA officer. Dang previously served in the Hawaii House of Representatives from 1982 to 1984 and has practiced law in Hawaii since 1978.

== Early life and education ==
Dang was born in Honolulu, Hawaii. He attended Punahou School in Honolulu, graduating in 1971. He earned his bachelor's degree from the University of Hawaiʻi at Mānoa in 1974 and his Juris Doctor from the George Washington University Law School in 1978.

== Legal career ==
Dang was admitted to the Hawaii State Bar in 1978. He founded the Law Offices of Marvin S. C. Dang, LLLC, in 1981 and serves as its managing member. He also co-manages the Hawaii office of Nelson & Kennard, a multistate creditors-rights law firm based in California. His practice areas include civil litigation, creditors' rights, lobbying and governmental relations, real estate transactions, estate planning, and probate.

Dang has served as parliamentarian of the National Creditors Bar Association (NCBA), becoming the first Asian American and first Hawaii attorney to hold an NCBA officer position. He also chaired the Collection Law Section of the Hawaii State Bar Association.

== Political career ==
Dang was elected to the Hawaii House of Representatives in 1982 and served until 1984, holding the position of assistant minority floor leader. Following his legislative service, he has remained active in Hawaii politics as a registered lobbyist.

== American Bar Association leadership ==
Dang joined the ABA as a law student in 1975 and became an attorney member in 1978. In 2023, he was elected ABA secretary for a three-year term (2023–2026), making history as the first Asian American and first Hawaii attorney to serve as an ABA officer. The ABA secretary is one of four elected officer positions of the organization, which is the largest voluntary association of lawyers in the world.

Throughout his ABA career, Dang has held numerous leadership positions. He served as chair of the ABA Senior Lawyers Division and has been a member of the ABA Board of Governors since 2020. He is also a member of the ABA House of Delegates and has held leadership roles in the Solo, Small Firm and General Practice Division, Young Lawyers Division, and Law Student Division.

In 2006, Dang coordinated the ABA's mock-trial reenactment of the historic Massie Trial during the ABA Annual Meeting in Honolulu, serving as the program's moderator.

== Awards and recognition ==
- Daniel K. Inouye Trailblazer Award, National Asian Pacific American Bar Association (2025)
- Advocate of the Month, ABA Governmental Affairs Office (February 2025)
- President's Award, National Creditors Bar Association (2022–2023)
- Stockton Guard Award, GW Law School (2018)
- Small Firm Practitioner Merit Award, ABA Solo, Small Firm and General Practice Division (2006)
