= Mina Nguyen =

American executive

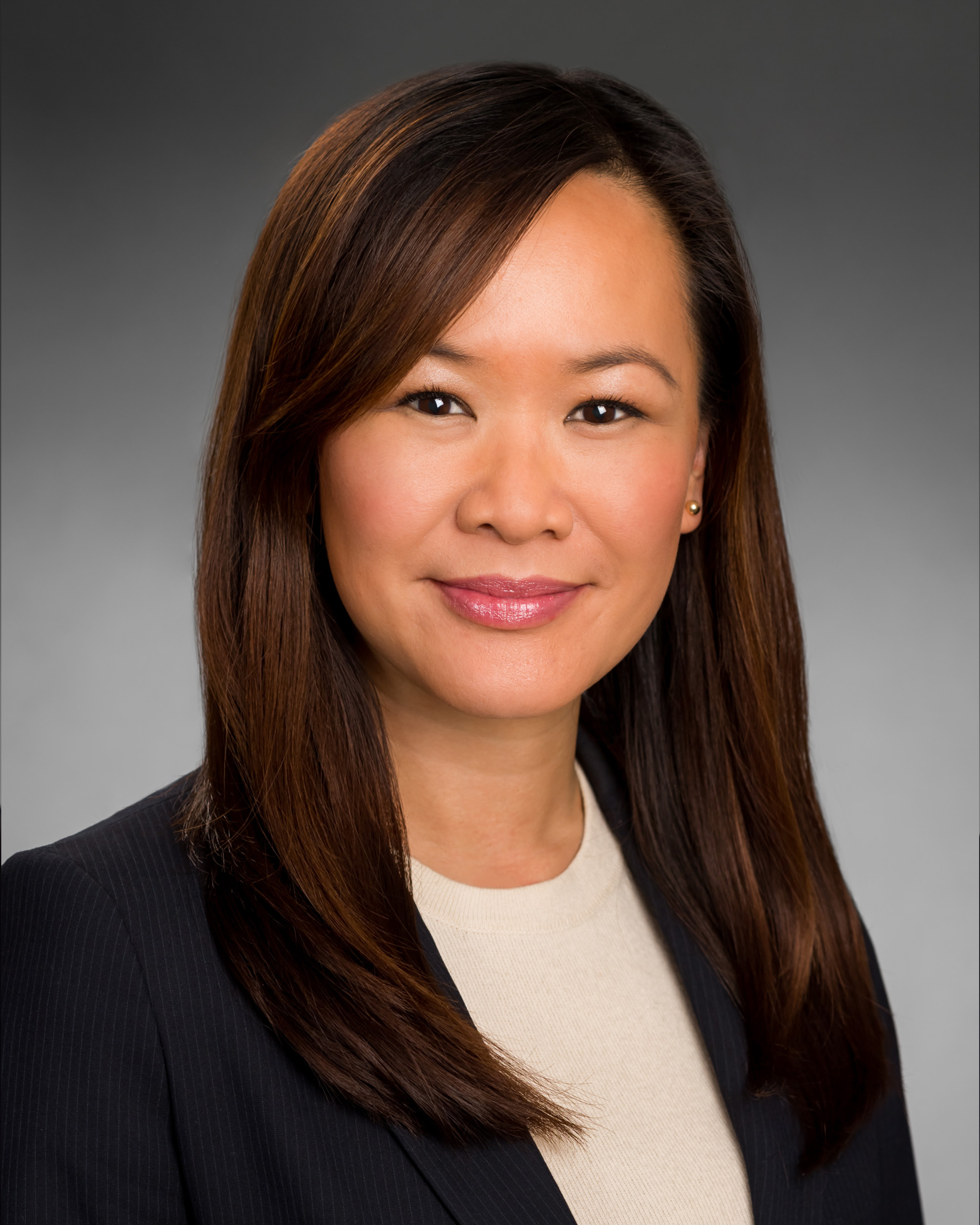
- Mina Nguyen
- Born: Fort Smith, Arkansas
- Education: University of California at Berkeley (BS), Harvard Business School (MBA)
- Occupation: American businesswoman
- Known for: Executive at Jane Street Capital, Senior Adviser and Managing Director at AQR Capital Management, Deputy Assistant Secretary United States Department of the Treasury, National Business Director George W. Bush presidential campaign, 2004

Mina Nguyen is an American executive at Jane Street Capital. In October 2017, she was appointed as a member of the SEC's Investor Advisory Committee. Prior to Jane Street, she was a Managing Director at AQR Capital Management and senior adviser to its founder Cliff Asness. Nguyen was deputy assistant secretary of Business Affairs at the US Treasury Department from 2006 to 2007, appointed by then-Secretary Hank Paulson. Her career in business and government has revolved around regulations for private pools of capital (hedge funds), retirement security, leverage and derivative use at investment funds and ESG investing. In the 2004 US Presidential Campaign she served as National Business Director for the Bush-Cheney ticket.

== Career ==
Nguyen started her career in government as a special assistant to then-United States Secretary of Labor Elaine L. Chao. In 2001, Chao appointed Nguyen as Director of Public Liaison, making her one of the youngest government employees ever to be appointed to the Senior Executive Service.

After the reelection, Nguyen continued to serve in the administration, eventually as deputy assistant secretary of Business Affairs at the U.S. Treasury Department from 2006 to 2007. As deputy assistant secretary, Nguyen was a principal advisor to the Secretary on capital markets regulations and served as a member of the team that developed Treasury's capital markets competitiveness plan which set the framework for a modernized regulatory structure and investor protections. Nguyen was the lead advisor between the Treasury department and asset managers and investors to advance the President's Working Group on Financial Markets’ mandate to define best practices that address investor protection, enhance market discipline, and mitigate systemic risk.

Prior to her government career, Nguyen worked as a technology and financial services management consultant at Accenture.

== Background ==
Nguyen holds an MBA from Harvard Business School and a BS from the Haas School of Business, UC Berkeley.

Nguyen's father was in the Army of the Republic of Vietnam, and fled to the United States in 1975 after the fall of Saigon with his wife and four children. The family settled in Fort Smith, Arkansas where Mina Nguyen was born. The family eventually relocated to Orange County, California. Nguyen currently resides in Greenwich, Connecticut.

== Political ==
While serving on the 2004 George W. Bush Presidential Campaign, Nguyen also headed the "W. Stands for Women" effort, which was credited with significantly increasing Republican support among women. While at the Republican National Committee, Nguyen was Director of Congressional Affairs and senior adviser to its then-chairman, Ken Mehlman.

== Philanthropic and policy activity ==
Nguyen is an adviser to a number of charitable organizations that focus on governance, civil society, and human rights. She is a national board member of Girl Scouts of the USA and a founding board member of the global health organization, World Health Ambassador. Nguyen was a founding member of the Center for Retirement Initiatives at Georgetown University’s McCourt School of Public Policy. She is also the chair of AQR Capital's Philanthropic Committee.

== Press and publications ==
- Harvard Business School, Harbus on Education and Health Care
- "Harvard University AA Policy Review". Asian American Policy Review. Archived from the original on 2019-11-22 – via Questia.
- ABC News Chairman Mehlman announces leadership team
- The War on Terror
- Asian American Policy Review
- President’s Working Group Releases Common Approach to Private Pools of Capital Guidance on hedge fund issues focuses on systemic risk, investor protection
- From East to West, Then Up and to the Right
- Georgetown University Center for Retirement Initiatives
- Reports Warn of Unintended Consequences of Proposed SEC Rule
- Proposed Rule: Use of Derivatives by Registered Investment Companies and Business Development Companies
- Harvard Asian American Alumni Summit
