= Tony Narvaes =

American politician

Member of the Hawaii House of Representatives
- In office 1977–1983

Personal details
- Party: Republican
- Education: Spokane Community College; University of Hawaii

Tony Narvaes is an American politician. He served as a Republican member of the Hawaii House of Representatives.

== Life and career ==
Narvaes attended Damien High School, Spokane Community College and the University of Hawaiʻi.

In 1977, Narvaes was elected to the Hawaii House of Representatives, serving until 1983. In the same year, he was a councilman for the Honolulu City Council, serving until 1987.
