= Hiram Fong =

American politician (1906–2004)

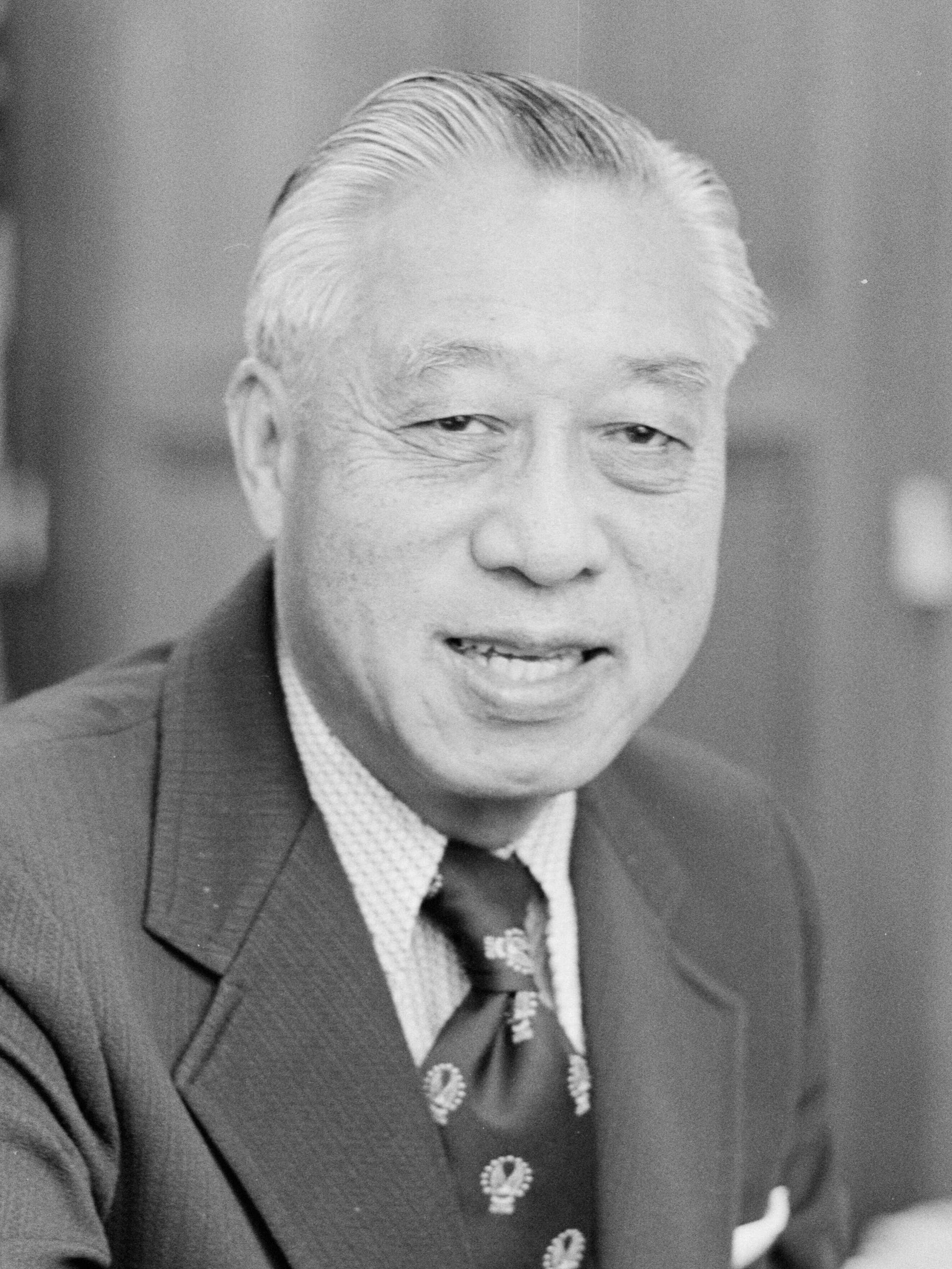
- Fong in 1976

United States Senator from Hawaii
- In office August 21, 1959 – January 3, 1977
- Preceded by: Seat established
- Succeeded by: Spark Matsunaga

Speaker of the Hawaii House of Representatives
- In office 1948–1954
- Preceded by: Manuel Paschoal
- Succeeded by: Charles E. Kauhane

Member of the Hawaii House of Representatives from the 5th district
- In office 1938–1954

Personal details
- Born: Yau Leong Fong; October 15, 1906 Honolulu, Territory of Hawaii
- Died: August 18, 2004 (aged 97) Kahaluu, Hawaii, U.S.
- Party: Republican
- Spouse: Ellyn Lo (m. 1938)
- Children: 4; including Hiram Fong Jr.
- Education: University of Hawaii, Manoa (BA); Harvard University (LLB)
- Occupation: Businessman, lawyer, politician

Military service
- Allegiance: United States
- Branch/service: United States Army
- Years of service: 1942–1945
- Rank: Major
- Unit: United States Army Air Forces • Seventh Air Force
- Battles/wars: World War II

Chinese name
- Traditional Chinese: 鄺友良
- Simplified Chinese: 邝友良
Transcriptions
Standard Mandarin
- Hanyu Pinyin: Kuàng Yǒuliáng
Yue: Cantonese
- Jyutping: Kwong^{3} Yau^{5} Leung^{4}
other Yue
- Taishanese: Fong^{1} Yiu^{4} liang^{3}

Hiram Leong Fong (born Yau Leong Fong; October 15, 1906 – August 18, 2004) was an American businessman, lawyer, and politician from Hawaii. Born to a Cantonese immigrant sugar plantation worker, Fong was one of the first two senators for Hawaii after it became the 50th US state in 1959. He was the first Chinese American and first Asian American United States Senator, serving from 1959 to 1977, and to date he remains the only Republican U.S. senator from Hawaii.

At the 1964 Republican National Convention, Fong became the first Asian American to receive delegate votes for his party's nomination for President of the United States. In the Senate, Fong supported civil rights legislation and eliminating ethnic barriers to immigration.

== Early life and education ==
Fong was born in the Honolulu neighborhood of Kalihi on the island of Oahu as the seventh of 11 children. His father, Fong Sau Howe, was of Cantonese origin (from modern day Zhuhai) and immigrated to Hawaii in 1872, along with nearly 45,000 other immigrants who would work on sugar plantations. Fong began working at age four picking beans for cattle feed, and by the age of seven was working as a shoeshiner.

Fong attended local public schools and graduated from McKinley High School in 1924. Masaji Marumoto, who went on to become the first Japanese-American Justice on the Supreme Court of Hawaii, was a classmate. In 1930, Fong obtained a degree from the University of Hawaii at Manoa, and in 1935 obtained a law degree from Harvard Law School.

== Early career ==
=== Legal and military career ===
After returning to Hawaii, Fong worked in the Office of the Prosecuting Attorney of Honolulu. In 1938, Fong went into private legal practice and founded the firm of Fong, Miho, Choy, and Robinson. In 1942, he changed his name to "Hiram", reportedly in honor of Hiram Bingham I, an early Protestant missionary in Hawaii.

During World War II, he served as a Major in the United States Army Air Forces as a Judge Advocate, later retiring as a colonel from the United States Air Force Reserve.

=== Territorial politics ===
The same year he founded his law office, Fong entered elected political life as a member of the Hawaii Territorial House of Representatives where he became Speaker of the House from 1948 to 1954. During this time, he was one of the foremost leaders in the fight to make Hawaii a state. As a territorial legislator, Fong was a delegate to the 1952 Republican National Convention.

Fong was forced into retirement when the Democratic Party of Hawaii successfully ended a Hawaii Republican Party stronghold over the Hawaii Territorial Legislature by voting most Republican incumbents out of office. Fong founded several businesses after leaving the legislature.

=== Early business ventures ===
In 1952, along with five other island families, Hiram Fong started Finance Factors, one of the first industrial and consumer loan companies, to service the growing numbers of minorities who were seeking to start new businesses and buy homes.

== United States Senate ==
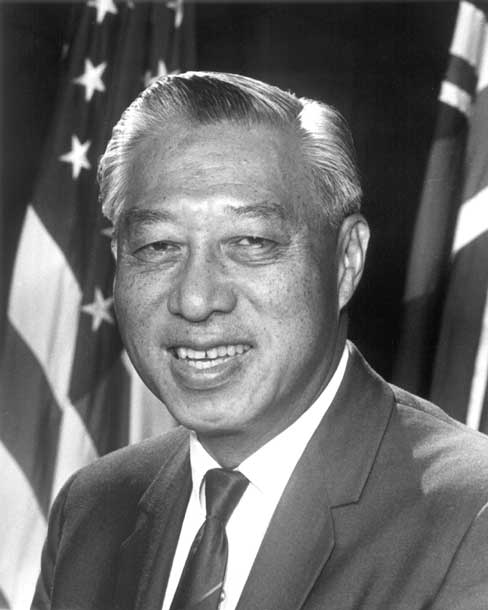
Fong earlier in his career

After Hawaii achieved statehood in 1959, Fong became one of the state's first two U.S. Senators, serving alongside popular former Governor Oren E. Long, a Democrat.

According to The Washington Post, Fong's political success can be partially attributed to the support he received from the powerful International Longshore and Warehouse Union. In office, Fong was generally regarded as a moderate Republican, voting in favor of many of President Lyndon B. Johnson's "Great Society" initiatives, such as the establishment of Medicare in 1965.

In the 1959 election, Fong won against Democrat Frank Fasi by a margin of 52.9 to 47.1%. In 1964, Fong was reelected with 53% of the vote against Democrat Thomas Gill, who received 46.4%. Fong was reelected again in 1970 by an even closer margin of 51.6 to 48.4% versus Democrat Cecil Heftel. In 1976 at the age of 70, Fong chose to retire rather than seek reelection, and was succeeded by Democrat Spark Matsunaga.

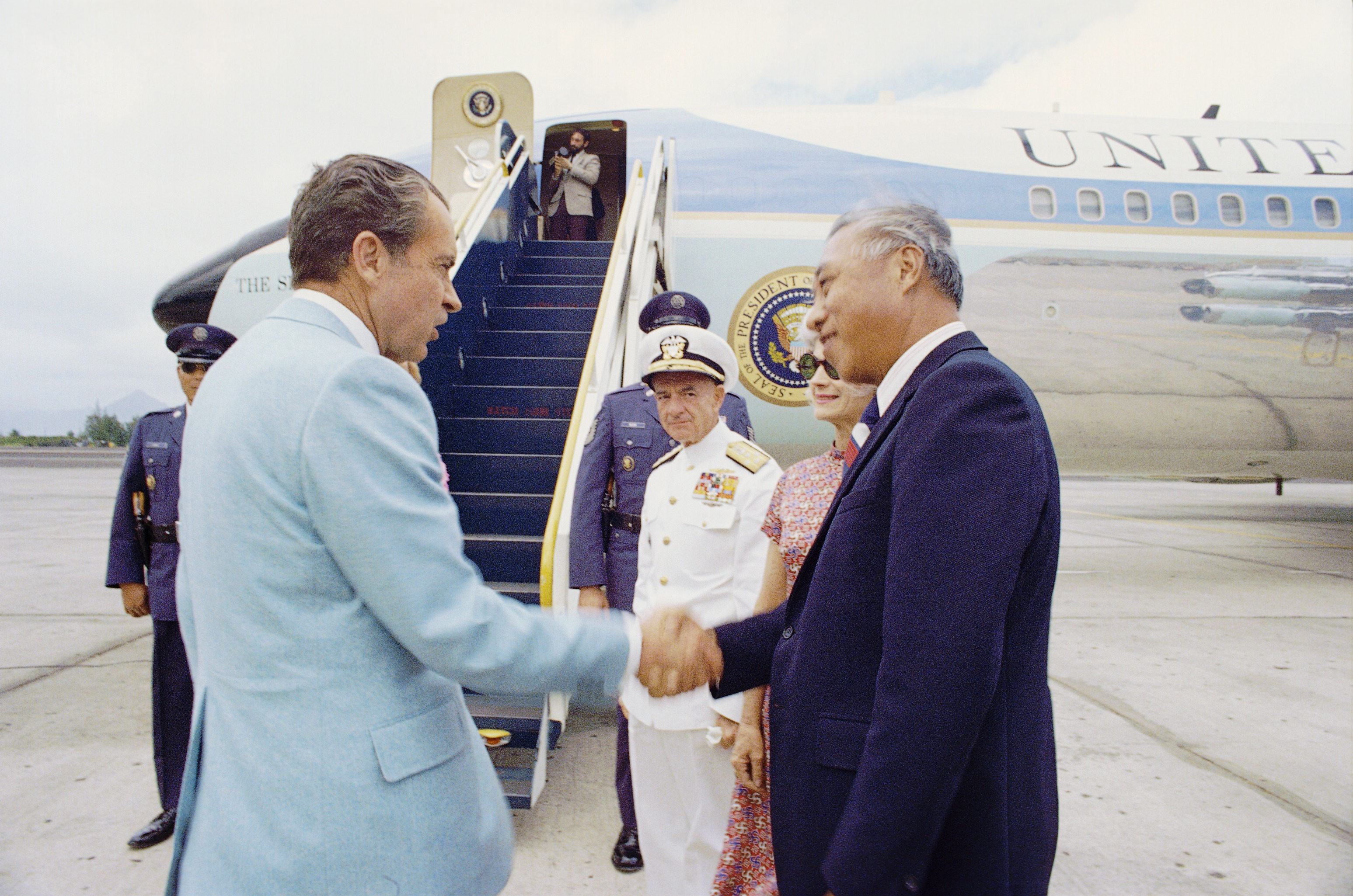
President Richard Nixon greeting Senator Fong in 1972

=== Party politics ===
Fong was twice honored as Hawaii's favorite son at the Republican National Convention in 1964 and 1968. In 1964, he became the first Asian American to receive votes for president at a major party convention, receiving the votes of the Hawaii and Alaska delegations. Fong is to date the only Republican to ever serve as a Hawaii U.S. Senator.

Fong was booed by an audience for defending George W. Romney, the Secretary of Housing and Urban Development, in the wake of a real-estate industry scandal.

In 1960, Richard Nixon remarked that "the American dream is not just a dream, it does come true – Hiram Fong's life proves it" during a visit to Hawaii.

=== Civil rights and immigration ===
Fong voted in favor of the Civil Rights Acts of 1960, 1964, and 1968, as well as the 24th Amendment to the U.S. Constitution Fong supported the Voting Rights Act of 1965, and wrote an amendment to have poll watchers safeguard the election process. Additionally, Fong voted in favor the confirmation of Thurgood Marshall to the U.S. Supreme Court.

In 1965, during debate on Immigration and Nationality Act of 1965, Fong answered questions concerning the possible change in U.S. cultural patterns by an influx of Asians:

"Asians represent six-tenths of 1 percent of the population of the United States ... concerning Japan, we estimate that there will be a total for the first 5 years of some 5,391 ... the people from that part of the world will never reach 1 percent of the population ...Our cultural pattern will never be changed as far as America is concerned." (U.S. Senate, Subcommittee on Immigration and Naturalization of the Committee on the Judiciary, Washington, D.C., February 10, 1965, pp.71, 119.)

=== Foreign policy ===
During Nixon's presidency, Fong was a vocal supporter of the Vietnam War, which reportedly left many Asian-American constituents displeased. According to the Honolulu Star-Bulletin, Fong's support for the Vietnam War led to him losing votes in the 1970 election, his last reelection campaign.

== Personal life and legacy ==
Fong married Ellyn Lo in 1938; they had four children. After retiring from the Senate, Fong faced financial and legal difficulties, including several lawsuits with a son over the family's businesses that forced him and his wife to declare bankruptcy in 2003. They managed a botanical garden of 725 acres (293 ha) that was opened to the public in 1988.

On August 18, 2004, Hiram Fong died of kidney failure at his home in Honolulu; he was the last living former U.S. senator born in the 1900s decade.

Fong was a Congregationalist and was buried in Nuuanu Memorial Park and Mortuary in Honolulu.

=== Papers ===
Fong's papers were donated to the University of Hawaii at Manoa Library in August 1998. Fong also provided financial support to the preservation and inventorying of over a thousand boxes, crates, and trunks of documents. Within them included papers, photos, videos, and memorabilia from Fong's congressional tenure and pre-political life, including law-school notes. Included in the collection are series of Washington, D.C., and Hawaii office files, Post Office and Civil Service Committee (POCS) materials, and political souvenirs.

Approximately 80 boxes of books accompanied Fong's papers, several dedicated his work on Senate committees such as the POCS. A few of the books were kept with the congressional collection, though the majority were added to the university library. A gift book plate was designed for these incorporating the senator's noted signature. The papers were processed in 2003 by archivist Dee Hazelrigg, and are available to researchers by appointment.

== See also ==
- List of Asian Americans and Pacific Islander Americans in the United States Congress
- List of Harvard University politicians

Party political offices
First	Republican nominee for U.S. Senator from Hawaii (Class 1); 1959, 1964, 1970	Succeeded by William Quinn
U.S. Senate
New seat	U.S. Senator (Class 1) from Hawaii; 1959–1977; Served alongside: Oren Long, Daniel Inouye	Succeeded by Spark Matsunaga
Preceded by Frank Carlson	Ranking Member of the Senate Post Office and Civil Service Committee; 1969–1977	Position abolished
Preceded by Winston Prouty	Ranking Member of the Senate Aging Committee; 1971–1977	Succeeded by Pete Domenici
Honorary titles
Preceded by Strom Thurmond	Oldest Living United States Senator; Sitting or Former; 2003–2004	Succeeded by Clifford Hansen
