= John T. Ushijima =

American politician

Member of the Hawaii Senate
- In office 1959–1982

President of the Hawaii Senate
- In office 1975–1978
- Preceded by: David C. McClung
- Succeeded by: Richard S.H. Wong

Personal details
- Born: March 13, 1924 Hilo, Hawaii, U.S.
- Died: August 13, 2006 (aged 82)
- Party: Republican; Democratic
- Education: Grinnell College; George Washington University Law School

John T. Ushijima (March 13, 1924 – August 13, 2006) was an American politician. He served as a member of the Hawaii Senate.

== Life and career ==
Ushijima was born in Hilo, Hawaii. During the Second World War he served in Europe with the 442nd Regimental Combat Team. After the War, he attended Grinnell College and George Washington University Law School.

Ushijima served in the Hawaii Senate from Hawaii's first post-statehood election in 1959 until his retirement in 1982. Ushijima rose through the ranks, becoming Assistant Majority Leader for 1963–1964, Senate Vice President for 1971–1974, and Senate President for 1975–1978, while also chairing several Senate committees along the way. While in the Senate, Ushijima supported legislation on health care, housing, and non-discrimination. During the 1970s he also supported decriminalization of marijuana, saying that "The enforcement of a statute against a victimless act is impossible".

Ushijima later served on the Board of Regents for the state-wide University of Hawaii system.

While Ushijima was at times attested to be the brother of his fellow Hilo-based legislator, State Representative Charles T. Ushijima, other sources listed them as having separate parents.

Ushijima died on August 13, 2006, at the age of 82.
