= David S. Chang =

American politician (born 1980)

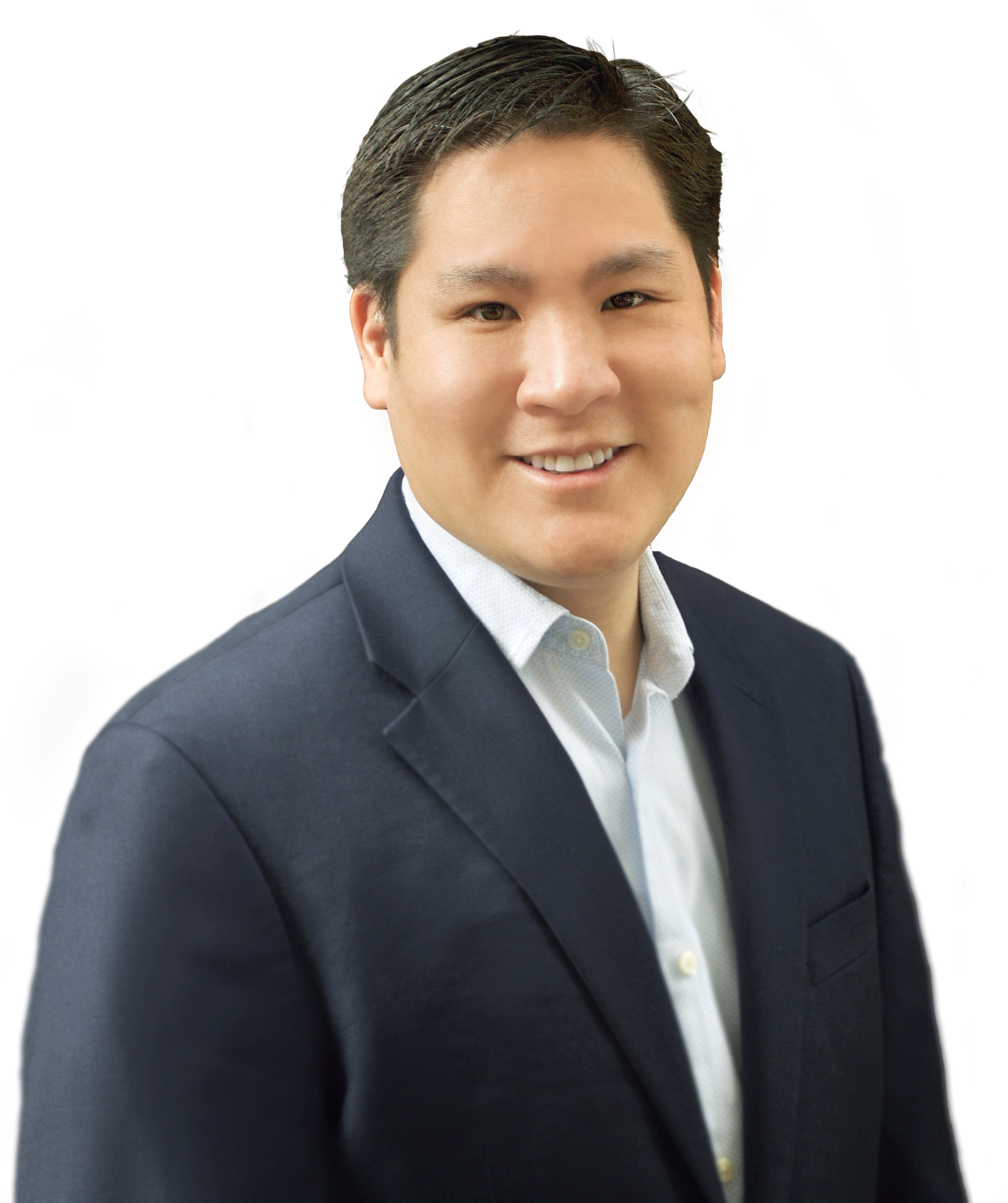

Chairman of the Hawaii Republican Party
- In office November 8, 2011 – March 19, 2014
- Preceded by: Beth Fukumoto (Acting)
- Succeeded by: Pat Saiki

Personal details
- Born: David Sung Yeul Chang; January 4, 1980 (age 46) Sacramento, California, U.S.
- Party: Republican
- Spouse: Beth Fukumoto (m. 2012; div. 2017)
- Education: United States Military Academy (BS); University of Hawaii, Manoa (MA); Covenant Theological Seminary (MA); University of California, Los Angeles (MBA)
- Occupation: Entrepreneur and CEO, Wealth Manager, Chief Editor, Former Chair of the Hawaii Republican Party, Hawaii Army National Guard Military Intelligence Officer
- Website: www.changholding.com

David Sung Yeul Chang (born January 4, 1980) is a Korean-American political figure, military combat veteran, entrepreneur and CEO, keynote speaker and editor of The Art of Thinking Smart, based in Honolulu, Hawaii. He is the chairman and CEO of Chang Holding Company Incorporated, a military intelligence officer in the Hawaii Army National Guard, and is the former chairman of the Hawaii Republican Party and the Republican National Committee. Chang was elected chair in November 2011 for the 2011–2013 term and re-elected for another two-year term in May 2013, but resigned in March 2014, before the end of his term. In 2017, David S. Chang was under federal investigation and later reached a settlement with the Security Exchange Commission in 2020 and lost his ability to serve as a financial advisor.Settlement between SEC & David S Chang

== Early life ==
Chang was born in Sacramento, California, and is a graduate of the United States Military Academy at West Point with a Bachelor of Science in Economics and Computer Science. After West Point, Chang was selected as an East-West Graduate Degree Fellow and attended the University of Hawaii at Manoa where he graduated with a Masters in Arts in Political Science, with a specialty in Asian Politics. He received a Leadership Certificate from the East-West Center and received his master's degree in Theological Studies from Covenant Theological Seminary.

Chang is a second generation Korean-American.

== Political life ==
=== 2010 Campaign for State Representative for the 28th District ===
In 2010, Chang ran for State Representative for the 28th District (Palama, Chinatown, Downtown, Lower Makiki, Sheridan) as a Republican. Chang was unopposed for the primary election and received 597 (77.5%) votes. In the general election on November 2, 2010, Chang lost to incumbent Democrat Karl Rhoads by 3,203 (52.3%) to 2,636 (43%) votes.

On September 23, 2010, Lynne Matusow and Anthony Chang filed a lawsuit against Scott Nago, In His Official Capacity as Chief Election Officer of the State of Hawaii Office of Elections, and Chang alleging that Chang was not a resident of the 28th Representative District at the time he filed papers to run and therefore should be disqualified from the November 2010 general election. A similar challenge to the Office of Elections in August 2010 had failed. On December 7, 2010, after the general election, the court granted the defendants' motion summary judgment and subsequently granted judgment in favor of Nago and Chang.

=== Tenure as State Chair of the Hawaii Republican Party ===
On November 5, 2011, in an uncontested election, Chang was unanimously elected by the Republican party's state committee to the unpaid position of State Party Chair of the Hawaii Republican Party, to fill the remainder of the 2011–2013 term previously held by Jonah Kaauwai.

The party's state committee is made up of 51 elected House District chairpersons, 4 county chairs, executive committee members and Republican leaders in the Hawaii State House and Senate. At the time, Chang was 31 years old, making him the youngest person in the country to ever to assume the position of state party chair.

In an email message to State Committee members prior to the election, Chang wrote "As chair, I will devote my efforts to growing our membership, raising funds for the party and our candidates, and recruiting strong candidates for 2012." However, his 2011-2014 tenure as State Party Chair was marked with decreased monetary contributions to the Hawaii Republican Party, a decrease in Republican candidates to legislative seats, and the net loss of one Republican seat in the legislature.

Under Chang, total contributions to the Hawaii Republican party decreased nearly in half from $1,116,426.98 in the previous two-year period (January 1, 2009, to December, 31, 2010) to $575,537.63 during the January 1, 2011, to December 31, 2012, period. Contributions also fell again for the January 1, 2013, to December, 31, 2014, period to $518,386.10.

Under Chang, Republicans failed to field candidates for more legislative races than the previous election. In 2010, under the previous chair, Republicans fielded candidates in 63 of the total 66 (95%) races for state Senate and House of Representative seats. In 2012, under Chang, Republicans fielded candidates in 49 of the total 71 (64%) races for state Senate and House of Representative seats. For the 2012 general election, two incumbent Republicans (George Fontaine and Corinne Ching) lost elections to Democrats and one Republican, his then-wife Beth Fukumoto, defeated an incumbent Democrat, for a net loss of one state House of Representatives seat. The number of Republicans in the state Senate did not change due to the 2012 election.

Federal races for the United States Senate and House of Representatives were unsuccessful. Republican candidate Linda Lingle received 160,994 votes (36.8%) in her loss to Democrat Mazie Hirono's 269,489 (61.6%) votes for United States senator This result contrasted with the 2002 Hawaii Governor election where Lingle defeated Hirono by 197,009 (51.6%) to 179,647 (46.6%) votes. Democrat Colleen Hanabusa also defeated former congressman Republican Charles Djou by 116,505 (53.5%) to 96,824 (44.4%) votes and Democrat Tulsi Gabbard defeated Republican Kawika Crowley 168,503 (76.8%) to 40,707 (18.6%) votes in the two races for United States Representative for Hawaii.

Despite the results of the 2012 election, in December 2012, Chang was selected by Campaigns & Elections Magazine as one of the five Republicans for Hawaii's Top 10 Influencers of the 2012 Elections.

Due to his position as chair, Chang served as a superdelegate to the 2012 Republican National Convention.

In March 2013, Chang traveled to Seoul, Korea for an appearance with former American President George W. Bush.

On May 18, 2013, Chang was reelected to a second term to run 2013–2015. On the same day, Chang stated that during his first term, the party moved from being $110,000 in debt to posting a modest surplus and that the party attracted 5,000 new members and 1,000 new donors.

In March 2014, before the end of his 2013–2015 term, Chang stepped down as Chair citing his desire to concentrate on his military and business commitments. The Honolulu Star Advertiser noted that during Chang's tenure, the fortunes of the Hawaii Republican Party had fallen, the two most electable Hawaii Republican candidates had lost elections, and that the Republican party had lost ground in the state legislature.

== Professional life ==
=== Military ===
Upon graduation from the United States Military Academy at West Point, New York, as a member of the Bicentennial Class of 2002, Chang was commissioned a second lieutenant in the United States Army as an armor officer. After finishing graduate school, he attended the Armor Officer Basic Course and was assigned to the 3d Regiment, 4th Cavalry Squadron, 25th Aviation Regiment, 25th Infantry Division at Schofield Barracks, Hawaii, as a ground scout platoon leader, assistant intelligence officer (S2), and assistant operations officer (S3).

He then branch detailed to Military Intelligence and attended the Military Intelligence Tactician Course. He served as the battalion intelligence officer (S2) for 3d Battalion, 25th Aviation Regiment, and the deputy brigade intelligence officer (S2) for the 25th Combat Aviation Brigade. He is a veteran of Operation Iraqi Freedom 06-08 and served 15 months in Northern Iraq. He joined the Hawaii Army National Guard in 2009 and has served in the Joint Forces Headquarters and 103d Troop Command as an intelligence officer. He was selected as the company commander for Military Intelligence Company (MICO) B Company, 29th Brigade Support Battalion, 29th Infantry Brigade Combat Team, and the brigade intelligence officer (S2) for the 29th Brigade Combat Team. He currently serves as the vice chief of staff of intelligence (J2) for the Hawaii Army National Guard.

=== Business ===
Chang is the chairman and CEO of Hawaii-based investment firm Chang Holding Company, which currently comprises WealthBridge Inc., Home Care Solutions and Care for Life, WealthBridge Real Estate and Development LLC, GreenTech Pacific LLC, and Pacific West Imports and Export. He founded Chang Holding Company in 2010 and is based out of Honolulu, Hawaii. In 2015 Chang was selected by Investments News 40 Under 40 financial professionals in the financial industry. WealthBridge Inc., was selected as a FIVE-STAR Wealth Manager for the State of Hawaii in 2015, 2014, 2013, 2012 and 2011. WealthBridge Inc. was selected by The National Association of Board Certified Advisory Practices (NABCAP) as a Premier Advisor for 2014, 2013 and 2012.

He was selected as a member of The Top 40 Under 40 Military Class of 2013. In 2011, Pacific Edge Magazine selected Chang as Young Professional of the Year. In 2010, he was selected as the Business Leader of the Year from the Pacific Business News 2010 class of Forty Under 40 in Hawaii. In 2011, he was a finalist for The Business Leadership Hawaii American Savings Bank Business Leader of the Year.

Chang currently has a blog called The Art of Thinking SMART and The Art of SMART Money, and the.

== Personal life ==
Chang received his MBA from the UCLA Anderson School of Management and is an alumnus of the Goldman Sachs 10,000 Small Businesses Program and received a Certificate in Entrepreneurship from Babson College. Chang also earned a Certificate of Leadership from the East-West Center and was selected as an East-West Graduate Degree Fellow.

Chang is a past chair and member of the steering committee for the Young Professionals program of The Chamber of Commerce of Hawaii. Chang is also involved with local church ministries and teaches at an 8,000 member church.
