= Vince Dao =

American influencer and political commentator

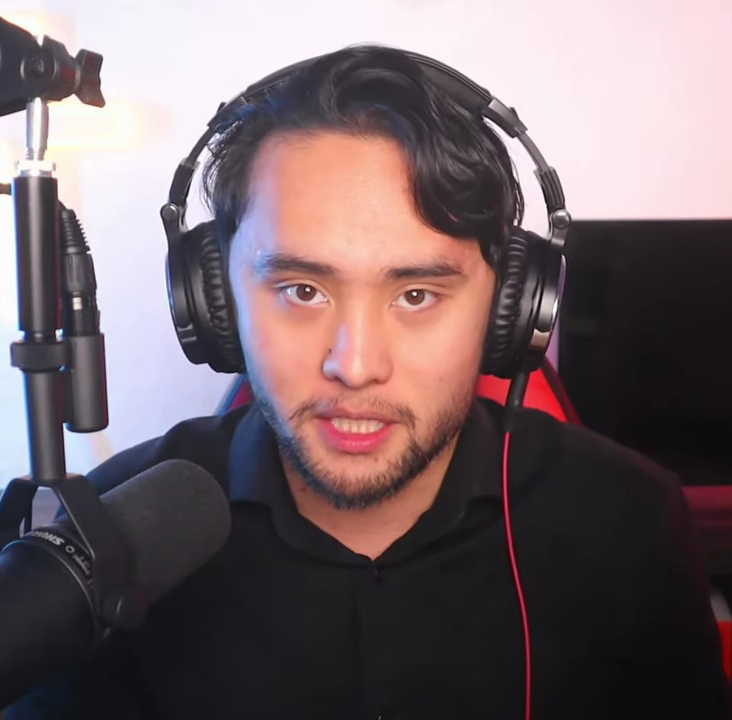
- Dao in 2023
- Born: Los Angeles, California, U.S.
- Education: University of Florida
- Occupations: Social media personality; political commentator
- Years active: 2019–present
- Organizations: American Virtue; American Populist Union (former)
- Political party: Republican

Instagram information
- Page: thevincedao
- Years active: 2017–present
- Followers: 228,000

YouTube information
- Channel: Vince Dao
- Genre: Podcast
- Subscribers: 536,000
- Views: 266.92 million
- Last updated: November 20, 2025

Vince Dao is an American conservative political commentator and social media personality. His promotion of conservatism brought him media recognition. He is the former leader of American Populist Union.

== Early life and education ==
Dao is from Los Angeles, California and is of Vietnamese and Italian descent. During his high school graduation, Dao was honored as the valedictorian of his graduating class. Initially a progressive, he shifted towards conservatism after watching Tucker Carlson on Fox News while working on a school project.

Dao graduated from the University of Florida as an undergraduate.

== Career ==
Vince Dao is a political conservative. He is a social media influencer and political commentator, and was a founding member and chief spokesperson of the American Populist Union (now called American Virtue), known for promoting social conservatism, and populist economic views. Dao began by gaining a following on platforms like Instagram and Youtube, where he defends Christian views on marriage, questions foreign interventions by the United States (including against the former country of South Vietnam in 1963), and advocates for a more active role of Christianity in the American policy-making process. He specializes in producing online media content, interviews, public speaking, podcasts, short videos and organizing gatherings, and has shared the stage with Republican political figures Don Huffines, Anthony Sabatini, and Michael Knowles. He has been a guest speaker at Emory University, Tom Shattuck's Burn Barrel, The Daily Wire, Turning Point USA, BlazeTV, Newsmax, and OAN. Additionally, he currently serves as the host of the Freedom Broadcasting Network's program "National Conservative," on The Roku Channel. He was also featured on Vice News.

Dao's former organization, The American Populist Union has been accused of attempting to sabotage Turning Point USA, alongside the Groypers. He has criticized academic administrator Ben Sasse, as "not being conservative enough."

== See also ==
- Bull Moose Project
