= Wing Kong Chong =

American politician (1916–2006)

Member of the Hawaii House of Representatives
- In office 1971–1975

Personal details
- Born: August 14, 1916
- Died: April 25, 2006 (aged 89)
- Party: Republican
- Spouse: Ethel R. Ishii (m. 1948)
- Education: University of Hawaii; Miami University; Columbia University

Wing Kong Chong (August 14, 1916 – April 25, 2006) was an American educator and politician. He served as a Republican member of the Hawaii House of Representatives from 1970 to 1974 and as a member of the Board of Supervisors of Hawaii County from 1960 to 1962 and 1966 to 1968.

== Early life and education ==
Chong was born on August 14, 1916 in Hilo, Hawaii. His father was an immigrant from China and he grew up as one of ten children in a large family. The neighborhood he grew up in was nicknamed "Chongville" after his father. Chong graduated from Hilo High School in 1936 and initially attended the University of Hawaii before transferring to Miami University on a scholarship. While attending Miami University, he was a member of Tau Kappa Alpha and so impressed the school's president, Alfred Upham, that his tuition for his final year of school was waived. He graduated with a bachelor's degree in 1940. Initially planning on studying medicine, he realized it would be cost-prohibitive and opted to instead study education at Columbia University, earning a master's degree in 1941.

== Career ==
After graduating from Columbia, Cong returned to Hawaii and taught at several schools, including his alma mater Hilo High School. He later worked in the insurance industry for American Mutual and as a farmer.

From 1960 to 1962 and 1966 to 1968, Chong was a member of the Board of Supervisors of Hawaii County. He was briefly acting chairman of the board in 1962. Chong served in the Hawaii House of Representatives from 1971 to 1975.

== Elections ==
Cong first ran for elected office in 1959, unsuccessfully seeking a seat in the Hawaii Senate. The following year he ran for the Board of Supervisors of Hawaii County as a Republican. He won the election with 8,490 votes. In 1962 Chong ran for election to the County Chairman position but lost. He again ran for the Board of Supervisors in 1966, winning election. He lost his bid for re-election in 1968.

In 1970, Chong was elected to the Hawaii House of Representatives for the 2nd District. The win was described by the Hawaii Tribune-Herald as an upset, with Chong winning by only 218 votes. He was reelected in 1972. Chong ran for mayor of Hawaii County twice, once in 1972 and once in 1974. He lost both elections to Herbert Matayoshi.

== Personal life ==
Chong married Ethel Ishii in 1948. The pair had two sons and one daughter. Chong was an active member of the Boy Scouts for much of his life. He died on April 25, 2006.
