= List of foreign politicians of Indian origin =

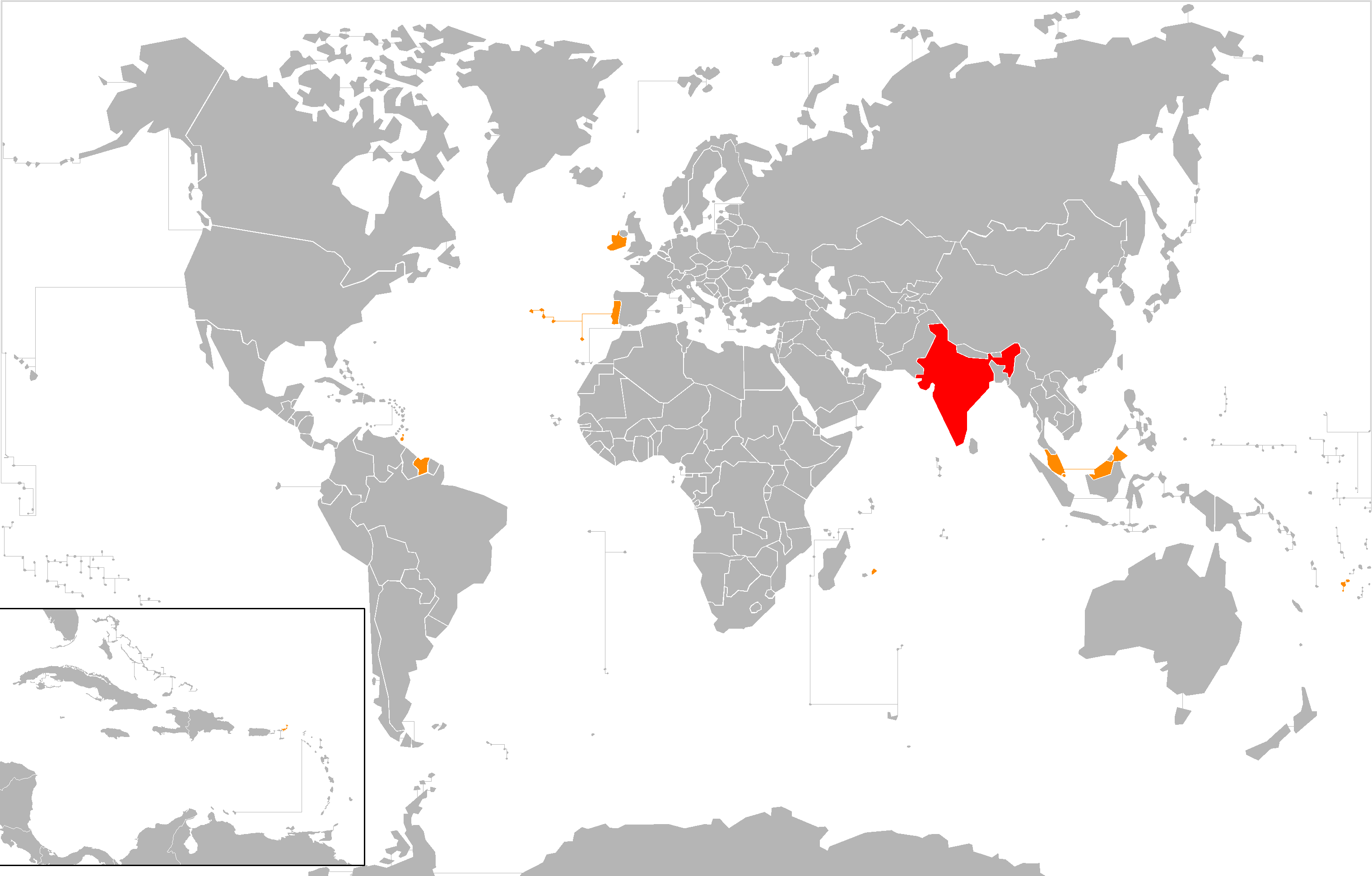
Countries with heads of state or government of Indian descent (past or present) as of 2017

This article contains a list of Wikipedia articles about politicians in countries outside of the Indian subcontinent who are of Indian origin.

== Australia ==
=== Federal parliament ===
- Christabel Chamarette – Greens Senator for Western Australia (1992-1996)
- Varun Ghosh – Labor Senator for Western Australia (2024-)
- Zaneta Mascarenhas – Labor MP for Swan (2022-)
- Lisa Singh – Labor Senator for Tasmania (2011-2019)
- Dave Sharma – Liberal MP for Wentworth (2019-2022) and Senator for New South Wales (2023-)

=== State and territory parliaments ===
- June D'Rozario – Northern Territory Labor MLA
- Deepak-Raj Gupta – Australian Capital Territory Labor MLA
- Jags Krishnan – Western Australia Labor MLA
- Kevin Michel – Western Australia Labor MLA
- Daniel Mookhey – New South Wales Labor MLC
- Lauren Moss – Northern Territory Labor MLA
- Yaz Mubarakai – Western Australia Labor MLA
- Gurmesh Singh – New South Wales National MP
- Kaushaliya Vaghela – Victoria Labor MLC
- Anne Warner – Queensland Labor MLA

== Canada ==
=== Federal ===
- Anita Anand – Liberal MP
- Chandra Arya – former Liberal MP
- Hardial Bains – founder and former leader of the Communist Party of Canada (Marxist–Leninist)
- Navdeep Bains – former Liberal MP
- Parm Bains – Liberal MP
- Jag Bhaduria – former Liberal MP
- Andrew Cardozo – Progressive Senate Group Senator
- Bardish Chagger - Liberal MP
- George Chahal – former Liberal MP
- Joe Daniel – former Conservative MP
- Herb Dhaliwal – former Liberal MP; first Indo-Canadian cabinet minister
- Sukh Dhaliwal – Liberal MP
- Ruby Dhalla – former Liberal MP
- Anju Dhillon – Liberal MP
- Baltej Singh Dhillon – Independent Senators Group Senator
- Iqwinder Gaheer – Liberal MP
- Amanpreet Gill – Conservative MP
- Amarjeet Gill – Conservative MP
- Dalwinder Gill – Conservative MP
- Harb Gill – Conservative MP
- Parm Gill – former Conservative MP
- Sukhman Gill – Conservative MP
- Baljit Gosal – former Conservative MP and Minister of State for Sports
- Gurmant Grewal – former Conservative MP, half (with Nina, listed below) of the first married couple to serve as MPs in the same session of Parliament
- Nina Grewal – former Conservative MP, half (with Gurmant) of the first married couple to serve as MPs in the same session of Parliament
- Raj Grewal – former Liberal MP
- Mobina Jaffer – former Independent Senators Group Senator
- Rahim Jaffer – former Conservative MP
- Gigi Osler – Canadian Senators Group Senator
- Jasraj Singh Hallan – Conservative MP
- Darshan Kang – former Liberal MP
- Arpan Khanna – Conservative MP
- Kamal Khera – former Liberal MP
- Vim Kochhar – former Conservative Senator
- Jagsharan Singh Mahal – Conservative MP
- Shuvaloy Majumdar – Conservative MP
- Gurbax Singh Malhi – former Liberal MP
- Sabi Marwah – former Independent Senators Group Senator
- Sachit Mehra – president of the Liberal Party of Canada
- Farah Mohamed – Independent Senators Group Senator
- Taleeb Noormohamed – Liberal MP
- Deepak Obhrai – former Conservative MP
- Ratna Omidvar – former Independent Senators Group Senator
- Yasmin Ratansi – former Liberal MP
- Mohamed-Iqbal Ravalia – Independent Senators Group Senator
- Jag Sahota – former Conservative MP
- Ruby Sahota – Liberal MP
- Jasbir Sandhu – former NDP MP
- Gurbux Saini – Liberal MP
- Raj Saini – former Liberal MP
- Harjit Singh Sajjan – former Liberal MP and Minister of National Defense
- Ramesh Sangha – former Liberal MP
- Randeep Sarai – Liberal MP
- Bob Saroya – former Conservative MP
- Asha Seth – former Conservative Senator
- Devinder Shory – former Conservative MP
- Maninder Sidhu – Liberal MP
- Sonia Sidhu – Liberal MP
- Gagan Sikand – former Liberal MP
- Jinny Sims – former NDP MP
- Jagmeet Singh – former leader of the New Democratic Party; first person of Indian descent to be elected leader of a prominent party at the national level in North America, former NDP MP, and former Ontario NDP MPP
- Amandeep Sodhi – Liberal MP
- Tim Uppal – Conservative MP
- Arif Virani – former Liberal MP
- Hassan Yussuff – Independent Senator

=== Provincial/Territorial ===
- Bharat Agnihotri – former Alberta Liberal MLA
- Leela Aheer – former Alberta UCP MLA
- Prab Gill – former Alberta UCP MLA
- Devinder Toor – former Alberta UCP MLA
- Prasad Panda – former Alberta Wildrose MLA
- Deepak Anand – Ontario Progressive Conservative MPP
- Anjali Appadurai – former candidate for leader of the British Columbia NDP
- Rohini Arora – British Columbia NDP MLA
- Harry Bains – former British Columbia NDP MLA
- Bas Balkissoon – former Ontario Liberal MPP
- Harman Bhangu – British Columbia Conservative MLA
- Harry Sohal – former Alberta Progressive Conservative MLA
- Naresh Bhardwaj – former Alberta Progressive Conservative MLA
- Manmeet Bhullar – former Alberta Progressive Conservative MLA
- Parmeet Singh Boparai – Alberta NDP MLA
- Bhajan Brar – Saskatchewan NDP MLA
- Diljeet Brar – Manitoba NDP MLA
- Gurtej Singh Brar – Alberta NDP MLA
- Gurinder Brar – Alberta NDP MLA
- Gulzar Singh Cheema – former British Columbia Liberal MLA and Manitoba Liberal MLA
- Raj Chouhan – British Columbia NDP MLA
- Dipika Damerla – former Ontario Liberal MPP
- Jasvir Deol – Alberta NDP MLA
- Jasdeep Devgan – Manitoba NDP MLA
- Mandeep Dhaliwal – British Columbia Conservative MLA
- Vic Dhillon – former Ontario Liberal MPP
- Sunita Dhir – British Columbia NDP MLA
- Ujjal Dosanjh – former Premier of British Columbia; first Indo-Canadian premier; former federal Minister of Health; former NDP MLA and Liberal MP
- Raminder Gill – former Ontario Progressive Conservative MPP and federal Conservative candidate
- Hardeep Grewal – Ontario Progressive Conservative MPP
- Tajinder Grewal – Saskatchewan NDP MLA
- Sindi Hawkins – former British Columbia Liberal MLA
- Dave Hayer – former British Columbia Liberal MLA
- Kash Heed – former British Columbia Liberal MLA
- Bidhu Jha – former Manitoba NDP MLA
- Jas Johal – former British Columbia Liberal MLA
- Ravi Kahlon – British Columbia NDP MLA
- Kuldip Singh Kular – former Ontario Liberal MPP
- Salma Lakhani – Lieutenant Governor of Alberta
- Harry Lali – former British Columbia NDP MLA
- Harinder Malhi – former Ontario Liberal MPP
- Amrit Mangat – former Ontario Liberal MPP
- Indira Naidoo-Harris – former Ontario Liberal MPP
- Rob Nijjar – former British Columbia Liberal MLA
- Wally Oppal – former British Columbia Liberal MLA
- Rakhi Pancholi – Alberta NDP MLA
- Samir Kayande – Alberta NDP MLA
- Raj Pannu – former leader of the Alberta New Democrats; first Indo-Canadian leader of a political party, former Alberta NDP MLA
- Ravi Parmar – British Columbia NDP MLA
- Ranj Pillai – former premier of Yukon and former Yukon Liberal MLA
- Shiraz Shariff – former Alberta Progressive Conservative MLA
- Leonard Preyra – former Nova Scotia NDP MLA
- Mohinder Saran – former Manitoba NDP MLA
- Amna Shah – British Columbia NDP MLA
- Jessie Sunner – British Columbia NDP MLA
- Aman Singh – former British Columbia NDP MLA
- Amrik Virk – former British Columbia Liberal MLA
- Tony Bhullar – former British Columbia Liberal MLA
- John Nuraney – former British Columbia Liberal MLA
- Karn Manhas – former British Columbia Liberal MLA
- Jody Toor – British Columbia Conservative MLA
- Steve Kooner – British Columbia Conservative MLA
- Moe Sihota – former British Columbia NDP MLA and television host
- Harinder Takhar – former Ontario Liberal MPP and Minister of Transportation
- Patty Sahota – former British Columbia Liberal MLA
- Amarjot Sandhu – Ontario Progressive Conservative MPP
- Harwinder Sandhu – British Columbia NDP MLA
- Mintu Sandhu – Manitoba NDP MLA
- Peter Sandhu – former Alberta Progressive Conservative MLA
- Prabmeet Sarkaria – Ontario Progressive Conservative MPP
- Rajan Sawhney – Alberta UCP MLA
- Adil Shamji – Ontario Liberal MPP
- Niki Sharma – British Columbia NDP MLA
- Raj Sherman – former Alberta Liberal leader and MLA
- Gurratan Singh – former Ontario NDP MPP
- Peter Singh – Alberta UCP MLA
- Rachna Singh – former British Columbia NDP MLA
- Sara Singh – former Ontario NDP MPP
- Tania Sodhi – New Brunswick Liberal MLA
- Nina Tangri – Ontario Progressive Conservative MPP
- Murad Velshi – former Ontario Liberal MPP
- Judi Tyabji – former British Columbia Progressive Democratic Alliance MLA

=== Municipal ===
- Johnder Basran – former Mayor of Lillooet
- Jyoti Gondek – Mayor of Calgary
- Parthi Kandavel – Toronto City Councillor
- Naheed Nenshi – former Mayor of Calgary
- Amarjeet Sohi – Mayor of Edmonton

== Fiji ==
- Mahendra Chaudhry – first Indo-Fijian Prime Minister (1999–2000)
- Ahmed Ali (1938–2005) – several times a cabinet minister
- George Shiu Raj – Cabinet Minister
- Anand Singh – Fiji Labour Party Senator and former Attorney-General
- Vijay R. Singh – former Cabinet Minister
- Sidiq Koya – Leader of the Opposition National Federation Party
- Dorsami Naidu – Leader of the National Federation Party
- A. D. Patel (1905–1969)- founder of the National Federation Party
- Pramod Rae – General Secretary of the National Federation Party
- Jai Ram Reddy – Leader of the National Federation Party (1977–1987; 1992–1999); judge
- Prem Singh – former NFP leader
- Raman Pratap Singh – National Federation Party leader
- Ram Jati Singh – NFP politician
- Amjad Ali – FLP politician
- Anand Babla – FLP politician
- Pratap Chand – FLP politician
- Gaffar Ahmed – FLP politician
- Gunasagaran Gounder – FLP politician
- Hafiz Khan – businessman and Senator
- James Shri Krishna – FLP politician
- Prince Gopal Lakshman – FLP politician
- Surendra Lal – FLP politician
- Sanjeet Chand Maharaj – FLP politician
- Perumal Mupnar – FLP Member of Parliament
- Shivlal Nagindas – Labasa businessman and former Senator
- Damodaran Nair – FLP Member of Parliament
- Gyani Nand – FLP politician
- Ragho Nand – FLP politician
- Udit Narayan – FLP politician
- Krishna Prasad – FLP Member of Parliament
- Ram Sharan – FLP politician
- Gyan Singh – FLP Member of Parliament
- Pravin Singh – FLP Member of Parliament
- Satendra Singh – FLP politician
- Lekh Ram Vayeshnoi – Fiji Labour Party parliamentarian

== Germany ==
- Ashok-Alexander Sridharan – Mayor of Bonn

== Guyana ==
- Dale Bisnauth
- Ronald Gajraj
- Cheddi Jagan – 4th President of Guyana (1992-1997)
- Bharrat Jagdeo – 7th Prime Minister (1999) and 7th President (1999-2011)
- Samuel Insanally
- Joey Jagan
- Edward Luckhoo
- Lionel Luckhoo – politician, diplomat, and lawyer
- Donald Ramotar – 8th President (2011-2015)
- Moses Nagamootoo – 8th Prime Minister of Guyana (2015-2020)
- Irfaan Ali – 10th President (2020–present)
- Peter Ramsaroop
- Shridath Ramphal – Commonwealth Secretary General (1975-1990)
- Rupert Roopnaraine

== Indonesia ==
- Harbrinderjit Singh Dillon
- Musa "Ijeck" Rajekshah – Vice Governor of North Sumatra (2018-2023)

== Ireland ==
- Leo Varadkar – Taoiseach (2017–2020; 2022-2024)

== Jamaica ==
- Kamala-Jean Gopie

== Japan ==
- Yogendra Puranik

== Kenya ==
- Chunilal Madan – legislator and Chief Justice of Kenya
- Sunjeev Kour Birdi – Member of Parliament
- Alibhai Mulla Jeevanjee – merchant, politician and philanthropist
- Pio Gama Pinto – journalist, politician and freedom fighter
- Fitz Remedios Santana de Souza

== Malaysia ==
- V. David – politician
- K. L. Devaser – fourth president of the Malaysian Indian Congress
- P. Kamalanathan – Member of Parliament Hulu Selangor and Deputy Minister, Ministry of Education; Central Working Committee Member of the Malaysian Indian Congress; founding member of PUTERA MIC
- Datuk M. Kayveas – president of PPP and deputy minister
- Devaki Krishnan – first Malaysian Indian woman to become a municipal councillor
- Tan Sri Devaki Krishnan – former politician
- Tan Sri V. Manickavasagam – sixth president of the Malaysian Indian Congress and former Minister of Communication
- M. Manoharan – former member of the Selangor State Legislative Assembly; known for his involvement with HINDRAF
- K. S. Nijhar – Member of Parliament
- Datuk G. Palanivel – Deputy Minister of Women and Family Development and deputy president of Malaysian Indian Congress
- Tan Sri M. G. Pandithan – founding President of the Indian Progressive Front (IPF)
- K. Parthiban – state assemblyman for Ijok (2007–2008)
- Datuk K. Pathmanaban – politician and former Deputy Minister of Labour and founder of Melaka Manipal Medical College
- Sivarasa Rasiah – human rights lawyer and vice-president of the opposition Parti Keadilan Rakyat (People's Justice Party)
- Tun V. T. Sambanthan – one of the founding fathers of independent Malaya and Founder of National Land Finance Co-op.(NLFCS).
- D. R. Seenivasagam – founder of PPP and politician
- Kula Segaran – MP for Ipoh Barat and DAP National Vice Chairman
- Karpal Singh – chairman of opposition Democratic Action Party and member of parliament
- Datuk K. Sivalingam – former member of the state executive council of Selangor
- John Thivy – freedom fighter and founding president of the Malayan Indian Congress
- E. E. C. Thuraisingham – politician of pre-Independence Malaysia
- Tan Sri G. Vadiveloo – former Speaker of the Senate
- Datuk Seri Samy Vellu – Works Minister in the Malaysian cabinet and president of the Malaysian Indian Congress

== Mauritius ==
- Sookdeo Bissoondoyal – politician and one of the three founding fathers of independent Mauritius
- Dayendranath Burrenchobay – Governor-General of Mauritius (1978-1983)
- Jaya Krishna Cuttaree – diplomat
- Madun Dulloo – diplomat
- Anerood Jugnauth – Prime Minister (2000-2003, 2014-2017) and President of Mauritius (2003-2012)
- Pravind Jugnauth – Prime Minister of Mauritius (2017–present)
- Dev Manraj – former Financial Secretary
- Abdool Razack Mohamed – one of the three founding fathers of independent Mauritius
- Kailash Purryag – President (2012-2015)
- Navin Ramgoolam – Prime Minister (1995-2000, 2005-2014)
- Seewoosagur Ramgoolam – Prime Minister (1968-1982) and one of the three founding fathers of independent Mauritius
- Veerasamy Ringadoo – President (1992)
- Cassam Uteem – President (2002)
- Ameenah Gurib-Fakim – President (2015-2018)
- Prithvirajsing Roopun – President (2019–present)

== Netherlands ==
- Tanja Jadnanansing – Labour Party politician

== New Zealand ==
- Kanwaljit Singh Bakshi – Member of Parliament
- Parmjeet Parmar – Member of Parliament
- Anand Satyanand – first Governor-General of New Zealand of Asian descent (2006-2011)
- Priyanca Radhakrishnan – Member of Parliament

== Papua New Guinea ==
- Sasindran Muthuvel – Governor of West New Britain

== Philippines ==
- Ramon Bagatsing - former Congressman and Mayor of Manila (1972-1986)

== Portugal ==
- Jorge Barreto Xavier (born 1965) - Secretary of State of Culture (2012–2015)
- Kalidás Barreto (1932–2020) - MP for Castanheira de Pera
- António Maria de Bettencourt Rodrigues (1854–1933) - Judge and diplomat
- António Costa (born 1961) - Prime Minister of Portugal (2015–2024) and President of the European Council (2024–)
- Narana Coissoró (1931–2026) - Member of Parliament
- Alfredo Bruto da Costa (1938–2016) - Minister of Health and Welfare (1979–1980)
- Alfredo Nobre da Costa (1923–1996) - Prime Minister (1978)
- Francisco Luís Gomes (1829–1869) - Member of Português Cortes Gerais for Goa
- João Leão (born 1974) - Finance Minister (2020–2022)
- Jaime Valfredo Rangel (1897–1959) - Diplomat
- Gabriel Mithá Ribeiro (born 1965) - MP for Leiria District
- Rosendo Ribeiro (1871-1951) - Vice-Consul of Portugal in Nairobi
- Rita Matias (born 1998) - MP of the Assembly of the Republic
- Otelo Saraiva de Carvalho (1936–2021) - Leader in Portuguese provisional government after the Carnation Revolution

== Puerto Rico ==
- Eduardo Bhatia - former President of the Puerto Rican Senate

== Singapore ==
- Vivian Balakrishnan – Minister of Community Development, Youth and Sports; former CEO of Singapore General Hospital
- S. Dhanabalan – Chairman of Temasek Holdings and DBS Bank, former Minister of National Development, Trade and Industry and Foreign Affairs; tipped by Singapore's first Prime Minister Lee Kuan Yew as one of the four men he considered as a possible successor
- James Gomez – senior leader in the main opposition party (the Workers Party); founder of Think Centre, a political NGO
- S. Iswaran – Minister for Communications and Information, former Managing Director of Temasek Holdings
- S. Jayakumar – Deputy Prime Minister, Minister for Law and co-ordinating Minister for Security; former Foreign Minister and ambassador to the United Nations, and Dean of the Law School in Singapore
- J. B. Jeyaretnam – former Leader of the Opposition; former MP; first person to break the PAP monopoly in parliament in 1984; former magistrate
- Devan Nair – third President of Singapore (1981–1985), father of the modern trades union movement in Singapore
- Hri Kumar Nair – former MP
- S. R. Nathan – 6th President of Singapore (1999-2011)
- Murali Pillai – MP
- Indranee Rajah – Minister in Prime minister's Office, Senior Counsel of Supreme Court of Singapore
- S. Rajaratnam – former Senior Minister, Deputy Prime Minister and Minister for Foreign Affairs, Labour and Culture; co-founder of the Peoples Action Party and Association of South East Asian Nations; author of the Singapore Pledge; one of the pioneer leaders of modern Singapore
- Balaji Sadasivan – Junior Minister
- K. Shanmugam – Minister for Home Affairs, former Senior Counsel of Supreme Court of Singapore
- Pritam Singh – Leader of the Opposition and MP
- Halimah Yacob – 8th President of Singapore (2017–2023)

== Seychelles ==
- Wavel Ramkalawan – President of Seychelles (2020–present)
- Satya Naidu- first Hindu member of Seychelles National Assembly.

== South Africa ==
Pravin Gordan - Minister of Finance; Minister of Public Works

- Yusuf Dadoo – doctor and politician
- Frene Ginwala – former speaker of the National Assembly
- Pregs Govender
- Ronnie Govender
- Ahmed Kathrada – political activist
- Jody Kollapen
- Mac Maharaj – political activist and former MP
- George Naicker
- Monty Naicker
- Amma Naidoo
- Indira Naidoo
- Naransamy Roy Naidoo
- Shanti Naidoo
- Thambi Naidoo
- Xavier Naidoo
- Billy Nair
- Dullah Omar – politician
- Aziz Pahad – political activist and former MP
- Essop Pahad – political activist and former MP
- Radhakrishna Padayachi – Deputy Minister for Communication
- Ebrahim Patel – Minister of Economy
- Enver Surty – Deputy Minister of Basic Education
- Thillaiaadi Valliammai

== Spain ==
- Robert Masih Nahar – ERC Senator for Barcelona (2017–2023)

== Suriname ==
- Ashwin Adhin – Vice President (2015-2020)
- Jagernath Lachmon – Speaker of the National Assembly of Suriname (1987-1996, 2000-2001)
- Marijke Djwalapersad – Speaker of the National Assembly (1996-2000)
- Fred Ramdat Misier – President of Suriname (1982–1988)
- Errol Alibux – Prime Minister of Suriname (1983-1984)
- Pretaap Radhakishun – Prime Minister (1986-1987)
- Chan Santokhi – President (2020–present)
- Ram Sardjoe – Speaker of the National Assembly (2001-2005) and Vice President (2005-2010)
- Ramsewak Shankar – President (1988–1990)

== Switzerland ==
- Nik Gugger – adopted from Karnataka; first Indian-origin members of the Swiss parliament

== Tanzania ==
- Hasnain Dewji
- Mohammed Dewji
- Wolfgang Dourado
- Parmukh Singh Hoogan
- Amir H. Jamal
- Ismail Jussa
- Al Noor Kassum
- Shanif Mansoor
- Hasnain Murji
- Mohamed Raza
- Muhammad Sanya
- Abdulkarim Shah
- Jitu Soni
- Haroun Suleiman
- Shaffin Sumar

== Thailand ==
- Santi Thakral – former president of the Supreme Court of Thailand and former member of the Privy Council of Thailand

== Trinidad and Tobago ==
- Raziah Ahmed – President of the Senate (2015)
- Faris Al-Rawi – Attorney General (2015-2022)
- Linda Baboolal – President of the Senate (2002-2007)
- Rudranath Capildeo
- Simbhoonath Capildeo
- Carol Cuffy-Dowlat
- Winston Dookeran
- George F. Fitzpatrick
- Hardeo Hardath – former MP
- Noor Hassanali – President (1987-1997)
- Christine Kangaloo – President (2023–present)
- Franklin Khan
- Fuad Khan
- Dhanayshar Mahabir
- Devant Maharaj
- Ramesh Maharaj
- Kenneth Ramchand
- Bhadase Maraj
- Ralph Maraj
- Wade Mark
- Roodal Moonilal
- Basdeo Panday – Trade Union leader and Prime Minister (1995-2001)
- Kamla Persad-Bissessar – Prime Minister (2010-2015; 2025–present)
- Mohammed Faisal Rahman
- Surujrattan Rambachan
- Anand Ramlogan
- Adrian Cola Rienzi (Krishna Deonarine Tiwari)
- Raffique Shah – Leader of the Opposition
- Cindy Devika Sharma
- Ashford Sinanan

== United Kingdom ==
- Baron Bhattacharyya – former Member of the House of Lords
- Ayesha Hazarika, Baroness Hazarika – Member of the House of Lords
- Mancherjee Bhownagree – former Conservative MP; second Indian MP in the House of Commons
- Harpal Brar – former Chairman of the Communist Party of Great Britain (Marxist-Leninist)
- Nirj Deva – former Conservative MEP
- Parmjit Dhanda – former Labour MP
- Rajani Palme Dutt – former General Secretary of the Communist Party
- Piara Khabra – former Labour MP
- Ashok Kumar – former Labour MP
- Claude Moraes – former Labour MEP
- Dadabhai Naoroji – former Liberal MP; first Indian MP in the House of Commons
- Priti Patel – Conservative MP; Home Secretary (2019–2022)
- Shapurji Saklatvala – former Communist MP
- Virendra Sharma – former Labour MP
- Alok Sharma – former Conservative MP and Secretary of State for Business, Energy and Industrial Strategy
- Marsha Singh – former Labour MP
- Parmjit Singh Gill – former Liberal Democrat MP
- Satyendra Prasanna Sinha, 1st Baron Sinha – first Indian member of the House of Lords
- Rishi Sunak – Prime Minister and Leader of the Conservative Party (2022–2024)
- Shailesh Vara – former Conservative MP
- Keith Vaz – former Labour MP; longest-serving British Asian MP; former Minister for Europe and Privy Council member

== United States ==
- Dimple Ajmera – Democratic, North Carolina
- Abbas Akhil – Democratic, New Mexico
- Saqib Ali – Democratic, Maryland
- Niraj Antani – Republican, Ohio
- Danny Avula – Democratic, Virginia
- Harry Arora – Republican, Connecticut
- Sam Arora – Democratic, Maryland
- Kumar Barve – Democratic, Maryland
- Jasmeet Bains – Democratic, California
- Preeta D. Bansal – Democratic, New York
- Anil Beephan Jr. – Democratic, New Jersey
- Ami Bera – Democratic, California
- Ravinder Bhalla – Democratic, New Jersey
- Raj Bhakta – Republican, Pennsylvania
- Amit Bose – Democratic, Georgia
- Satveer Chaudhary – Democratic, Minnesota
- Upendra J. Chivukula – Democratic, New Jersey
- Saikat Chakrabarti – Democratic, California
- Neil Chatterjee – Republican, New York
- Jay Chaudhuri – Democratic, North Carolina
- Aneesh Chopra – Democratic, New Jersey
- Shasti Conrad – Democratic, Washington
- Jeremy Cooney – Democratic, New York
- Rohit Chopra – Republican, New Jersey
- Swati Dandekar – Democratic, Iowa
- Pia Dandiya - Democratic, Florida
- Manka Dhingra – Democratic, Washington
- Shefali Razdan Duggal – Democratic, Ohio
- Mervyn Dymally – Democratic, California
- Sara Gideon – Democratic, Maine
- Kashmir Gill – Republican, California
- Sim Gill – Democratic, Utah
- Vin Gopal – Democratic, New Jersey
- Raj Goyle – Democratic, Kansas
- Nikki Haley – Republican, South Carolina
- Kamala Harris – Democratic, California
- Mohammed Hameeduddin – Democratic, New Jersey
- Ghazala Hashmi – Democratic, Virginia
- Kesha Ram Hinsdale – Democratic, Vermont
- Satish Hiremath – Independent, Arizona
- Pramila Jayapal – Democratic, Washington
- Susheela Jayapal – Democratic, Oregon
- Bobby Jindal – Republican, Louisiana
- Ash Kalra – Democratic, California
- Neel Kashkari – Republican, California
- Ro Khanna – Democratic, California
- Raja Krishnamoorthi – Democratic, Illinois
- Padma Kuppa – Democratic, Michigan
- Zohran Mamdani – Democratic, New York
- Nimi McConigley – Republican, Wyoming
- Aruna Miller – Democratic, Maryland
- Raj Mukherji – Democratic, New Jersey
- Ron Nirenberg – Democratic, Texas
- Darshana Patel – Democratic, California
- Arati Prabhakar – Democratic, Texas
- Aftab Pureval – Democratic, Ohio
- Vivek Ramaswamy – Republican, Ohio
- Nithya Raman – Democratic, California
- Harpreet Singh Sandhu – Democratic, California
- Raj Salwan – Democratic, California
- Reshma Saujani – Democratic, Illinois
- Dalip Singh Saund – Democratic, California
- Kshama Sawant – Independent, Washington
- Amish Shah – Democratic, Arizona
- Harry Sidhu – Republican, California
- Balvir Singh – Democratic, New Jersey
- Sam Singh – Democratic, Michigan
- Suhas Subramanyam – Democratic, Virginia
- Shri Thanedar – Democratic, Michigan
- Hiral Tipirneni – Democratic, Arizona
- Kevin Thomas – Democratic, New York
- Neera Tanden – Democratic, Massachusetts
- Savita Vaidhyanathan – Democratic, California
- William Hogan – Jacksonian, New York
- Gurbir Grewal – Democratic, New Jersey
- Jay Goyal – Democratic, Ohio
- Ram Villivalam – Democratic, Illinois
- Arvind Venkat – Democratic, Pennsylvania
- Manan Trivedi – Democratic, Pennsylvania
- Vinai Thummalapally – Democratic, California
- Saggy Tahir – Republican, New Hampshire
- Nabeela Syed – Democratic, Illinois
- Priya Sundareshan – Democratic, Arizona
- Sterley Stanley – Democratic, New Jersey
- Prasad Srinivasan – Republican, Connecticut
- Kannan Srinivasan – Democratic, Virginia
- Vandana Slatter – Democratic, Washington
- Ravi Singh – Republican, Illinois
- Jas Jeet Singh – Democratic, Virginia
- Hari Sevugan – Democratic, Illinois
- Nikil Saval – Democratic, Pennsylvania
- Minita Sanghvi – Democratic, New York
- Sameer Kanal – Democratic, Oregon
- Usha Reddi – Democratic, Kansas
- Manohar Raju – Democratic, California
- Jenifer Rajkumar – Democratic, New York
- Pakkiri Rajagopal – Republican, Ohio
- Suraj Patel – Democratic, New York
- Ameya Pawar – Democratic, Illinois
- Roxanne Persaud – Democratic, New York
- Ranjeev Puri – Democratic, Michigan
- Manju Ganeriwala – Independent, Virginia
- Abraham George – Republican, Texas
- Ajit Pai – Republican, Kansas
- Kevin Olickal – Democratic, Illinois
- Yadav Nathwani – Republican, Illinois
- Mujtaba A. Mohammed – Democratic, North Carolina
- Sanjeev Manohar – Democratic, New Hampshire
- Latha Mangipudi – Democratic, New Hampshire
- Manoj Chourasia – Democratic, New Hampshire
- Vivek Malek – Republican, Missouri
- Sabi "Doc" Kumar – Republican, Tennessee
- Nima Kulkarni – Democratic, Kentucky
- Shekar Krishnan – Democratic, New York
- Joseph Kishore – Socialist Equality, New Jersey
- Josh Kaul – Democratic, Wisconsin
- Ankit Jain – Democratic, Washington D.C.
- Janak Joshi – Republican, Colorado
- Meera Joshi – Democratic, New York
- Mona Das – Democratic, Washington
- Shanti Gandhi – Republican, Kansas
- Harmeet Dhillon – Republican, California
- Wanika B. Fisher – Democratic, Maryland
- Sunil Freeman – Socialism and Liberation, Maryland

== See also ==
- List of heads of state and government of Indian origin
- List of foreign politicians of Armenian origin
- List of foreign politicians of Chinese descent
- List of foreign politicians of Iranian origin
- List of foreign politicians of Japanese origin
- List of foreign politicians of Korean origin
- List of foreign politicians of Pakistani origin
- List of foreign politicians of Vietnamese origin
