= List of foreign politicians of Japanese origin =

This article contains a list of Wikipedia articles about politicians in countries outside Japan who are of Japanese origin.

== Heads of state and heads of government ==
This is a list of former and current heads of state and heads of government of the sovereign countries who were/are of full or partial Japanese origin. This list does not include acting, interim, transitional, temporary or representative heads of state and government.

Heads of state and heads of governments of Japanese origin
S.No.	Name	Portrait	Country	Title	Tenure	Ref.
1	Bernard Dowiyogo バーナード・ドウィヨゴ		Nauru	President of Nauru	1976-78, 1989-95, 1996, 1998-99, 2000-01, 2003	
2	Tosiwo Nakayama トシオ・ナカヤマ		Micronesia	President of the Federated States of Micronesia	1979–1987	
3	Amata Kabua アマタ・カブア		Marshall Islands	President of the Marshall Islands	1979–96	
4	Haruo Remeliik ハルオ・レメリク		Palau	President of Palau	1981–85	
5	Alberto Fujimori アルベルト・フジモリ		Peru	President of Peru	1990–2000	
6	Kuniwo Nakamura クニオ・ナカムラ		Palau	President of Palau	1993–2001	
7	Kessai Note ケーサイ・ノート		Marshall Islands	President of the Marshall Islands	2000–08	
8	Manny Mori マニー・モリ		Micronesia	President of the Federated States of Micronesia	2007–15	
9	Keiko Fujimori ケイコ・フジモリ		Peru	President of Peru	2026–present	

== Argentina ==
- Mario Alberto Ishii - Mayor of José C. Paz Partido and Provincial Senator for Buenos Aires Province
- Laura Russo - National Deputy for Buenos Aires Province
- Alicia Terada - National Deputy for Chaco Province

== Australia ==
- Rob Lucas – Treasurer of South Australia (1997-2002, 2018-2022)

== Austria ==
- Richard von Coudenhove-Kalergi – founding president of the Paneuropean Union (1923–1972)

== Brazil ==
- Luiz Gushiken – Minister of Social Communication and Strategic Management (2003–2005), President of the Workers' Party (1988–1990) and Federal Deputy for São Paulo (1987–1999)
- Walter Ihoshi – Federal Deputy for São Paulo (1996–2007)
- Kim Kataguiri – Federal Deputy for São Paulo
- Luiz Nishimori – Federal Deputy for Paraná
- Keiko Ota – Federal Deputy for São Paulo
- Hatiro Shimomoto – State Deputy for São Paulo
- Hidekazu Takayama – Federal Deputy for Paraná

== Canada ==
- Barry Morishita – Leader of the Alberta Party and former Mayor of Brooks, Alberta
- Bev Oda – Minister of International Cooperation (2007–2012) and Minister of Canadian Heritage and Status of Women (2006–2007)
- David Tsubouchi – Member of the Provincial Parliament of Ontario
- Naomi Yamamoto – Minister in the Provincial Government of British Columbia

== Chile ==
- Carlos Ominami - Minister of the Economy (1990–1992)

== China ==
- Koxinga - 17th-century warlord and ruler of the Kingdom of Tungning (1661-1662)
- Zheng Jing – Ruler of the Kingdom of Tungning (1662-1681)
- Zheng Keshuang – Ruler of the Kingdom of Tungning (1681-1683)
- Zheng Kezang – Crown Prince of the Kingdom of Tungning

== Czechia ==
- Tomio Okamura - Deputy Speaker of the Chamber of Deputies and founder of Dawn – National Coalition and Freedom and Direct Democracy, presidential candidate
- Hayato Okamura - MP

== Malaysia ==
- Fuad Stephens – Chief Minister (1963-1964 and 1976) and Yang di-Pertua Negeri (1973-1975 of Sabah and High Commissioner to Australia (1968–1973)

== Marshall Islands ==
- Kunio Lemari – Acting president of the Marshall Islands (1996–1997)
- James Matayoshi – Mayor of Rongelap Atoll

== Mexico ==
- René Fujiwara – Federal Deputy for the Federal District
- Gilberto Hirata – Federal Deputy for Baja California and Mayor of Ensenada
- Pedro Kumamoto – State Deputy of Jalisco
- Jesús Kumate Rodríguez – Secretary of Health (1988–1994)

== Micronesia ==
- Hirosi Ismael – Vice President (1987–1991)
- Masao Nakayama – Ambassador to Japan (1989–1997)

== Nauru ==
- Valdon Dowiyogo – Speaker of Parliament (2004–2007)

== Nepal ==
- Takashi Miyahara – founder of the Nepal Rastriya Bikas Party

== Netherlands ==
- Mariko Peters – Member of the House of Representatives

== Norway ==
- Naomi Ichihara Røkkum – Substitute member of the Oslo City Council

== Pakistan ==
- Hameeda Waheeduddin – Member of the Provincial Assembly of the Punjab

== Palau ==
- Santy Asanuma – Senator
- Elias Camsek Chin - Vice President (2005–2009)
- Hersey Kyota - Ambassador to the United States
- Peter Sugiyama – Senator

== Peru ==
- Kenji Fujimori - Son of Alberto Fujimori, Congressman for Lima
- Santiago Fujimori - Brother of Alberto Fujimori, Congressman for Lima
- Víctor García Toma - Minister of Justice (2010)
- Susana Higuchi - Former wife of Alberto Fujimori, Congresswoman for Lima
- Augusto Miyashiro - Mayor of Chorrillos District
- Rafael Yamashiro - Congressman for Ica Department
- Jaime Yoshiyama - President of the Democratic Constituent Congress (1992–1995)

== Philippines ==
- Hori Horibata - Congressman for Camarines Sur

== Russia ==
- Irina Khakamada – Deputy Chair of the State Duma (2000–2003)

== Singapore ==
- Edmund W. Barker – Leader of the House (1968-1985), Minister for Law (1964-1988), Minister for National Development (1965-1975), Minister for Home Affairs (1972), Minister for the Environment (1975-1979) and Minister for Science and Technology (1977-1981)

== Taiwan ==
- Mai Yamada - New Taipei City Councillor for Banqiao district (2022–present)
- Tjaravak Kadrangian - Minister of the Council of Aboriginal Affairs (1996–2000)
- Sisy Chen - Member of the Legislative Yuan for Taipei (2002–2005)
- Chiang Wei-kuo - Secretary-General of the National Security Council (1986–1993)
- Liao Liou-yi - Secretary-General of the Kuomintang (2011–2012), Secretary-General to the President (2009–2011) and Minister of the Interior (2008-2009)

== United Kingdom ==
- Jess Asato - Labour MP
- Iain Duncan Smith - Conservative MP and Secretary of State for Work and Pensions (2010–2016)

== United States ==
=== Cabinet ===
- Norman Mineta – Secretary of Commerce (2000–2001) and Secretary of Transportation (2001–2006); also U.S. Representative from California (1975-1995) and Mayor of San Jose (1971–1975)
- Eric Shinseki – Secretary of Veterans Affairs (2009-2014)

=== Congress ===
- Colleen Hanabusa – Representative from Hawaii
- S. I. Hayakawa – Senator from California
- Mazie Hirono – Senator from Hawaii
- Mike Honda – Representative from California
- Daniel Inouye - Representative and Senator from Hawaii; President pro tempore of the United States Senate (2010–2012)
- Bob Matsui – Representative from California
- Doris Matsui – Representative from California
- Spark Matsunaga - Representative and Senator from Hawaii
- Patsy Mink – Representative from Hawaii
- Pat Saiki – Representative from Hawaii
- Mark Takai – Representative from Hawaii
- Mark Takano – Representative from California
- Jill Tokuda – Representative from Hawaii

=== Governors and lieutenant governors ===
- Kazuhisa Abe – 12th Lieutenant Governor of Hawaii (2012-2018) and President of the Hawaii Senate (2010-2012)
- George Ariyoshi – 3rd Governor of Hawaii (1974–1986)
- Nelson Doi – 5th Lieutenant Governor of Hawaii (1974-1978) and President of the Hawaii Senate (1963-1964)
- David Ige – 8th Governor of Hawaii (2014–2022)
- Jean King – 6th Lieutenant Governor of Hawaii (1978-1982)

=== State and territory levels ===
- Earl Anzai – 12th Attorney General of Hawaii (1999-2002)
- Paul Bannai – Member of the California State Assembly
- Carol Fukunaga – Member of the Hawaii Senate and House of Representatives
- Warren Furutani – Member of the California State Assembly
- Bob Hasegawa – Member of the Washington Senate and House of Representatives
- Steve Hobbs – 16th Secretary of State of Washington (2021–present)
- Jani Iwamoto – Member of the Utah Senate
- Scott Kawasaki – Member of the Alaska Senate and House of Representatives
- Sam Kito III – Member of the Alaska House of Representatives
- Ron Kouchi – President of the Hawaii Senate (2015–present)
- Stan Matsunaka – President of the Colorado Senate (2001-2002)
- Al Muratsuchi – Member of the California State Assembly
- George Nakano – Member of the California State Assembly
- Curtis Oda – Member of the Utah House of Representatives
- Richard Onishi – Member of the Hawaii House of Representatives
- Keiko Orrall – Member of the Massachusetts House of Representatives
- Scott Saiki – Speaker of the Hawaii House of Representatives (2017–present)
- Dean Sanpei – Member of the Utah House of Representatives
- Sharon Tomiko Santos – Member of the Washington House of Representatives
- Jackson Sayama – Member of the Hawaii House of Representatives
- Brian Shiozawa – Member of the Utah Senate
- Monica Stonier – Member of the Washington House of Representatives
- Pat Takasugi – Member of the Idaho House of Representatives
- Tom Takubo – Majority Leader of the West Virginia Senate (2019–present)
- Tommy Tanaka – Speaker of the Guam Legislature (1979–1983)
- Chris Toshiro Todd – Member of the Hawaii House of Representatives
- Clift Tsuji – Member of the Hawaii House of Representatives
- Shan Tsutsui – President of the Hawaii Senate (1964-1965)
- Kip Tokuda – Member of the Washington House of Representatives
- Erika Uyterhoeven – Member of the Massachusetts House of Representatives
- Julie VanOrden – Member of the Idaho Senate and House of Representatives
- Glenn Wakai – Member of the Hawaii Senate and House of Representatives
- Dennis Yamada – Member of the Hawaii House of Representatives
- Mariko Yamada – Member of the California State Assembly
- Julie Yamamoto – Member of the Idaho House of Representatives

=== County and city levels ===
- Bernard Akana – Mayor of Hawaii County (1988-1990)
- Alan Arakawa – Mayor of Maui County (2003-2007, 2011-2019)
- Bruce Harrell – Mayor of Seattle (2017, 2022–2026)
- Adena Ishii – Mayor of Berkeley, California
- James Kanno – Mayor of Fountain Valley, California
- Derek Kawakami – Mayor of Kauai (2018–present) and member of the Hawaii House of Representatives (2011-2016)
- Herbert Matayoshi – Mayor of Hawaii County (1974–1984)
- Kinjiro Matsudaira – Mayor of Edmonston, Maryland (1927, 1943)
- Ken Miyagishima – Mayor of Las Cruces, New Mexico (2007–2023)
- Paul Miyamoto – Sheriff of San Francisco (2020–present)
- S. Floyd Mori – Mayor of Pleasanton, California (1974–1975)
- Alan Nakanishi – Mayor of Lodi, California (2001–2002, 2012–2014)
- Eunice Sato – Mayor of Long Beach, California (1980–1982)
- Nao Takasugi – Mayor of Oxnard, California (1982–1992)
- Paul Tanaka – Mayor of Gardena, California (2005–2016)
- Larry Tanimoto – Mayor of Hawaii County (1990)
- Charmaine Tavares – Mayor of Maui County (2007–2011)
- Stephen K. Yamashiro – Mayor of Hawaii County (1992–2000)

== See also ==
- List of heads of state and government of Indian origin
- List of foreign politicians of Chinese origin
- List of foreign politicians of Korean origin
- List of foreign politicians of Indian origin
- List of foreign politicians of Vietnamese origin
- List of foreign politicians of Iranian origin
