= Prema Naidoo =

South African former anti-apartheid activist (born 1945)

Parmananthan "Prema" Naidoo (born 1945) is a South African former anti-apartheid activist, later a politician in local government Before his retirement, he was Chief Whip of the Johannesburg Metro Council.

== Early life and education ==
Parmananthan Naidoo was born in Doornfontein, Johannesburg, in 1945, the youngest son of Ama and Roy Naidoo, and grandson of Thambi Naidoo. (Note: Note that SAHO incorrectly cites Thambi as his father.) His siblings included Shanti Naidoo and Indres Naidoo.

Naidoo attended the segregated government school for Indians in Doornfontein for primary school. After the school was closed by the apartheid government, Indian families had to move to Lenasia, a segregated suburb established by the Group Areas Act. He then attended the Central Indian School established in Fordsburg, which had been established by the Transvaal Indian Congress, a civil rights organisation. However, he had to leave school before matriculating, as his brother Indres was imprisoned on Robben Island for sabotage in 1963.

== Activism and detainment ==
Naidoo was first arrested as a 15-year-old, charged with trespassing on railway property while he was distributing pamphlets published by the South African Congress of Trade Unions. After being found guilty, he was cautioned and discharged as he was under 16.

From the late 1960s, despite extreme repression by the government, Naidoo became active in the Transvaal Indian Youth Congress. He co-founded the Human Rights Committee with Sheila Weinberg and Mohamed Timol, whose brother, Ahmed, had been tortured to death in prison. The Committee drew attention to political prisoners and assisted their families.

Naidoo was detained on 21 November 1981, under the Internal Security Act, and subjected to beatings and torture. After months in detention he was tried and sentenced on 1 April 1982 to an effective further year in prison on the charge of harbouring Stephen Lee, an escaped convict. Lee and two other political prisoners, Tim Jenkin and Alex Moumbaris, had escaped from the Pretoria Maximum Security Prison

On his release in 1983, Naidoo took part in the formation of the United Democratic Front and was detained again for eight months during the State of Emergency of 1985.

== Post-apartheid ==
After the first non-racial elections of 1994, Naidoo served in senior local authority positions in Johannesburg. He was councillor and Chief Whip in the City of Johannesburg Metropolitan Municipality, before retiring in 2016. As of April 2026 he is a member of the board of the Ahmed Kathrada Foundation.
