= Naidoo =

Naidoo is a South African Indian surname. It is an alternative spelling of the Telugu name Naidu.

Notable people with the surname include:

- Ama Naidoo (1908–1993), South African anti-apartheid activist
- Anand Naidoo, South African television anchor
- Beverley Naidoo, South African children's author
- Euvin Naidoo, South African businessman
- Indira Naidoo (born 1968), Australian author
- Indira Naidoo-Harris, South African-born Canadian politician
- Jailoshini Naidoo, South African actress
- Jay Naidoo (born 1954), South African trade unionist
- Kasturi "Kass" Naidoo (born 1975 or 1976) a female South African cricket commentator.
- Kesivan Naidoo (born 1979), South African drummer
- Kimeshan Naidoo (born 1991), South African entrepreneur and engineer
- Kumi Naidoo (born 1965), South African human rights activist
- Leigh-Ann Naidoo (born 1976), South African beach volleyball player
- Manna Naidoo (1948–2022), South African politician
- Naransamy Roy Naidoo (1901–1953), South African activist
- Navanetham Naidoo (born 1941), birth name of judge and 2026 Nobel Peace Prize winner Navi Pillay
- Ravi Naidoo, South African designer
- Shanti Naidoo, South African anti-apartheid activist
- Shashi Naidoo (born 1980), South African actress
- Stephen Naidoo (1937–1989), South African Roman Catholic archbishop
- Thambi Naidoo (1875–1933), South African politician
- Vassi Naidoo (1955–2021), South African businessman
- Xavier Naidoo (born 1971), German singer
