= List of foreign politicians of Korean origin =

This article contains a list of Wikipedia articles about politicians in countries outside Korea who are of Korean origin.

== Australia ==
- Elizabeth Lee – Leader of the Opposition in the Australian Capital Territory Legislative Assembly (2020–present)

== Bolivia ==
- Chi Hyun Chung – presidential candidate

== Canada ==
- Raymond Cho – Minister of Seniors and Accessibility of Ontario
- Stan Cho – Associate Minister of Transportation (2007–2012) of Ontario
- Sandy Lee – Member of the Legislative Assembly of the Northwest Territories
- Yonah Martin – Deputy Leader of the Opposition in the Senate
- Jane Shin – Member of the Legislative Assembly of British Columbia
- Nelly Shin – Member of Parliament in the House of Commons of Canada

== China ==
- Jin Zhenji – Vice Governor of Jilin Province (2007–2011)
- Li Yongtai – Military officer and delegate to the National People's Congress
- Zhao Nanqi – Vice Chairperson of the Chinese People's Political Consultative Conference (1998–2003)
- Zhu Dehai – Governor of the Yanbian Korean Autonomous Prefecture (1952–1967)

== France ==
- Cédric O – Secretary of State for the Digital Sector
- Delphine O – Member of the National Assembly
- Fleur Pellerin – Minister of Culture and Communications (2014–2016)
- Jean-Vincent Placé – Member of the Regional Council of Île-de-France
- Joachim Son-Forget – Member of the National Assembly

== Japan ==
- Shinkun Haku – Member of the House of Councillors
- Shigenori Tōgō – Minister for Foreign Affairs (1941–1942)

== Kazakhstan ==
- Alexey Tsoy – Minister of Health (2020–2021)

== Kyrgyzstan ==
- Roman Shin – Deputy of the Jogorku Kenesh

== New Zealand ==
- Melissa Lee – Member of the New Zealand Parliament

== Russia ==
- Marina Kim – Executive in the political party A Just Russia – For Truth
- Olga Li – Member of the Kursk regional legislative
- Sergey Tsoy – Former official in Moscow City Hall
- Valery Kan – Member of the Legislative Assembly of Primorsky Krai

== Ukraine ==
- Vitalii Kim – Governor of Mykolaiv Oblast (2020–present)
- Oleksandr Sin – Mayor of Zaporizhzhia (2010–2015)

== United States ==
=== US Congress ===
- Andy Kim – Representative from New Jersey
- Jay Kim – Representative from California (1993–1999)
- Marilyn Strickland – Representative from Washington
- Young Kim – Representative from California
- Michelle Steel – Representative from California

=== State and territory levels ===
- Francis Allen-Palenske – Member of the Nevada Assembly
- Jennifer Carnahan – Chair of the Minnesota Republican Party (2017–2021)
- David S. Chang – Chairman of the Hawaii Republican Party (2011–2014)
- Mark S. Chang – Member of the Maryland House of Delegates
- Sam Cho – Member of the Seattle Port Commission
- Martha Choe – Member of the Seattle City Council (1991–1999)
- Jun Choi – Mayor of Edison, New Jersey (2006–2010)
- Steven Choi – Member of the California State Assembly (2016–2022); Mayor of Irvine, California (2012–2016)
- Chris Chyung – Member of the Indiana House of Representatives (2018–2020)
- Kimberly Fiorello – Member of the Connecticut House of Representatives
- Sharon Har – Member of the Hawaii House of Representatives (2007–2022)
- Mary Hayashi – Member of the California State Assembly (2006–2012)
- Francesca Hong – Member of the Wisconsin State Assembly
- Soo Hong – Member of the Georgia House of Representatives
- Hoon-Yung Hopgood – Member of the Michigan Senate and House of Representatives
- Justin Hwang – Chairman of the Oregon Republican Party
- Jacey Jetton – Member of the Texas House of Representatives
- Sukhee Kang – Mayor of Irvine, California (2008–2012)
- Mark Keam – Member of the Virginia House of Delegates
- Donna Mercado Kim – President of the Hawaii Senate (2012–2015); Member of the Hawaii Senate (2000–present), Honolulu City Council (1984–2000), and Hawaii House of Representatives (1982–1984)
- Harry Kim – Mayor of Hawaii County (2000–2008, 2016–2020)
- Jane Kim – Member of the San Francisco Board of Supervisors (2011–2019)
- Patty Kim – Member of the Pennsylvania House of Representatives
- Ron Kim – Member of the New York State Assembly
- Tammy Kim – Member of the Irvine City Council (2020–present)
- Grace Lee – Member of the New York State Assembly
- John Lee – Member of the Los Angeles City Council
- John Lim – Member of the Oregon House of Representatives
- Sylvia Luke – Lieutenant Governor of Hawaii (2022–present)
- Dave Min – Member of the California State Senate
- David Moon – Member of the Maryland House of Delegates
- David Oh – Member of the Philadelphia City Council (2012–2023)
- Kevin O'Toole – Member of the New Jersey Senate
- Daniel Pae – Member of the Oklahoma House of Representatives
- B. J. Pak – Member of the Georgia House of Representatives
- Ellen Park – Member of the New Jersey General Assembly
- Sam Park – Member of the Georgia House of Representatives
- Maria Robinson – Member of the Massachusetts House of Representatives
- Cliff Rosenberger – Speaker of the Ohio House of Representatives (2015–2018)
- Cindy Ryu – Member of the Washington House of Representatives
- David Ryu – Member of the Los Angeles City Council (2015–2020)
- Anna Song – Member of the Santa Clara County School Board (2000–2020)
- Irene Shin – Member of the Virginia House of Delegates
- Paull Shin – Member of the Washington Senate and House of Representatives
- Alfred H. Song – Member of the California Senate (1967–1978) and State Assembly (1963–1967)
- Julie Won – Member of the New York City Council
- Sam Yoon – Member of the Boston City Council (2006–2010)

== Uzbekistan ==
- Agrippina Shin – Minister of Preschool Education since 2017
- Vitaly Fen – diplomat to South Korea (1995–2013)

== See also ==
- List of heads of state and government of Indian origin
- List of foreign politicians of Chinese origin
- List of foreign politicians of Indian origin
- List of foreign politicians of Japanese origin
- List of foreign politicians of Vietnamese origin
- List of foreign politicians of Iranian origin
