= NTM =

NTM may refer to:

== Medicine and Science ==
- Neural Turing machine, a recurrent neural network model
- Nondeterministic Turing machine, a theoretical model of computation
- Nontuberculous mycobacteria, a class of bacteria
- NTM (gene), which encodes the protein neurotrimin

== Organisations ==
- National Taiwan Museum, a museum in Taipei, Taiwan
- National Technical Museum (Prague), an institution in the Czech Republic
- National Theatre Movement, in Victoria, Australia
- National Transformation Movement, two political parties in Trinidad and Tobago
- National Translation Mission, an Indian initiative to make texts accessible
- Neil Thomas Ministries, a Christian organization
- Network Television Marketing, a television station in Pakistan
- New Tribes Mission, now Ethnos360, a Christian mission in Sanford, Florida, USA

== Other ==
- Miracema do Tocantins Airport (IATA: NTM), Brazil
- Nateni language (by ISO 639 code)
- National technical means of verification are monitoring techniques for verifying adherence to international treaties.
- Non-tariff measures, a type of barrier to trade
- Notice to mariners, a navigational safety publication
- Suprême NTM, a French hip-hop duo
