= Neil Aggett =

South African activist (1953 - 1982)

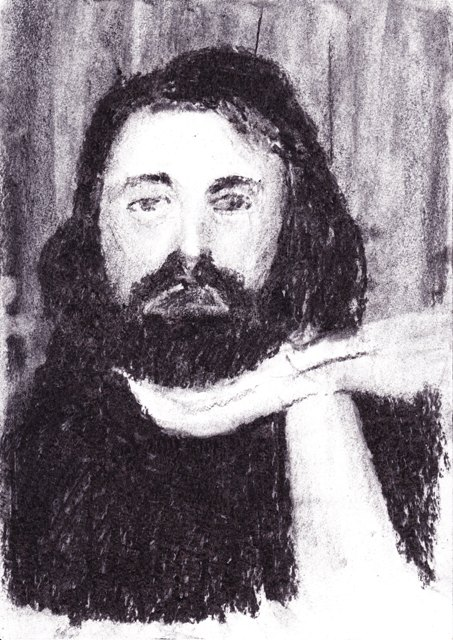
- Charcoal drawing of Neil Aggett by Amitabh Mitra
- Born: Neil Hudson Aggett; 6 October 1953; Nanyuki, Kenya
- Died: 5 February 1982 (aged 28); Johannesburg, South Africa
- Burial place: Westpark Cemetery Grave ECB1613
- Occupations: Medical doctor, trade unionist
- Known for: Being killed by the apartheid-era Security Branch of the police while being held in detention without trial

Neil Hudson Aggett (6 October 1953 – 5 February 1982) was a Kenyan and South African doctor and trade union organiser who died in detention, after being held for 70 days without trial, during which he was tortured by the Security Branch of the apartheid government's South African Police Service. An initial inquest carried out in 1982 cleared the police, but after continued and increased pressure by his sister Jill Burger, partner Liz Floyd, activists, and supporters, a second inquest was held by the High Court in 2020, ruling in December 2022 that Aggett did not die by suicide as claimed, but was killed by members of the Security Branch.

Aggett was born in Kenya before moving to Grahamstown, South Africa, where he attended high school. He did his medical training at the University of Cape Town before moving around the country working in various segregated hospitals. He became involved in the trade union movement while working in a large hospital in Soweto.

== Early life and education ==
Neil Hudson Aggett was born on 6 October 1953 in Nanyuki, Kenya, the eldest child of first-born child of Aubrey and Joy Aggett. His sister is Jill Burger. Their parents were, at that time, according to Burger "very right-wing".

He did some primary schooling in Kenya, before his family moved to South Africa in 1964, where he attended Kingswood College (South Africa) in Grahamstown from 1964 to 1970.

He enrolled for a medical degree at the University of Cape Town in 1971, graduating in 1976.

== Career and activism ==
Aggett worked as a physician in Black hospitals (under apartheid, hospitals were segregated) in Umtata, Tembisa and later at Baragwanath Hospital in Soweto, working in Casualty and learning to speak Zulu.

At Baragwanath, he became involved in the trade union movement. He was appointed an unpaid organiser of the Transvaal Food and Canning Workers' Union, continuing to work night shifts at the hospital to support himself, and also took on an additional role with the Industrial Aid Society, a project of the Wage and Economic Commission which ran a legal aid service and education and literacy programme. He helped to organise the workers at Fatti's and Moni's in Isando and Thembisa, at a critical time when the company faced a growing boycott campaign, which grew into an international boycott, for having unfairly dismissed workers at its factory in Bellville in the Western Cape, for choosing to be represented by their union rather than the company's committee.

Following a historic gathering in Langa, near Cape Town, in August 1981, of unions that had previously been fiercely divided, he was entrusted with building a Transvaal Solidarity Committee. His aim was to form a mass democratic movement that united the unions, to benefit the health and economic improvement of workers.

By this time, he had come to the attention of the government, which labelled him a communist, and the South African Police, who started to surveil and harass him.

== Detention and death ==
Aggett was detained by security police with his partner Elizabeth Floyd (also a medical doctor and fellow activist) on 27 November 1981, after the couple were picked up by police from a friend's house in Johannesburg. Their names had been found along with other activists on a list which had been unwittingly dropped by Barbara Hogan in a dead-letter box for an UMkhonto weSizwe (MK) group from Botswana, after it had been infiltrated by the Security Branch. Hogan had been detained and tortured by Security Branch police in the previous month, forcing her to give up information about members of the ANC and MK. She later said that their chief interrogator, Stephan Whitehead, had shown an unhealthy obsessive interest in the couple.

Aggett was first taken to a police station in Pretoria, and then John Vorster Square in Johannesburg, while Floyd was taken to Bronkhorstspruit police station He was detained without trial for 70 days, and underwent 62 hours of interrogation in the hours before his death on 5 February 1982, aged 28. His torture included his head being so tightly bound in a wet towel that he struggled to breathe, and regular electric shocks. His death marked the 51st death in detention, and he was the first white person to die in detention since 1963, and the first under these circumstances. According to the South African Security Police, Aggett allegedly committed suicide by hanging himself with a scarf while being held at the John Vorster Square police station. However, fellow activists, along with his family and friends, have always believed that he was killed by torture or after being tortured by the Special Branch.

Floyd was held in solitary confinement for weeks before being moved to the Hillbrow police station. During her detainment there, she was taken twice to John Vorster Square for interrogation by the same team who had questioned Aggett: experienced negotiator Captain Johan Naude, along with less experienced but more intimidating junior officers, Lt Stephen (Stephan) Whitehead and Detective Warrant Officer Desire Carr.

After the announcement of Aggett's death, previously divided unions called for a joint nationwide stay-away, stopping work for half an hour, in which about 90,000 workers from across the country participated, including 7,000 FOSATU workers at the Uitenhage branch of Volkswagen. Unions organised a nationwide work stoppage for half an hour on 11 February. His funeral took place on 13 February 1982 in St Mary's Cathedral, Johannesburg, attended by around 2,000 people. Union leader Jan Theron, in an address that was translated into Zulu, blamed the government for Aggett's death. Around 15,000 mourners attended the funeral procession, including Bishop Desmond Tutu. Much anger was expressed about his death by the mourners, who also included many union members and students, as they marched from the Anglican Cathedral to Westpark Cemetery in Johannesburg. They sung revolutionary songs, such as "Nkosi Sikelel' iAfrika" (anthem of the struggle, now South Africa's national anthem) and "Senzeni Na?" (What have we done?) and the funeral and procession were filmed. A description of the funeral was reported in The New York Times.

His partner, Liz, was not able to attend as she had been tortured by police, and later had to relearn how to read and write owing to PTSD.

Aggett is buried in the Westpark Cemetery. His grave is numbered ECB1613.

=== First inquest (1982) ===
The inquest into his death lasted 44 days, concluding on 21 December 1982. The Aggett team of lawyers, led by anti-apartheid activist and senior legal counsel George Bizos with Denis Kuny as his junior, used similar fact evidence from other detainees and argued "induced suicide". For the first time in a South African court of law, former detainees gave evidence of torture. Liz Floyd later described them as extremely brave, as they knew that they could be detained again by their torturers.

Aggett had made an affidavit 14 hours before his death that he had been assaulted, blindfolded, and given electric shocks. However, Magistrate Pieter Kotze ruled that the death was not brought about by any act or omission on the part of the police. David Forbes, who at the time of Aggett's death was sub-editor at the Rand Daily Mail, called Aggett's death a "public relations disaster" for the government, and called this inquest a "whitewash", which was contradicted by the facts in the case. One of the lies was that there had been no patrols between 10.30pm and 1.30am, as the cells were always patrolled by uniformed police 24/7; the kikoi used by Aggett to hang himself is improbable, as personal items were not allowed in the cells.

Cronwright died sometime in the 1980s.

Some five years after his death, at the 1987 conference of the Five Freedoms Forum, fellow detainee Frank Chikane recalled how he had seen Aggett in jail returning from one of his interrogations, being half-carried, half-dragged by warders; Chikane saw this as a sign of how badly injured Aggett was at the time.

=== TRC (1998) ===
When Aggett's case came before the Truth and Reconciliation Commission after the end of apartheid in 1998, it overturned the "no blame" verdict. Major Arthur Benoni Cronwright and Lieutenant Stephen Whitehead (Stephan Peter Whitehead, born 20 January 1957) were held directly responsible "for the mental and physical condition of Dr Aggett which led him to take his own life". They were held responsible for his "induced suicide". Whitehead did not take the opportunity to admit his guilt and receive amnesty from future prosecution, instead continuing to work as a security consultant, and apparently became a successful businessman as a "business counterintelligence consultant", until he came under scrutiny after beings exposed as supplying services to the ANC government, among others, in 2012. In 2015, Sunday Times reported that he had received detailed payments "totalling R4 million from government entities between 2007 and 2014".

=== Attempted prosecution (2013) ===
The Neil Aggett Support Group was formed in 2012 after Beverley Naidoo, a cousin of Aggett's mother, published a biography of Aggett titled Death of an Idealist: In Search of Neil Aggett. The group, which included Donald McRae and Aggett's sister Jill Burger (both of whom had moved overseas), laid a private criminal charge of culpable homicide against Whitehead, as primary torturer, on the anniversary of Neil's detention at the Johannesburg Central police station, on 27 November 2013. The group, headed by an old school friend of Aggett, Brian Sandberg, comprised family, friends, and members of the Food and Allied Workers Union, members of the Khulumani Support Group and other NGOs. It aimed "to obtain closure for those closest to Aggett, to champion restorative justice and to develop legacy projects and awareness of Aggett's life work". Sandberg said that it was not just about Aggett, but "about police brutality and a State that acted with impunity and continues to do so". The 1982 inquest records were destroyed at some point, and high-ranking ANC and government officials actively obstructed the prosecution, according to Simon Forbes.

Over the following years, although the National Prosecuting Authority (NPA) had written to the family saying that police were investigating the matter, no arrests were made nor had there been a decision to prosecute. Whitehead died on 23 April 2019, having never been charged with an offence. In May 2019, Minister of Justice Michael Masutha announced that the NPA would reopen the inquest into Aggett's death. However there was a delay, and the NPA only eventually agreed to start the inquest relented after ongoing pressure from the Aggett family as well as the family of Dr Hoosen Haffejee, who had also died in police custody.

=== Second inquest (2020–2022) ===
The High Court re-opened an inquest into Aggett's death on 20 January 2020, 38 years after his death, headed by investigating officer Frank Kgamanyane. Jill Burger, Aggett's sister, told the High Court during the inquest that her brother was killed when the torture went too far. Liz Floyd described "harrowing screams" she heard as she was being detained in another room on the 10th floor of the building. Others who appeared at the inquest included former Security Branch officer Paul Erasmus, along with many former activists and detainees, including Barbara Hogan, Firoz Cachalia, Frank Chikane, Parmananthan Naidoo, and Ronnie Kasrils. Steve Naidoo gave evidence as a pathologist and expert witness.

On 4 March 2022 Judge Motsamai Makume overturned the findings of the 1982 inquest in his ruling in the High Court. After a thorough inquiry based on factual evidence and depositions of former members of the Security Branch and fellow detainees, the court ruled that Aggett did not die by suicide, but was killed by members of the Security Branch in the early hours of the morning on 5 February 1982. This set in motion avenues for the National Prosecuting Authority to prosecute those Security Branch Police officers responsible for his death and the cover-up which followed. Judge Makume referred to Judge Kotze's findings in the original inquest as "a serious error in judgment" and his conclusions as "mind-blowingly weak".

The High Court inquest found that Aggett did not die of hanging but due to crush syndrome caused by beatings and forcible exercise at John Vorster Square. The details were published in the US Journal of Medicine and Public Health.

Surviving records of both inquests are available via the Truth and Reconciliation website.

== Honours and legacy ==
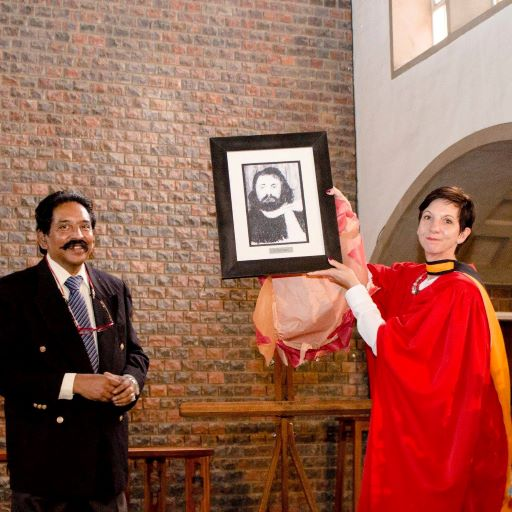
Donating the charcoal image of Neil Aggett by Amitabh Mitra to Kingswood College

Johnny Clegg included a tribute to Aggett in his song, Asimbonanga (Mandela) on the Third World Child album in 1987. Clegg also wrote the song "Siyayilanda" on the Scatterlings album (1982) for Aggett.

George Bizos includes a chapter on the Aggett inquest in the book No One to Blame?: In Pursuit of Justice in South Africa.

Donald McRae reveals how Aggett's death in detention deeply affected himself and his family in his memoir Under Our Skin Death of an Idealist: In Search of Neil Aggett is a fully referenced biography by Beverley Naidoo, with a Foreword by George Bizos

On the 40th anniversary of his death, on 6 February 2022, there was a commemoration to honour Aggett at Westpark Cemetery, organised by the Kathrada Foundation. His de facto widow Liz Floyd addressed the group, and paid tribute to George Bizos, Max Coleman, and Frank Dutton, who fought for justice for Aggett and other detainees. Many other former friends and activists, including Prema Naidoo, attended, and his sister Jill Burger sent a message from the UK.

=== Neil Aggett Labour Studies Unit ===
The Neil Aggett Labour Studies Unit (NALSU) at Rhodes University is named in honour of Aggett.

=== Neil Aggett Memorial Lecture ===
The annual Neil Aggett Memorial Lecture is held at Aggett's old school, Kingswood College. The lecture focuses on memories of Aggett and looks at the concept of injustice and injustice. Amitabh Mitra was a special guest at the 2019 lecture, when he presented the school with a charcoal drawing that he had drawn of Aggett. This drawing is displayed in the Kingswood College Museum.
