= Harry Kim =

Harry Kim may refer to:

- Harry Kim (politician) (born 1939), American politician
- Harry Kim (trumpeter) (1951–2026), American musician
- Harry Kim (Star Trek), a fictional character on the American television series Star Trek: Voyager
