= Thambi =

Thambi (lit. 'Brother' in Tamil) may refer to:

- Thambi (2006 film), an Indian film by Seeman
- Thambi (2019 film), an Indian film by Jeethu Joseph
- Thambi Ramaiah (born 1956), Indian film actor and director
- Thambi Naidoo, South African-Indian civil rights activist
