= List of foreign politicians of Vietnamese origin =

This article contains a list of Wikipedia articles about politicians in countries outside Vietnam who are of Vietnamese origin.

== Australia ==
- Dai Le – Member of Parliament in the House of Representatives
- Phuong Ngo – Deputy Mayor of Fairfield and convicted murderer of New South Wales State MP John Newman
- Tung Ngo – Member of the South Australian Legislative Council
- Sang Nguyen – Member of the Victorian Legislative Council
- Batong Pham – Member of the Western Australian Legislative Council
- Huong Truong – Member of the Victorian Legislative Council

== Canada ==
- Wayne Cao – Member of the Legislative Assembly of Alberta
- Hoang Mai – Shadow Minister of National Revenue (2011-2013)
- Thanh Hai Ngo – Senator from Ontario
- Hung Pham – Member of the Legislative Assembly of Alberta
- Anne Minh-Thu Quach – Member of Parliament in the House of Commons of Canada
- Ève-Mary Thaï Thi Lac – Member of Parliament
- Kevin Vuong – Member of Parliament

== France ==
- Stéphanie Do – Member of the National Assembly
- Olivier Faure – First Secretary of the Socialist Party
- Liêm Hoang-Ngoc – Member of the European Parliament
- Margie Sudre – President of the Regional Council of Réunion (1993-1998)

== Laos ==
- Kaysone Phomvihane – Born Nguyễn Cai Song; 1st General Secretary of the Central Committee of the Lao People's Revolutionary Party (1955-1992), 2nd President of Laos (1991-1992) and 11th Prime Minister of Laos (1975-1991)

== Solomon Islands ==
- Namson Tran – Deputy Speaker of the National Parliament of Solomon Islands (2010-2011)

== United States ==
=== US Congress ===
- Joseph Cao – Representative from Louisiana
- Stephanie Murphy – Representative from Florida

=== State and territory levels ===
- Jerome Cochran – Member of the Tennessee House of Representatives
- Tyler Diep – Member of the California State Assembly
- Bee Nguyen – Member of the Georgia House of Representatives
- Janet Nguyen – Member of the California State Assembly
- Joe Nguyen – Member of the Washington Senate
- Madison Nguyen – Vice Mayor of San Jose, California
- Quang Nguyen – Member of the Arizona House of Representatives
- Rochelle Nguyen – Member of the Nevada Assembly
- Tram Nguyen – Member of the Massachusetts House of Representatives
- Buu Nygren – President of the Navajo Nation
- Khanh Pham – Member of the Oregon House of Representatives
- Tri Ta – Member of the California State Assembly
- My-Linh Thai – Member of the Washington House of Representatives
- Dean Tran – Massachusetts Senate Assistant Minority Whip
- Helen Tran – Mayor of San Bernardino, California
- Kathy Tran – Member of the Virginia House of Delegates
- Van Tran – Member of the California State Assembly
- Hubert Vo – Member of the Texas House of Representatives

== See also ==
- List of heads of state and government of Indian origin
- List of foreign politicians of Chinese origin
- List of foreign politicians of Indian origin
- List of foreign politicians of Japanese origin
- List of foreign politicians of Korean origin
- List of foreign politicians of Iranian origin
