= Larry Tanimoto =

American politician (1945–2025)

Mayor of Hawaii County
- In office April 12, 1990 – December 3, 1990
- Preceded by: Bernard Akana
- Succeeded by: Lorraine Inouye

Personal details
- Born: January 5, 1945 Hilo, Territory of Hawaii, US
- Died: February 27, 2025 (aged 80) Waimea, Hawaii, US
- Party: Republican
- Spouse: Merle Nada Tanimoto
- Children: 2
- Education: University of Hawaiʻi at Mānoa
- Profession: Politician, administrator

Larry Sunao Tanimoto (January 5, 1945 – February 27, 2025) was an American administrator and politician. Tanimoto became the Mayor of Hawaii County in 1990 following the death of Mayor Bernard Akana.

Tanimoto became the managing director of Mayor Bernard Akana's administration following the departure of Akana's previous director, Susan Labrenz. Mayor Akana died of stomach cancer on April 12, 1990, at the age of 70. Tanimoto became the interim Mayor of Hawaii upon Akana's passing. He held the mayoral office for eight months until a special election could be held to fill the remainder of Akana's unexpired term.

Democrat Lorraine Inouye won the special election to succeed Akana and Tanimoto in 1990. She defeated fellow Democrat Stephen K. Yamashiro by just 76 votes in the special election.

Tanimoto died on February 27, 2025 at North Hawaii Community Hospital.
