= Herbert Matayoshi =

American politician and businessman

Mayor of Hawaii County
- In office 1974–1984
- Preceded by: Bruce McCall
- Succeeded by: Megumi Kon

Personal details
- Born: Herbert Tatsuo Matayoshi; November 21, 1928 Hilo, Hawaii, Territory of Hawaii
- Died: July 11, 2011 (aged 82) Honolulu, Hawaii
- Party: Democratic Party
- Education: University of Michigan; University of Hawaiʻi at Mānoa
- Profession: Politician, businessman

Herbert Tatsuo Matayoshi (Japanese: 又吉 辰男, November 21, 1928 – July 11, 2011) was an American politician and businessman. Matayoshi was the mayor of Hawaii County from 1974 to 1984. He was the third Mayor of Hawaii County, as well as its second elected Mayor overall. Matayoshi was also the longest-serving mayor of Hawaii County to date, holding the office for ten years.

== Biography ==
=== Early life ===
A Japanese American, Matayoshi was born on November 21, 1928, in Hilo, on the Big Island of Hawaii. He graduated from Hilo High School in 1946. Matayoshi received in bachelor's degree from the University of Michigan in 1950. He then pursued graduate studies at Temple University in Philadelphia, before completing his Master of Business Administration (MBA) at the University of Hawaiʻi at Mānoa.

Matayoshi worked as a stockbroker by profession.

=== Political career ===
He was elected to the Hawaii County Board of Supervisors, the predecessor of what would become the Hawaii County Council, in 1962. Matayoshi was elected to the newly created Hawaii County Council in 1968, which he held until becoming Mayor in 1974.

=== Mayor of Hawaii ===
In May 1974, Hawaii County's first Mayor Shunichi Kimura resigned following appointment to the 3rd Circuit Court. Kimura's managing director, Bruce McCall, became Mayor following Kimura's resignation until a special election could be held. Herbert Matayoshi, a county councilman at the time, won a special election held a few months later to complete the remainder of the term.

Matayoshi opposed allowing a large number of telescopes at the Mauna Kea Observatory on the summit of Mauna Kea. He also fought the construction of the Prince Kuhio Plaza during the 1970s and 1980s, arguing that the shopping mall would siphon away business from stores in downtown Hilo. Matayoshi dealt with controversy over the expansion of Hilo International Airport during his tenure. The expansion of Hilo's runways expanded the airport to the edge of a Hawaiian Homelands settlement, leading to protests from Native Hawaiian groups. He also mediated a dispute between residents and developers on the Kohala Coast, on the northeast portion if the Big Island. Residents and Native Hawaiian advocated had argued that the development to build resorts in the 1970s of Kohala threatened recreational activities enjoyed by locals.

Matayoshi's managing director during portions of his tenure, Jack Keppeler, told the Honolulu Star Advertiser that Matayoshi sought policies to deliver services to island residents, such as fire and police protection, in a fiscally conservative manner. Another former Hawaii mayor, Lorraine Inouye, noted that Matayoshi's background in business obscured his commitment to environmental protection, in the eyes of some observers. Hawaii Governor Neil Abercrombie credited Matayoshi with implementing many of Hawaii County's major social service programs, including the Elderly Activities Division, championing small businesses and improving the island's infrastructure.

Matayoshi resigned from the mayor's office in 1984, to pursue an unsuccessful candidacy for Hawaii Senate. He lost the state Senate election to Richard Matsuura. His managing director, Megumi Kon, was sworn in to succeed Matayoshi until Dante Carpenter was elected a few months after his resignation.

Herbert Matayoshi died from heart failure at Straub Clinic & Hospital in Honolulu on July 11, 2011, at the age of 82. He was survived by his wife, Mary Y. Matayoshi; daughter, Kathryn; three sons – Jerold, Ronald and Eric; his sister, Edith Harano; eleven grandchildren and one great-grandchild. His daughter, Kathryn Matayoshi, is the superintendent of the Hawaii Department of Education. Another son, Ron Matayoshi, is the director of international programs at the University of Hawaii's School of Social Work. Herbert Matayoshi resided in homes in both Hilo and Kahala, a neighborhood in Honolulu.

Governor Neil Abercrombie ordered all American and Hawaiian flags to be flown at half staff on August 15, 2011, in Matayoshi's honor.
