= Billy Kenoi =

American politician (1968–2021)

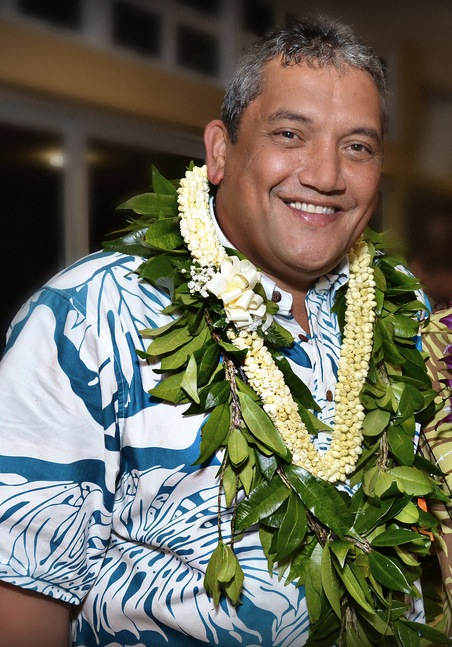

11th Mayor of Hawaii County
- In office December 1, 2008 – December 5, 2016
- Preceded by: Harry Kim
- Succeeded by: Harry Kim

Personal details
- Born: William Kenoi; November 9, 1968 Kalapana, Hawaii, U.S.
- Died: January 26, 2021 (aged 52)
- Party: Democratic
- Spouse: Takako Culhane
- Children: 3
- Education: University of Massachusetts (B.A.); University of Hawaiʻi (J.D.)

William P. (Billy) Kenoi (November 9, 1968 – January 26, 2021) was an American politician who served as Mayor of Hawaii County from 2008 to 2016. Before being elected mayor, Kenoi served as a legislative aide in the State House and State Senate, a law clerk, a deputy public defender, and an Executive Assistant to then-mayor Harry Kim.

== Early life and education ==
Kenoi was born in Kalapana, and attended Waiakea High School. Kenoi attended both Hawaiʻi Community College and University of Hawaiʻi at Hilo, but then transferred to University of Massachusetts Amherst in 1990, and graduated in 1993. Kenoi had transferred through the National Student Exchange program, and later became the NSE's president in his first year there.

In 1992, Kenoi worked as an intern to Senator Daniel K. Inouye, during which time Kenoi attended the Democratic National Convention in New York City.

== Career ==
Upon graduating, Kenoi worked as a Legislative Aide to State Representative Les Ihara Jr. during the 1993 Legislative Session. He then occupied the same position in the State Senate during the 1995 and 1996 sessions. After graduating from the William S. Richardson School of Law at the University of Hawaiʻi at Mānoa in 1996, Kenoi passed the bar exam on his first attempt and then served as a clerk for Judge Richard K. Perkins of the Eighth Division of the First Circuit. Kenoi then worked as a Deputy Public Defender, where he served in the Appellate, Family Court, Juvenile Criminal and Adult Family Court divisions, before finishing his career at the Public Defender's Office at the Circuit Court.

Beginning in 2001, Kenoi served as an Executive Assistant to Hawaii mayor Harry Kim, where he worked to address issues including crystal methamphetamine use, as well as homelessness and housing. He was a member of the Pacific Century Fellows class of 2003.

== Mayor of Hawaii County (2008–2016) ==
Kenoi ran for mayor in 2008. Though Lorraine Inouye initially led in the opinion polls, Kenoi advanced to the general election against Angel Pilago. On November 4, 2008, Kenoi defeated Pilago by a margin of 55.6%–40.9%. At 39, Kenoi became one of the youngest mayors in Big Island history.

Kenoi was re-elected mayor on November 6, 2012, narrowly defeating former mayor Harry Kim, 49.8%–47.6% – a margin of 1,438 votes. Kenoi received praise for his efforts to unite the population of the county during his term as mayor. He spent much time in Hilo and worked to meet the needs of the county's rural community.

On November 1, 2016, Kenoi was found not guilty by a Hawaii Island jury on all charges related to his alleged misuse of a purchasing card issued by Hawaii County. He afterwards apologised for the scandal.

Kenoi reached his term limit after two terms, leaving office in December 2016.

== Illness and death ==
Kenoi revealed in March 2018 that he was diagnosed with myelofibrosis, a bone marrow blood cancer, in 2015 while serving his second term as mayor. The cancer began to accelerate in March 2017 and the former mayor underwent blood transfusions. Later that year, he underwent a bone marrow transplant in California, which involved chemotherapy and months of rehabilitation. He returned home in October 2017 and began feeling better until March 2018, when he reported feeling lethargic. After flying back to California, he was told his cancer had become more aggressive and that he would have only a month to live without aggressive chemotherapy.

Kenoi died on January 26, 2021, at the age of 52.
