= Harry Kim (politician) =

American politician

Mayor of Hawaii County
- In office December 5, 2016 – December 7, 2020
- Preceded by: Billy Kenoi
- Succeeded by: Mitch Roth
- In office December 4, 2000 – December 1, 2008
- Preceded by: Stephen Yamashiro
- Succeeded by: Billy Kenoi

Personal details
- Born: 1939 (age 86–87) ‘Ola‘a, Territory of Hawaii, U.S.
- Party: Independent
- Spouse: Bobbie Kim
- Children: 2 sons
- Education: Southern Oregon State University
- Profession: Civil Defense Director (retired)

Military service
- Allegiance: United States
- Branch/service: United States Army
- Battles/wars: Vietnam War

Harry Kim (born 1939) is an American politician who was the mayor of Hawaii County, from 2000 to 2008 and 2016 to 2020. Before serving as mayor, he was the county's civil defense director.

== Early life ==
Kim was born to Korean-American immigrants, the youngest of eight children. He was raised in ‘Ola‘a in what was then the Territory of Hawaii (now Keaʻau, Hawaii). They resided in a one-bedroom house with no electricity or running water. He and his siblings would often work for the family business and perform other chores to the point where he was surprised when he learned of a typical weekend.

He attended ʻOla'a School and Hilo High School. He then attended the University of Hawaii at Hilo and graduated from Southern Oregon State University. He served in the United States Army as a medic and was a teacher and coach. Kim served for 16 years as County Director of Civil Defense. As Director, Kim would go on the radio and would update the residents of Hawai'i.

== First tenure as Mayor ==
Kim announced his candidacy for the Republican nomination for mayor in 2000. After defeating Democrat turned Republican State Representative Harvey Tajiri in the primary Kim won the general election with 50% of the vote. His opponents, Democratic candidate Fred Holschuh and Green Party candidate Keiko Bonk received 30 and 20 percent, respectively.

In 2004, Kim ran for a second term, easily winning reelection.

While Kim first ran for mayor as a Republican, he considers himself nonpartisan. Until he ran for mayor, his only visible political activity had been backing Democratic mayor Lorraine Inouye. In 2006, prominent Democrats including former Governor Ben Cayetano, then-U.S. Representatives Neil Abercrombie and party chairman Mike McCartney encouraged Kim to run for governor against Linda Lingle. On July 22, 2006, shortly before the filing deadline, he removed his name from consideration.

During his first eight years in office, Kim advocated, among other initiatives, recycling projects and the creation of a new County office complex in the place of the defunct Kaikoʻo Mall.

== Hawaii mayoral election, 2012 ==
In 2012, Kim ran for mayor once more against his successor, Billy Kenoi. Kim lost by 1,438 votes, earning 49% to Kenoi's 51%.

== Return to the Mayor's office ==
In the wake of Kenoi's alleged misuse of a purchasing card issued by Hawaii County, Kim said on Thursday, March 3, 2016, that he had decided to run again, this time on a campaign to restore trust in government. He was elected mayor in primary voting on August 13, 2016, when he received more than 50% of the votes cast in a field of 13 candidates, thereby avoiding a runoff election in November. In keeping with a commitment he had made in every campaign to accept no more than a $10 donation from any individual, Kim spent a total of $21,931 in 2016, for a per-vote cost of $1.06. His nearest competitor spent $220,289, for a per-vote cost of $22.11. Kim lost his race for a fourth term as mayor in August, 2020, and his term ended in early December. Former Hawaii County Prosecutor Mitch Roth defeated Ikaika Marzo to succeed Kim as County Mayor.

On June 5, 2018, Hawaii County officials confirmed that a home Kim owned in Vacationland Hawaii was claimed by the lava flow from the 2018 lower Puna eruption of Kīlauea.
