= List of foreign politicians of Iranian origin =

This article contains a list of Wikipedia articles about politicians in countries outside Iran who are of Iranian origin.

== Canada ==
- Ali Ehsassi – Member of the House of Commons of Canada
- Goldie Ghamari – Member of the Legislative Assembly of Ontario
- Majid Jowhari – Member of the House of Commons
- Amir Khadir – Member of the National Assembly of Quebec
- Reza Moridi – Member of the Legislative Assembly of Ontario
- Michael Parsa – Associate Minister of Housing of Ontario

== France ==
- Pouria Amirshahi - Member of the National Assembly

== Germany ==
- Bijan Djir-Sarai - Member of the Bundestag
- Nargess Eskandari-Grünberg - Mayor of Frankfurt
- Yasmin Fahimi - Member of the Bundestag
- Parsa Marvi - Member of the Bundestag
- Niema Movassat - Member of the Bundestag
- Michaela Noll - Member of the Bundestag
- Omid Nouripour - Leader of Alliance 90/The Greens
- Sahra Wagenknecht - Leader of the Opposition in the Bundestag (2015–2017) and of Die Linke in the Bundestag (2015–2019)

== Israel ==
- Eliezer Avtabi - Member of the Knesset
- Michael Ben-Ari - Member of the Knesset
- Moshe Katsav - President of Israel (2000–2007)
- Shaul Mofaz - Chief of Staff of the Israel Defense Forces (1998–2002), Defence Minister (2002–2006) and Deputy Prime Minister (2006–2009, 2012)

== Netherlands ==
- Ulysse Ellian – Member of the House of Representatives
- Farah Karimi – Member of the House of Representatives

== New Zealand ==
- Golriz Ghahraman – Member of the New Zealand Parliament

== Norway ==
- Masud Gharahkhani – President of the Storting
- Mazyar Keshvari – Member of the Storting

== Sweden ==
- Alireza Akhondi – Member of the Riksdag
- Minoo Akhtarzand – Governor of Jönköping County (2010–2016) and Governor of Västmanland County (2016-present)
- Hanif Bali – Member of the Riksdag
- Nooshi Dadgostar – Leader of the Left Party (2020–present)
- Ali Esbati – Member of the Riksdag
- Shadieh Heydari – Member of the Riksdag
- Reza Khelili Dylami – Member of the Riksdag
- Parisa Liljestrand – Minister of Culture (2022–present)
- Romina Pourmokhtari – Minister for the Environment (2022–present)
- Daniel Riazat – Member of the Riksdag
- Azadeh Rojhan Gustafsson – Member of the Riksdag
- Ardalan Shekarabi – Minister for Public Administration (2014–2019) and Minister for Social Security (2019–2022)
- Maryam Yazdanfar – Member of the Riksdag

== United Kingdom ==
- Haleh Afshar, Baroness Afshar - Member of the House of Lords
- David Alliance, Baron Alliance - Member of the House of Lords
- Seema Kennedy - Conservative MP and Parliamentary Undersecretary
- Ali Milani - Member of Labour Party

== United States ==
=== US Congress ===
- Yassamin Ansari – Representative from Arizona
- Stephanie Bice – Representative from Oklahoma

=== State and territory levels ===
- Raumesh Akbari – Member of the Tennessee Senate and House of Representatives
- Dalya Attar – Member of the Maryland House of Delegates
- Jimmy Delshad – Mayor of Beverly Hills, California (2007–2008, 2010–2011)
- Anna Eskamani – Member of the Florida House of Representatives
- Darya Farivar – Member of the Washington House of Representatives
- Rey Garofano – Member of the Vermont House of Representatives
- Haraz Ghanbari – Member of the Ohio House of Representatives
- Cyrus Habib – Lieutenant Governor of Washington (2017–2021)
- Anna Kaplan – Member of the New York Senate
- Zahra Karinshak – Member of the Georgia Senate
- Ross Mirkarimi – Sheriff of San Francisco (2012, 2012–2016)
- Adrin Nazarian – Member of the California State Assembly
- Bob Yousefian – Mayor of Glendale, California (2004–2005)

== See also ==
- List of heads of state and government of Indian origin
- List of foreign politicians of Chinese origin
- List of foreign politicians of Korean origin
- List of foreign politicians of Indian origin
- List of foreign politicians of Japanese origin
- List of foreign politicians of Vietnamese origin
