= George Naicker =

George Naicker (1 June 1919 – 8 April 1998) was a prominent South African anti-apartheid activist of Indian Tamil descent. In 1964 he was imprisoned on Robben Island, where he was involved in news gathering.

== Biography ==
George Naicker was born on 1 June 1919 into a family of six sons. In 1941 he joined the Natal Indian Congress.

Billy Nair, whose association with Naicker dated from 1950 when he was a branch member of the Seaview, Bellair, Hilary and Umhlatuzana area of the Natal Indian Congress, says that Naicker was a delegate to the Congress of the People and joined the South African Communist Party in 1955/56, i.e. in its illegal period. The party had been banned at the time by the South African government.

=== Incarceration on Robben Island ===
Prior to his arrest in July, 1963 he was employed as a legal clerk at the late G.S. Naidoo's office in Queen Street. While the constitution of the ANC made membership exclusive to Africans, Naicker witnessed oppression towards Africans in his daily life while working in a legal office. Naicker had an established presence in Ndabazabantu courts. Long after he was imprisoned in Robben Island his clients would at times search for him, not believing that he was in prison.

Sunny Singh (ex-Robben Islander) states that he met Naicker of NIC Youth Congress and was a Youth Delegate to the World Youth Festival (in Hungary).

In 1964, charged with sabotage and other charges, he was sentenced to long terms of imprisonment. On Robben Island, Naicker and Sunny Singh were responsible for smuggling newspapers into the prison. He took part in the celebrations to honour the USSR on the 7 November every year under the noses of the warders. He suffered the extreme pain and indignity of a straitjacket.

=== Release ===
Naicker served his 14-year sentence to the day and returned home to further restrictions and house arrest orders on the 28 February 1978. The imposition of punishment by the courts did not satisfy police officers. They imposed further restrictions on his release, while Archie Gumede employed him on his release.

Today many peacetime activists have surfaced, but Naicker through the organisations he worked in challenged the might of the Nationalist party, incurred their wrath and took whatever punishment was meted out. He never capitulated on the Freedom Charter.

MK structures outside the country found that a police agent had infiltrated ANC ranks. It as decided to remove Ebi and Naicker from the country in 1980. The only description of Naicker MK had was his very small feet.

=== ANC return of home ===
When members of the African National Congress started to return home in 1990, Naicker remained at his post in Lusaka to continue his work.

George Naicker weighed at most 50kg and wore size 4 shoes.

Naicker died in 1998 in Durban, KwaZulu-Natal, South Africa.
