= National Transformation Movement =

Political party in Trinidad and Tobago

The National Transformation Movement (NTM) refers to two political parties in Trinidad and Tobago, one led by businessman Mohammed Faisal Rahman which contested the 1995 General Elections and is currently moribund, another, led by retired Industrial Court judge Lloyd Elcock.

The original NTM contested two seats in the 1995 general elections using the Banyan tree as its symbol. The party was unsuccessful and has been inactive since then.

The new NTM was launched by retired Industrial Court Judge Lloyd Elcock on 1 February 2006. At the party's launch Elcock listed a four-point plan designed the reduce the nation's rapidly growing crime rate. Its symbol is the simply the letters 'NTM'.

Soon after the new NTM's launch Rahman claimed that he had "copyrighted" the name National Transformation Movement and so the new party could not claim that name. The Elections and Boundaries Commission (EBC) responded that they only registered party symbols, and as the two parties have very different symbols there would be no confusion on a ballot slip. (Party symbols, not names, appear on ballots next to the candidates. Some parties have gotten around this by placing their names or initials in their party symbol.) Elcock also responded that he would purchase the rights to the name, if Rahman was willing to sell.
