= Bernard Akana =

American engineer and politician

Bernard Kanenaulii Akana

Mayor of Hawaii County
- In office 1988 – April 12, 1990
- Preceded by: Dante Carpenter
- Succeeded by: Larry Tanimoto

Personal details
- Born: June 20, 1919
- Died: April 12, 1990 (age 70) Hilo, Hawaii
- Party: Republican
- Profession: Politician, engineer

Bernard Kanenaulii Akana (June 20, 1919 – April 12, 1990) was an American engineer and politician. He served as the Mayor of Hawaii County from 1988 until his death on April 12, 1990.

Akana worked for the Hawaii Electric Light Company as a design planner before his retirement. He unsuccessfully ran as a perennial candidate for elected office on ten separate elections over the course of twenty years before being elected Mayor of Hawaii County in 1988.

In 1988, Akana challenged incumbent Democratic Hawaii County Mayor Dante Carpenter in the mayoral election. Akana, a Republican, was considered a long shot candidate for the office. He "threw no fund-raisers, made no campaign promises, sought no union endorsements and spent only $1,660." However, on November 8, 1988, Akana pulled off an upset victory by unseating Carpenter in the election. He was sworn into office in 1988.

Akana died of stomach cancer while in office on April 12, 1990, in Hilo, Hawaii, at the age of 70. Akana's managing director, Larry Tanimoto, became acting Mayor of Hawaii upon his death. Tanimoto remained in office for eight months until a special mayoral election could be held to fill the remainder of Akana's term in office.

Lorraine Inouye, a member of the Hawaii County Council, was elected to succeed Akana for the remainder of his term. She defeated her nearest rival, Stephen Yamashiro, by just 76 votes to become mayor.
