= Indres Naidoo =

South African anti-apartheid activist

Member of the Senate of South Africa
- In office 1994-1999

Personal details
- Born: Indres Elatchininathan Naidoo; 26 August 1936 Pretoria, South Africa
- Died: 8 January 2016 (aged 80)
- Parent(s): Roy Naidoo and Ama Naidoo
- Relatives: Shanti Naidoo (sister); Thambi Naidoo (grandfather)

Indres Elatchininathan Naidoo (26 August 1936 – 8 January 2016) was a South African anti-apartheid activist. An early member of the people's liberation army, Umkhonto we Sizwe, Naidoo served 10 years in prison on Robben Island for sabotage between 1963 and 1973. After his release from prison, Naidoo played a leading role in the revival of the struggle in the 1970s until he was obliged to go into exile in 1977. He served the African National Congress (ANC) in Mozambique and in the German Democratic Republic. The ANC was unbanned in 1990, and Naidoo returned to South Africa the following year. When the ANC won the 1994 general election, Naidoo was appointed to the Senate and served in Parliament until 1999. In 2014, Naidoo was awarded the Order of Mendi for Bravery in Silver.

Indres Naidoo was the son of Roy Naidoo and Manonmoney “Ama” Naidoo, grandson of Thambi Naidoo, and brother of Shanthie Naidoo and Prema Naidoo.
