= Stephen K. Yamashiro =

American politician (1941–2011)

Stephen Yamashiro

Mayor of Hawaii County
- In office December 7, 1992 – December 2000
- Preceded by: Lorraine Inouye
- Succeeded by: Harry Kim

Personal details
- Born: Stephen Kim Yamashiro; July 15, 1941 Honolulu, Territory of Hawaii, U.S.
- Died: May 24, 2011 (aged 69) Hilo, Hawaii, U.S.
- Party: Democratic
- Spouse: Della E. Allison
- Education: University of Hawaiʻi; Willamette University
- Profession: Politician, lawyer

Stephen Kei Yamashiro (July 15, 1941 – May 24, 2011) was an American politician and lawyer who served as the former Mayor of Hawaii County from 1992 to 2000. Yamashiro served on the Hawaii County council from 1976 to 1990, including eleven years as the council's chairman. He then served as the Mayor of Hawaii for two consecutive, four-year terms from 1992 until 2000.

The Honolulu Star-Bulletin has referred to Yamashiro as "among the most influential political leaders" in the history of the Big Island of Hawaii. More specifically, Honolulu Star-Bulletin reporter Hugh Clark has called Yamashiro, "probably … the most significant newsmaker on the Big Island" during the final thirty years of the 20th century.

== Biography ==
=== Early years ===
A Japanese American, Yamashiro was born on July 15, 1941, in Honolulu, Hawaii. He attended University Elementary School and graduated from the Punahou School in 1959. In 1964, Yamashiro also graduated from the U.S. Army Artillery Officer's Candidate School, located at Fort Sill in Oklahoma.

He received a bachelor's degree from the University of Hawaiʻi at Mānoa in 1965 and a law degree from Willamette University College of Law in Salem, Oregon in 1969.

=== Political career ===
Yamashiro worked as the Hawaii State Deputy Attorney General. Yamashiro began his career in Hawaii County government as a deputy corporation legal counsel for Hawaii County. He was then employed by the Hawaii Public Employment Relations Board as a Hearings Officer.

Yamashiro was elected to the Hawaii County Council from 1976 to 1990. He served as the chairman of the county council simultaneously for eleven of those years.

=== Mayor of Hawaii County ===
Former Mayor of Hawaii Bernard Akana died in office on April 12, 1990. Akana's death necessitated a special election to fill the remainder of Akana's unexpired term. Yamashiro left the council and announced his candidacy for Mayor of Hawaii County. Yamshiro was defeated in the 1990 special election by Lorraine Inouye, who won the election by just 76 votes.

Two years later, Yamashiro was elected Mayor of Hawaii County in 1992 in a rematch against incumbent Mayor Lorraine Inouye. He also defeated Russell Kokubun, who had also served on the county council, in the 1992 mayoral election. Though rivals in the election, Kokuban became deputy planning director for several years during Yamashiro's tenure as mayor.

He was inaugurated into office on December 7, 1992. Yamashiro was re-elected to a second, four-year term in 1996, defeating challenger Keiko Bonk of the Green Party by a slimmer than expected margin of 3,148 votes.

Yamashiro came into office facing major economic challenges for the Big Island of Hawaii. The island's once thriving sugar industry had declined, causing the loss of agricultural jobs. The last major sugarcane plantation closed on the island closed during the 1990s. Yamashiro, a strong proponent of development, pushed for the rapid development of resorts and other tourism infrastructure in South Kohala and North Kona to replace jobs lost in the sugar industry.

Yamshiro is credited with introducing the 100% Kona coffee emblem and logo now widely used by Kona Coffee producers on the Big Island. He expanded the tourism industry between Japan and the Big Island of Hawaii. Yamashiro spearheaded efforts to recruit the U.S. Immigration and Customs Enforcement to open an office and international service at Kona International Airport. He also successfully lobbied for nonstop, international flights between Kona and Narita International Airport by Japan Airlines.

He also considered an advocate for the Big Island of Hawaii's agricultural industry, the University of Hawaiʻi and the island's film industry.

In 2000, Yamashiro could not seek re-election due to term limits. He was succeeded by Harry Kim in December 2000. Yamashiro left Hawaii County with a budget surplus.

=== Post-Mayoral career ===
Republican Governor Linda Lingle appointed Yamashiro to the Hawaii Tourism Authority. Lingle later reappointed Yamashiro to a second, four-year term on the tourism authority. He served as the chairman of the Hawaii Tourism Authority's budget committee. Additionally, the Western United Life Assurance Company hired him as project manager to promote its planned residential development in Hilo. It was never built.

Yamashiro died from pneumonia at Hilo Medical Center in Hilo, Hawaii, on May 24, 2011, aged 69. He was survived by his wife, Della E. Allison.
