= Mai Yamada =

Politician of Taiwan

- 山田摩衣
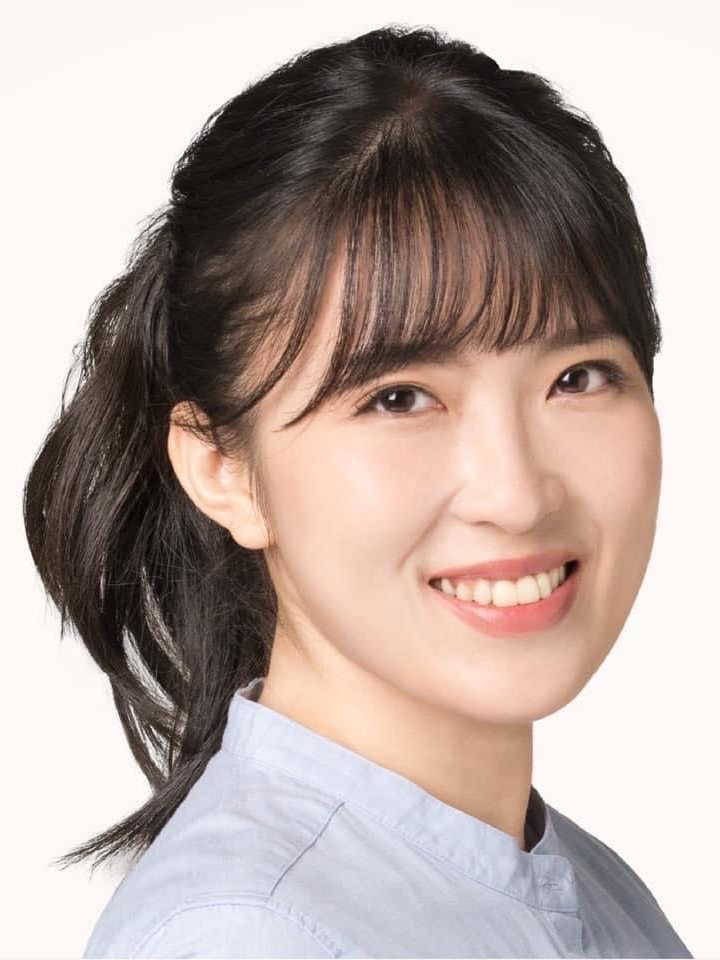
- Official portrait, 2022

New Taipei City Councillor
- Incumbent
- Assumed office 25 December 2022
- Constituency: 5th District (Banqiao)

Personal details
- Born: January 10, 1990 (age 36) Taipei County, Taiwan
- Party: Democratic Progressive Party
- Education: Chinese Culture University (BA); National Chengchi University (MA)

Mai Yamada (Chinese: 山田摩衣; pinyin: Shāntián Móyī) is a Taiwanese politician who has been a member of the New Taipei City Council since 2022.

== Early life and education ==
Mai was born to a Taiwanese mother and Japanese father from Toyama Prefecture. Her father died when she was a child. She was a child actor for years.

Mai graduated from Chinese Culture University with a bachelor's degree in English and earned a master's degree in sociology from National Chengchi University. As an undergraduate in college, she had been involved in politics.

== Early careers ==
She used to work at the office of Kao Jyh-peng (高志鵬), a Democratic Progressive Party (DPP) lawmaker where she became the deputy director. She also served as the campaign assistant of Yu Tian for the Legislative Yuan by-election in 2019. She was the secretary of Legislative Yuan President You Si-kun.

== Political careers ==
In autumn 2021, Mai decided to join the local election of 2022. She was then elected as the councilor of New Taipei City Council after the 2022 Republic of China local election on 26 December 2022 under the DPP.

== Personal life ==
Mai is fluent in Mandarin, English and Japanese. She also learned Hokkien.
