= Ahmed Kathrada Foundation =

South African-based foundation promoting non-racialism

- Founded: 2008; 18 years ago
- Founders: Ahmed Kathrada
- Type: Nonprofit organization
- Purpose: Civil Rights; Activism; Good governance Non-racialism
- Location: 19 Guinea-Fowl Street, Lenasia, Gauteng, South Africa
- Region served: South Africa
- Website: www.kathradafoundation.org

The Ahmed Kathrada Foundation is a South African-based foundation the seeks to promote non-racialism and the principles within both the Freedom Charter and the South African Constitution. It is named after anti-apartheid activist, political prisoner, and politician Ahmed Kathrada. The foundation was founded by Ahmed Kathrada in 2008.

== Activities ==
The foundation has released a number of statements critical of South African politicians who have engaged in alleged acts of corruption and state capture and calling for action to be taken against them. The foundation has also made statements and taken action against individual instances of racism in South Africa as part of its overall focus to prevent racism generally in society. This includes calling the South African Human Rights Commission to take action against people who make overtly racist remarks in addition to setting up the Anti-Racism Network South Africa (ARNSA).

Memorials to remember anti-apartheid activist and trade unionist, Neil Aggett, have been organised by the Kathrada Foundation.
