= Wolfgang Dourado =

Wolfgang Dourado was a former attorney general, and later Chief Justice, of Zanzibar.

After the 1964 Zanzibar Revolution, Dourado chose to remain behind and support the Revolutionary Government as other Goans fled.
