= Mohammed Faisal Rahman =

Politician from Trinidad and Tobago

Mohammed Faisal Rahman was a Trinidadian writer and politician.

Rahman wrote several books on economics, business and religion. In 1995 he founded the National Transformation Movement. Rahman was appointed Senator on 17 December 2007 by the United National Congress. His term ended 8 April 2010.

Rahman died at age 72 on 17 September 2012.
