= Mayor of Hawaiʻi County =

Political office in the United States

- Incumbent; Kimo Alameda since December 2, 2024
- Term length: 4 years
- Inaugural holder: Shunichi Kimura
- Formation: 1968
- Salary: $199,068
- Website: https://www.hawaiicounty.gov/our-county/mayor

The mayor of Hawaiʻi is the chief executive officer of the County of Hawaiʻi in the state of Hawaii. The mayor has municipal jurisdiction over the Big Island of Hawaiʻi. The current mayor is Kimo Alameda. The mayor of Hawaiʻi County is the successor of the Royal Governors of Hawaiʻi Island of the Kingdom of Hawaiʻi.

As of 2004, the mayor is officially a nonpartisan position, and appears on the ballot without a party affiliation. The managing director takes over as mayor in the event of a mayor's death or resignation.

== History ==
Hawaii County began electing a mayor in 1968, when the present form of charter government was instituted. For most of the 20th century, elected members of the Board of Supervisors, precursor to the Hawaii County Council, chose the chairman, and that chairman was essentially the chief operating officer of Hawaii County. That changed in 1964, a year after Act 73 of the 1963 Legislature, which enabled counties to draft their own charters. Former Honolulu deputy County Corporation Counsel Shunichi Kimura was elected the last county chairman in 1964, and the county elected its first mayor in 1968. Bruce McCall (1976), Megumi Kon (1984) and Larry Tanimoto (1990) all filled out the last few months of their predecessor's terms, in the case of Tanimoto, for Bernard Akana, who died of cancer less than two years into his term. Lorraine Inouye then won a special election to serve out Akana's last two years.

== List of mayors ==
No.	Term in office	Name	Party
1	January 3, 1969 - May 16, 1974	Shunichi Kimura ^{1}	Democratic
2	May 16, 1974 - December 2, 1974	Bruce McCall ^{1}	Democratic
3	December 2, 1974 - July 24, 1984	Herbert Matayoshi ^{2}	Democratic
4	July 24, 1984 - December 3, 1984	Megumi Kon ^{2}	Democratic
5	December 3, 1984 - December 5, 1988	Dante Keala Carpenter	Democratic
6	December 5, 1988 - April 12, 1990	Bernard Akana^{3} †	Republican
7	April 12, 1990 - December 3, 1990	Larry Tanimoto ^{3}	Republican
8	December 3, 1990 - December 7, 1992	Lorraine Inouye	Democratic
9	December 7, 1992 - December 4, 2000	Stephen Kei Yamashiro	Democratic
10	December 4, 2000 - December 1, 2008	Harry Kim	Republican ^{4}
11	December 1, 2008 - December 5, 2016	Billy Kenoi	Democratic ^{4}
12	December 5, 2016 - December 7, 2020	Harry Kim	Republican ^{4}
13	December 7, 2020 - December 2, 2024	Mitch Roth	Independent ^{4}
14	December 2, 2024 - Incumbent	Kimo Alameda	Democratic ^{4} ^{5}

=== Notes ===
1. Shunichi Kimura resigned to become a circuit court judge. He was replaced by his managing director, Bruce McCall.
2. Herbert Matayoshi resigned to run for a seat on the Hawaii Senate. He was replaced by his managing director, Megumi Kon.
3. Bernard Akana died of cancer while in office. He was replaced by his managing director, Larry Tanimoto.
4. As of the 2004 elections, mayoral candidates are officially listed on the ballot without party affiliation.
5. Kimo Alameda is a registered Democrat but identifies as a 'conservative.'
