= Keiko Bonk =

American politician (born 1954)

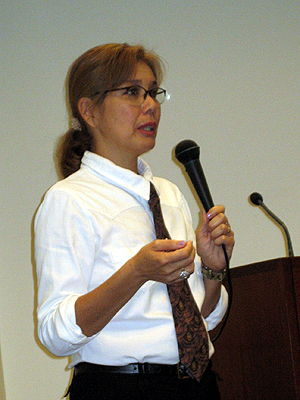
- Keiko Bonk in 2007

Hawaii County Council Member
- In office 1992–1996

Personal details
- Party: Green Party of Hawaii
- Education: University of Hawaii Manoa, Hunter College
- Occupation: Politician, painter, singer

Keiko Cecilia Bonk (born July 13, 1954) is an American artist, musician, environmental advocate and former politician from Hawaiʻi. She was a co-founder of the Green Party of Hawaiʻi and served on the Hawaiʻi County Council from 1992 to 1996, including as council chair from 1995 to 1996. Her election in November 1992 made her the first Green Party candidate in the United States to win a partisan public office.

In addition to her political career, Bonk has worked as a painter and musician in New York City and Hawaiʻi. Her artwork has appeared in exhibitions associated with New York's East Village art movement, and one of her works is held in Columbia University's Art Properties collection. She has also been active in environmental conservation, particularly the protection of native Hawaiian forests, marine ecosystems and endangered wildlife.

== Early life and education ==
Bonk was born in Honolulu, Hawaiʻi, on July 13, 1954, to William Bonk, an archaeologist and anthropologist, and Fumie Matsuoka. Her parents were active in Hawaiʻi Democratic Party politics. Her father conducted archaeological research on early Polynesian settlement in Hawaiʻi, including work at South Point on the island of Hawaiʻi.

Bonk grew up primarily on the island of Hawaiʻi, although her family lived in Illinois from 1960 to 1963 while her father taught at the University of Illinois. She attended Hilo High School, graduating in 1972. She received a Bachelor of Fine Arts degree from the University of Hawaiʻi at Mānoa in 1976 and a Master of Fine Arts degree from Hunter College in New York City in 1982.

Bonk became involved in political and environmental activism as a teenager. While in eighth grade, she organized a fundraising dance for U.S. Representative Patsy Mink. She subsequently participated in Save Our Surf, a Hawaiʻi environmental organization that opposed coastal development projects, including a proposed breakwater at Kaimū Bay.

During the early 1970s, she also participated in efforts to protect agricultural land and oppose development in rural communities on Oʻahu.

== Artistic and musical career ==
==== New York City ====
Bonk began her professional artistic career in the late 1970s. She taught art in Berkeley, California, from 1978 to 1980 before moving to New York City, where she worked as an art gallery assistant from 1981 to 1983. During the 1980s, she exhibited paintings and other artwork while also performing as a musician.

Bonk participated in New York's East Village art scene during a period of increasing attention to emerging artists working outside the city's established commercial gallery system.

In 1984, her work was included in Climbing, a group exhibition at Hal Bromm Gallery in Tribeca. The exhibition featured 25 artists, including David Wojnarowicz, Kiki Smith, Martin Wong, Judy Glantzman, Greer Lankton, Rick Prol and Walter Robinson. Hal Bromm Gallery subsequently identified the exhibition as a significant presentation of artists associated with the East Village movement.

That same year, Bonk was included in Limbo, a group exhibition at MoMA PS1 in New York, held from January 22 to March 18, 1984.

Bonk continued exhibiting throughout the 1980s and 1990s. A 2000 profile in the Honolulu Star-Bulletin reported that she had participated in more than 60 exhibitions in the United States and abroad between 1981 and 1998.

Her work was included in Vintage East Village, a 2005 survey exhibition organized by artist Rick Prol at Hal Bromm Gallery. The exhibition revisited the East Village art scene of the early 1980s.

In 2015, Bonk was among more than 130 artists represented in 40: The Anniversary Exhibition, commemorating the fortieth anniversary of Hal Bromm Gallery.

=== Artwork in public collections ===
Bonk's 1985 work Lost Summer, made with ink, watercolor and silver paint on paper, is held in the Art Properties collection of Columbia University in New York City. The work entered the university collection in 2014 as a gift from Dr. Monroe and Mrs. Edna Kornfeld.

=== Music ===
Alongside her painting career, Bonk performed as a vocalist with New York rock bands during the 1980s, including His Master's Voice and Cosmic Oven. She performed with these groups while continuing her work as a visual artist.

After returning to Hawaiʻi, she continued composing and performing music. By 2009, she was performing with the band Kazan while maintaining her painting practice and environmental advocacy work.

=== Return to Hawaiʻi ===
Bonk returned to Hawaiʻi in 1991 after approximately 15 years away. Following her return, she continued to exhibit her artwork and became involved in community arts organizations and educational activities.

From 1997 to 2000, she worked as an art lecturer at the University of Hawaiʻi at Hilo.

In 2009, her paintings were included in Existential Pilgrims: Recent Work by Duane Preble, Noe Tanigawa, Russell Sunabe and Keiko Bonk, a group exhibition at the Academy Art Center at Linekona in Honolulu. The exhibition presented work by four Hawaiʻi artists involved in the state's cultural and artistic communities.

== Political career ==
==== Founding of the Green Party of Hawaiʻi ====
Bonk was among the founders of the Green Party of Hawaiʻi, which emerged in 1990 as part of the development of Green political organizations in the United States.

After returning to Hawaiʻi in 1991, she became involved in local disputes over government transparency, public participation and land use. Her opposition to a proposal to move public testimony to the end of Hawaiʻi County Council meetings helped prompt her decision to seek public office.

==== Hawaiʻi County Council, 1992–1996 ====
In the November 3, 1992, election, Bonk won a seat on the Hawaiʻi County Council representing the Upper Puna–Kaʻū–South Kona district. Running as a Green Party candidate in a partisan election, she received 3,141 votes, or 54.6 percent of the vote.

Her victory was the first electoral success by a Green Party candidate in a partisan public office in the United States. Earlier Green candidates had won local nonpartisan offices, but Bonk's election demonstrated the party's ability to win a contest in which candidates appeared on the ballot with political party affiliations.

Bonk was reelected in November 1994 and served a second two-year term. She became chair of the Hawaiʻi County Council in 1995, serving in that position through 1996.

During her council service, Bonk focused on environmental protection, land-use policy, agriculture and public access to government information.

Her work included efforts to reform property-tax assessments on native forests and to encourage conservation through tax policy. At the 1996 Hawaiʻi Forest Industry Symposium, she presented a paper titled Real Property Tax Assessments of Native Forest in Hawaiʻi County, discussing the relationship between property taxation, forest conservation and landowner incentives.

In a 2000 interview with the Honolulu Star-Bulletin, Bonk identified reductions in property taxes on native forests, incentives for certain agricultural practices and measures promoting public access to government information among the accomplishments of her council service.

==== Mayoral campaigns ====
Bonk did not seek another term on the County Council in 1996. Instead, she ran for mayor of Hawaiʻi County as the Green Party candidate.

In the November 5, 1996, election, she finished second to incumbent Democratic Mayor Stephen K. Yamashiro. Yamashiro received 19,807 votes, or 39.2 percent, while Bonk received 16,659 votes, or 33.0 percent. Republican candidate Jim Rath finished third with 11,724 votes, or 23.2 percent.

Bonk ran for mayor again in 2000. Her campaign emphasized government accountability, economic diversification, environmental protection and efforts to balance economic development with conservation.

In the November 7, 2000, election, Republican Harry Kim won with 25,269 votes, or 49.2 percent. Democrat Fred Holschuh finished second with 14,981 votes, or 29.2 percent, and Bonk finished third with 9,998 votes, or 19.5 percent.

==== Later political activities ====
Bonk remained involved in Hawaiʻi politics after leaving elected office.

In 2012, she was the Green Party candidate for the Hawaiʻi House of Representatives in District 20, which included parts of Kaimukī, Pālolo and St. Louis Heights on Oʻahu. She challenged longtime Democratic legislator Calvin Say.

In the November 6, 2012, general election, Say received 5,704 votes, Bonk received 3,143 votes and Republican Julia Allen received 1,179 votes.

Following the election, Bonk supported efforts by the Green Party of Hawaiʻi to investigate ballot shortages at Oʻahu polling places. A December 2012 Honolulu Civil Beat report described litigation brought by the party and several voters seeking changes to state election procedures following problems distributing sufficient paper ballots.

Bonk again ran for House District 20 in 2014 as the Green Party candidate. In a candidate questionnaire published by Honolulu Civil Beat, she emphasized environmental protection, transparent government, campaign-finance reform, sustainable development and community participation in planning decisions.

In the November 4, 2014, general election, Say was reelected with 4,624 votes. Bonk finished second with 2,047 votes, ahead of Republican Julia Allen, who received 1,795 votes.

== Environmental advocacy ==
==== Forest conservation and land-use policy ====
Environmental conservation has been a recurring focus of Bonk's public career, beginning with her involvement in coastal protection campaigns during her youth.

As a Hawaiʻi County Council member, she advocated changes to property-tax policies that had historically encouraged the clearing of forested land for agricultural or other uses. Her 1996 symposium paper discussed the effects of tax assessments based on a property's potential market value and examined the use of tax incentives to encourage landowners to retain native forests.

Her broader political work also addressed farmland preservation, sustainable agriculture and public involvement in land-use decisions.

==== Northwestern Hawaiian Islands ====
During the 2000s, Bonk became involved in efforts to strengthen marine conservation protections in the Northwestern Hawaiian Islands.

In 2006, she served as campaign director of the Honolulu-based Northwestern Hawaiian Islands Network. She was also identified in contemporary reporting as head of the Hawaiʻi Audubon Society's Northwestern Hawaiian Islands campaign.

The campaign took place during a broader effort by conservation organizations, Native Hawaiian groups, scientists and public officials to establish permanent protections for the islands, atolls, coral reefs and surrounding waters.

In June 2006, President George W. Bush established the Northwestern Hawaiian Islands Marine National Monument under the Antiquities Act. The monument was subsequently renamed Papahānaumokuākea Marine National Monument.

Bonk welcomed the designation while emphasizing the importance of ensuring that the new monument retained strong conservation protections. Her comments were reported in The Honolulu Advertiser and in a 2006 article published by the Pew Charitable Trusts.

==== Marine Conservation Biology Institute and monk seal protection ====
Bonk subsequently served as Hawaiʻi programs director of the Marine Conservation Biology Institute, a nonprofit organization focused on protecting marine ecosystems through science and public policy.

In February 2008, she testified before the Hawaiʻi State Senate Committee on Water and Land in support of legislation establishing bag limits for ornamental aquarium fish. In her testimony, Bonk advocated resource-management measures designed to support the long-term sustainability of marine populations.

She also worked on conservation measures for the endangered Hawaiian monk seal.

In 2010, Bonk was identified as coordinator of the Save Our Seal campaign, which supported stronger penalties for harming Hawaiian monk seals. In comments reported by The Honolulu Advertiser, she supported legislation intended to improve public awareness and protection of the species.

== Community and cultural leadership ==
In December 2003, Bonk became president and executive director of the Japanese Cultural Center of Hawaiʻi in Honolulu.

She assumed leadership after the organization had completed a fundraising effort that helped eliminate substantial debt associated with its facilities. Her responsibilities included strategic planning and the development of programs and organizational operations.

Her employment ended in February 2005 after the center's board of directors cited differences over the organization's future direction.

Bonk has also participated in arts, cultural and community organizations in Hawaiʻi. In a 2014 candidate biography, she identified involvement with the East Hawaiʻi Cultural Center, Holualoa Center for Culture and the Arts, ʻŌlelo Community Television, Kapiʻolani Community College's Art Advisory Board and other civic and cultural initiatives.

== Electoral history ==
Year	Office	Votes	Result
1992	Hawaiʻi County Council	3,141 (54.6%)	Elected
1994	Hawaiʻi County Council	—	Reelected
1996	Hawaiʻi County mayor	16,659 (33.0%)	Second place
2000	Hawaiʻi County mayor	9,998 (19.5%)	Third place
2012	Hawaiʻi House, District 20	3,143	Second place
2014	Hawaiʻi House, District 20	2,047	Second place

The 1992, 1996 and 2000 percentages are as reported by the cited election sources; the 2012 and 2014 figures are vote totals reported by the Hawaiʻi Office of Elections.

== Selected exhibitions ==
Year	Exhibition	Venue
1984	Climbing	Hal Bromm Gallery, New York
1984	Limbo	MoMA PS1, New York
2005	Vintage East Village	Hal Bromm Gallery, New York
2009	Existential Pilgrims	Academy Art Center at Linekona, Honolulu
2015	40: The Anniversary Exhibition	Hal Bromm Gallery, New York
