= Lorraine Inouye =

American politician (born 1940)

Vice President of the Hawaii Senate
- Incumbent
- Assumed office September 1, 2026
- Preceded by: Michelle Kidani

Member of the Hawaii Senate
- Incumbent
- Assumed office November 4, 2014
- Preceded by: Malama Solomon
- Constituency: 4th district (2014–2022); 1st district (2022–present)
- In office November 3, 1998 – November 4, 2008
- Preceded by: Malama Solomon
- Succeeded by: Dwight Takamine
- Constituency: 1st district

Mayor of Hawaii County
- In office December 3, 1990 – December 7, 1992
- Preceded by: Larry Tanimoto (acting)
- Succeeded by: Stephen K. Yamashiro

Personal details
- Born: June 22, 1940 (age 86) Hilo, Hawaii Territory, U.S.
- Party: Democratic
- Spouse: Vernon Inouye
- Children: 3

Lorraine Rodero Inouye (born June 22, 1940) is an American politician from the state of Hawaii. A member of the Democratic Party, she serves in the Hawaii State Senate, representing District 4.

== Political career ==
Inouye was elected to the Hawaii County Council in 1984. In 1990, Inouye ran in a special election to serve the remainder of the term of Bernard Akana, who died in office, as Mayor of Hawaii County. She defeated Stephen K. Yamashiro by 76 votes, becoming the first Filipino-American woman to serve as the mayor of a U.S. County. She ran for re-election in 1992 but lost to Yamashiro.

Inouye ran for the District 1 seat in the Hawaii Senate in 1998, challenging incumbent Democrat Malama Solomon. Inouye defeated Solomon in the primary, and won the general election. She served through 2008. That year, she received a primary challenge from Dwight Takamine, and chose instead to run for Mayor of Hawaii County. Though she initially led her opponents in the opinion polls, she finished third in the Democratic primary, behind eventual winner Billy Kenoi and Angel Pilago.

In 2012, Inouye ran for District 4 in the State Senate. She was defeated in the Democratic primary election by Solomon, the incumbent from District 1. In March 2014, Inouye announced she would challenge Solomon in the upcoming primary election to represent District 4. She defeated Solomon in the primary, and won the general election.

== Personal life ==
Inouye graduated from Hilo High School. Prior to running for political office, Inouye worked as a hotelier. Inouye is married to Vernon Inouye, who grows and exports flowers and serves as co-owner, president, and general manager of Floral Resources Hawaii. She serves as president of Aloha Blooms, the family-owned anthurium farm.

Hawaii Senate
Preceded by Michelle Kidani	Vice President of the Hawaii Senate; 2026–present	Incumbent
