= Ama Naidoo =

South African anti-apartheid activist (1908–1993)

- Born: Manonmoney Ama Pillay; 30 November 1908; Pretoria, South Africa
- Died: 25 December 1993 (aged 85)
- Spouse: Naransamy Roy Naidoo (m. 1934; died 1953)
- Children: 5, including Shanthie and Indres
- Relatives: Thambi Naidoo (father-in-law)

Manonmoney Ama Naidoo OLS (née Pillay; 30 November 1908 – 25 December 1993) or Ama Naidoo was a South African anti-apartheid activist.

== Family and early life ==
Naidoo was of South African Indian descent and was born in Asiatic Bazaar Pretoria. She had her primary school education in the Pretoria primary school. She was the only daughter and had 8 brothers. Her parents had a family business.

She had to care for the family and home and hence she did not pursue an independent career. In 1934 at the age of 26 she married Naransamy Roy Naidoo. He was the son of one of Mahatma Gandhi’s closest friends and a dedicated Satyagrahi, Thambi Naidoo. He sent his children to live and learn under the tutelage of Gandhi at the Tolstoy Farm in Johannesburg.

Roy Naidoo was among the children who went to Tolstoy Farm where he received training in simple living and self-sufficiency. In 1914 after Gandhi finally left South Africa, Roy Naidoo together with the Phoenix boys went to Rabindranath Tagore's Ashram, Shantiniketan where they lived for two years and received some training in arts and crafts as well as Indian culture and language. The party then moved to Sabarmati Ashram.

== Political activism ==
Naidoo's husband Roy returned home to South Africa in 1928. He began work with the trade union movement and joined the Communist Party of South Africa CPSA. Naidoo worked closely with him. She joined him in the 1946 Passive Resistance campaigns and courted imprisonment which she served bravely.

In 1952 she again joined the defiance campaign and was again imprisoned. In 1954 she joined the Federation of South African Women (FEDSAW) and was elected on to its executive committee. She attended the Kliptown People’s Congress and participated in the adoption of the Freedom Charter. In 1956 she marched to the Union buildings with 20,000 women against the pass laws. She participated in almost all the campaigns and marches held in Johannesburg. There were candlelight processions, night vigils, and in 1963 she marched to the Union Buildings in protest against the formation of the South African Indian Council created by the apartheid government. She was outspoken and ready to participate in political activity.

She watched all her children (Shanthie, Indres, Murthie, Ramnie and Prema) being imprisoned, detained, tortured and harassed by the apartheid security police but remained steadfast right to the end. The Naidoo home was always a hive of activity. Leaders such as Moses Kotane, Nelson Mandela, Walter Sisulu and many others were constant visitors. Mandela enjoyed her crab curries.

== Death ==
On 25 December 1993 she died, just under two years prior to South Africa's first multiracial elections held under a universal franchise.

Naidoo was posthumously awarded an Order of Luthuli in Silver in 2006.
