= Shanthie Naidoo =

South African activist (1935–2026)

- Born: 6 March 1935; Pretoria, South Africa
- Died: 23 July 2026 (aged 91)
- Parent(s): Roy Naidoo and Ama Naidoo
- Relatives: Indres Naidoo (brother); Thambi Naidoo (grandfather)

Shantavothie "Shanthie" Naidoo (6 March 1935 – 23 July 2026) was a South African anti-Apartheid activist and an early African National Congress (ANC) member. She was placed in solitary confinement for her political activism along with Winnie Mandela. After leaving South Africa, she continued her political activism on behalf of ANC from the United Kingdom. Naidoo died on 23 July 2026, at the age of 91.
