= Naransamy Roy Naidoo =

South African political activist (1901–1953)

- Born: 1901; Pietermaritzburg, Colony of Natal, South Africa
- Died: 1953 (aged 51–52)
- Spouse: Ama Naidoo
- Children: 5, including Shanti and Indres
- Father: Thambi Naidoo

Thambi Naransamy Naidoo or Roy Naidoo (1901–1953) was a South African political activist. He was of South African Indian Telugu descent. He is the son of an early collaborator of Mahatma Gandhi, Thambi Naidoo. He was married to another activist Ama Naidoo.

== Biography ==
He was born in 1901 in Pietermaritzburg, Colony of Natal. He was adopted by the family of Mahatma Gandhi and went to India for his education, where he studied under the poet Rabindranath Tagore. He became a trade unionist and leader of bakery workers on the Rand.

In 1946 he helped organise the campaign by Indians against the Asiatic Land Tenure and Indian Representation Act; he served two terms of imprisonment for passive resistance. He was active again in the 1952 Defiance Campaign and also served as vice-president of the Transvaal Indian Congress and chairman of the Transvaal Peace Council. He died in 1953. He was the father of Shanti Naidoo and Indres Naidoo, both active opponents of the South African regime.
