= Thambi Naidoo =

South African civil rights activist

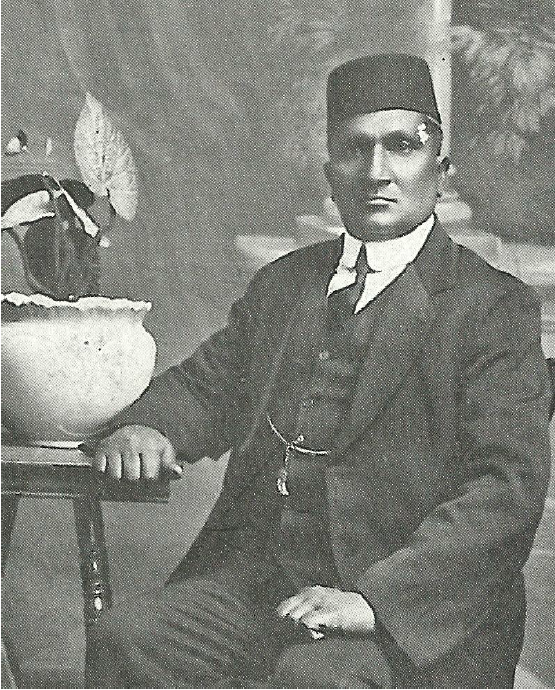
- Born: 1875; Mauritius
- Died: 1933 (aged 57–58)
- Children: 7 (including Roy Naidoo)
- Relatives: Indres Naidoo (grandson); Shanti Naidoo (granddaughter); Ama Naidoo (daughter-in-law)

Govindasamy Krishnasamy Thambi Naidoo (1875 – 1933) was a South African civil rights activist. He was an early collaborator of Mahatma Gandhi leading many protests in then South Africa against racial discrimination targeted at the Indian community.

He was a member and later a chairperson of the Tamil Benefit Society. Four generations of the Naidoo family starting with him devoted themselves to civil rights activism, including anti-apartheid protests, and were known as Congress Naidoos.

== Early life ==
Naidoo was born in Mauritius in 1875. He was the youngest son of a migrant family from Mattur (in present- day Thanjavur district), in the former Madras Presidency of British India. His father was a fertilizer contractor. Naidoo migrated to Kimberley (then part of the Cape Colony), along with his brother and sister, when he was 14, in 1889. He moved to Johannesburg in 1892 where he became an agricultural produce wholesaler.

== Activism ==
=== Early years (1889 – 1905) ===
Naidoo's first foray into activism was in protest of the Law 3 of 1885, which imposed segregation on Indians in the Transvaal province, restricting their movements. He led a protest march to the Johannesburg Municipal Council, and was a part of the delegation to meet president Paul Kruger with a petition against the law.

Naidoo was one of the founding members of the Transvaal Indian Congress (TIC) in 1893, with H. O. Ally. The establishment was a precursor to the Natal Indian Congress which Gandhi founded in 1894.

=== Collaboration with Gandhi (1906 – 1913) ===
From 1906 to 1913, he collaborated with Gandhi in the South African Indian communities as they struggled against pre-Apartheid racial repression by the local white and the colonial British authorities in Durban. Naidoo was an executive member of the Transvaal British Indian Association of which Gandhi was the secretary. He was known as one Gandhi's top lieutenants in the country. Naidoo collaborated with Gandhi, as the latter firmed up his political actions against Jan Smuts, the then South African prime minister. In 1907, he participated in the picketing at the registration offices, and was among the first to be arrested. Later that year, he boycotted the mandatory registration and was forced outside of Transvaal, and was arrested in January 1908 along with Gandhi. Thambi was also by Gandhi's side when Gandhi organized his Satyagraha movement in Transvaal, and later during the strike of 1913 in protest against the £3 tax on indentured laborers.

He was elected the chairperson of the Johannesburg-based Tamil Benefit Society in 2012.

=== After Gandhi's return to India (1914 – 1933) ===
Naidoo continued to lead the Indian community in South Africa after Gandhi's return to India in 1914. He was elected as the president of the TIC in 1932. He led protests against some of the discriminatory legislations of the period including the Transvaal Asiatic Land Tenure Act and the Licences (Control) Ordinance. He voiced his dissent against the South African Indian Congress deciding to participate in the Colonisation Enquiry Committee, an initiative that the ruling government had set up to find ways for the Indian community to emigrate from South Africa into countries like Borneo.

In 1933, he led the movement to remove untouchability at the Melrose Hindu Temple.

== Personal life ==
Naidoo was married to Veeramal (née Pillay), the sister of a close friend. The couple had seven children including Roy Naidoo. His wife and children all led various passive resistance movements protesting discrimination against the Indian community. His children grew up in the Tolstoy Farm, which Gandhi had opened for families of civil activists. Four of his sons including Roy were sent to India along with Gandhi, and studied under poet, Nobel laureate, and Indian independence activist Rabindranath Tagore. They continued to remain associated with anti-apartheid movements from within South Africa and outside in exile. The family, four generations starting with Naidoo, were known as Congress Naidoos. Naidoo had no formal education but spoke English, Tamil, Telugu, Hindustani, Creole, and Zulu.

Naidoo died on October 31, 1933, in Johannesburg.

An exhibition detailing Naidoo's family's activism titled Resistance in their Blood:The Naidoo-Pillay Family: Pacifists, Protestors, Prisoners, Patriots, was part of the Apartheid Museum in Johannesburg.

== Book(s) ==
- Vadi, Ismail (2021). Thambi Naidoo and Family: Struggle for a Non-racial Democracy in South Africa. Ahmed Kathrada Foundation. ISBN 978-0-620-92411-5.
- Annamalai, A (2023). Gandhiyin Thalapathi, Thambi Naidoo [Gandhi's Lieutenant, Thambi Naidoo] (in Tamil). National Gandhi Museum.
