= Cottonwood, Utah =

Cottonwood, Utah, has historically referred to a vaguely defined area between and around Big Cottonwood Creek and Little Cottonwood Creek in the Salt Lake Valley:

- Holladay, Utah, a city that was called Holladay-Cottonwood at the time of its incorporation as a temporary compromise between the names Holladay and Cottonwood
- Cottonwood Mall (Utah), the repeatedly delayed redevelopment of which has sometimes been promoted as intending to create a definitive center for Cottonwood
- Cottonwood Heights, Utah, a city that includes the southeastern part of the area to which the name applies and the only incorporated place named for Cottonwood
- Cottonwood West, Utah, a former census-designated place within Cottonwood that ceased to exist due to annexation by Murray
- Murray, Utah, a city that includes the western part of the area to which the name applies

== See also ==
- Cottonwood Canyon (Utah) in Southern Utah
