= Asian Americans in politics =

Asian Americans represent a growing share of the national population and of the electorate. The lower political participation of Asian Americans has been raised as a concern, especially as it relates to their influence on politics in the United States. Asian Americans were once a strong constituency for Republicans. In 1992, George H.W. Bush won 55% of Asian voters. In the 21st century, Asian Americans have become a key Democratic Party constituency. As of 2023, 62% of Asian American registered voters identify with or lean towards the Democratic Party, in contrast to 34% who identify with or lean towards the Republicans.

== Officeholders ==
=== Elected national officials ===
==== Vice president ====
Name	Image	Term	Ethnicity	State	Party	Offices held
Kamala Harris (1964–)		2021–2025	Indian American	California	Democratic	Harris, who is half Indian American, became the US' first female vice president, the highest-ranking female elected official in U.S. history, and the first African-American and first Asian American vice president.

=== Congress ===
==== Senate ====
(Note: Senators are organized first in chronological order according to their first term in office, then second in alphabetical order according to their surname.)

Senator		Asian and/or Pacific Islander ethnicity	Party	State	Tenure			Notes
Senator		Asian and/or Pacific Islander ethnicity	Party	State	Term start	Term end	Length of service	Notes
Sen. Fong	Hiram Fong (1906–2004)	Chinese (Note: First American of Chinese ancestry elected to Congress)	Republican	Hawaii	August 21, 1959	January 3, 1977	17 years, 135 days	Retired
Sen. Inouye	Daniel Inouye (1924–2012)	Japanese (Note: First Japanese American elected to the Senate)	Democratic	Hawaii	January 3, 1963	December 17, 2012	49 years, 349 days	Died in office
Sen. Hayakawa	S. I. Hayakawa (1906–1992)	Japanese	Republican	California	January 2, 1977	January 3, 1983	6 years, 1 day	Retired
Sen. Matsunaga	Spark Matsunaga (1916–1990)	Japanese	Democratic	Hawaii	January 3, 1977	April 15, 1990	13 years, 102 days	Died in office
Sen. Akaka	Daniel Akaka (1924–2018)	Hawaiian, Chinese (Note: First Native Hawaiian to serve in the Senate)	Democratic	Hawaii	May 16, 1990	January 3, 2013	22 years, 232 days	Initially appointed; later re-elected Retired
Sen. Ensign	John Ensign (born 1958)	Filipino (Note: First person of Filipino ancestry elected to the Senate)	Republican	Nevada	January 3, 2001	May 3, 2011	10 years, 120 days	Resigned
Sen. Hirono	Mazie Hirono (born 1947)	Japanese (Note: First Asian American woman elected to the Senate)	Democratic	Hawaii	January 3, 2013	Incumbent	13 years, 322 days	
Sen. Duckworth	Tammy Duckworth (born 1968)	Thai, Chinese (Note: First Thai American elected to the Senate)	Democratic	Illinois	January 3, 2017	Incumbent	9 years, 322 days	
Sen. Harris	Kamala Harris (born 1964)	Indian (Note: First person of South Asian ancestry elected to the Senate; together with Pramila Jayapal, first Indian American woman elected to Congress)	Democratic	California	January 3, 2017	January 18, 2021	4 years, 15 days	Resigned to become Vice President
	Andy Kim (born 1982)	Korean (Note: First Korean American elected to the Senate)	Democratic	New Jersey	December 8, 2024	Incumbent	1 year, 348 days	

==== House of Representatives ====
(Note: Representatives are organized first in chronological order according to their first term in office, then second in alphabetical order according to their surname.)

Representative		Asian and/or Pacific Islander ethnicity	Party	State	Tenure			Notes
Representative		Asian and/or Pacific Islander ethnicity	Party	State	Term start	Term end	Length of service	Notes
Rep. Saund	Dalip Singh Saund (1899–1973)	Indian (Note: First AAPI person elected to Congress as a non-delegate, and also first Indian American elected to Congress)	Democratic	California	January 3, 1957	January 3, 1963	6 years, 0 days	Lost reelection
Rep. Inouye	Daniel Inouye (1924–2012)	Japanese (Note: First Japanese American elected to Congress)	Democratic	Hawaii	August 21, 1959	January 3, 1963	3 years, 135 days	Retired to run successfully for U.S. Senate
Rep. Matsunaga	Spark Matsunaga (1916–1990)	Japanese	Democratic	Hawaii	January 3, 1963	January 3, 1977	14 years, 0 days	Retired to run successfully for U.S. Senate
Rep. Mink	Patsy Mink (1927–2002)	Japanese (Note: First Asian American woman elected to Congress)	Democratic	Hawaii	January 3, 1965	January 3, 1977	12 years, 0 days	Retired to run unsuccessfully for U.S. Senate
Rep. Mink	Patsy Mink (1927–2002)	Japanese	Democratic	Hawaii	September 22, 1990	September 28, 2002	12 years, 6 days	Died in office
Rep. Mineta	Norman Mineta (1931–2022)	Japanese	Democratic	California	January 3, 1975	October 10, 1995	20 years, 280 days	Resigned; Later served as Secretary of Commerce and Secretary of Transportation
Rep. Akaka	Daniel Akaka (1924–2018)	Chinese	Democratic	Hawaii	January 3, 1977	May 16, 1990	13 years, 133 days	Resigned after being appointed to the U.S. Senate
Rep. Matsui	Bob Matsui (1941–2005)	Japanese	Democratic	California	January 3, 1979	January 1, 2005	25 years, 364 days	Died in office
Rep. Dymally	Mervyn Dymally (1926–2012)	Indian (Note: First (and so far only) Dougla elected to Congress)	Democratic	California	January 3, 1981	January 3, 1993	12 years, 0 days	Retired
Rep. Saiki	Pat Saiki (1930–2026)	Japanese	Republican	Hawaii	January 3, 1987	January 3, 1991	4 years, 0 days	Retired to run unsuccessfully for U.S. Senate
Rep. Kim	Jay Kim (born 1939)	Korean (Note: First Korean American elected to Congress)	Republican	California	January 3, 1993	January 3, 1999	6 years, 0 days	Lost renomination
Rep. Scott	Bobby Scott (born 1947)	Filipino (Note: First American-born Filipino elected to Congress)	Democratic	Virginia	January 3, 1993	Incumbent	33 years, 322 days	
Rep. Ensign	John Ensign (born 1958)	Filipino	Republican	Nevada	January 3, 1995	January 3, 1999	4 years, 0 days	Retired to run unsuccessfully for U.S. Senate; Later elected to the U.S. Senate from Nevada
Rep. Wu	David Wu (born 1955)	Taiwanese (Note: First Taiwanese American elected to Congress)	Democratic	Oregon	January 3, 1999	August 3, 2011	12 years, 212 days	Resigned
Rep. Honda	Mike Honda (born 1941)	Japanese	Democratic	California	January 3, 2001	January 3, 2017	16 years, 0 days	Lost reelection
Rep. Jindal	Bobby Jindal (born 1971)	Indian	Republican	Louisiana	January 3, 2005	January 14, 2008	3 years, 11 days	Resigned to run successfully for Governor
Rep. Matsui	Doris Matsui (born 1944)	Japanese	Democratic	California	March 8, 2005	Incumbent	21 years, 258 days	Elected to succeed late husband
Rep. Hirono	Mazie Hirono (born 1947)	Japanese	Democratic	Hawaii	January 3, 2007	January 3, 2013	6 years, 0 days	Retired to run successfully for U.S. Senate
Rep. Austria	Steve Austria (born 1958)	Filipino	Republican	Ohio	January 3, 2009	January 3, 2013	4 years, 0 days	Retired following decennial redistricting
Rep. Cao	Joseph Cao (born 1967)	Vietnamese (Note: First Vietnamese American elected to Congress)	Republican	Louisiana	January 3, 2009	January 3, 2011	2 years, 0 days	Lost reelection
Rep. Chu	Judy Chu (born 1953)	Chinese (Note: First Chinese American woman elected to Congress)	Democratic	California	July 14, 2009	Incumbent	17 years, 130 days	
Rep. Djou	Charles Djou (born 1970)	Thai, Chinese (Note: First Thai American elected to Congress)	Republican	Hawaii	May 22, 2010	January 3, 2011	226 days	Lost reelection
Rep. Clarke	Hansen Clarke (born 1957)	Bangladeshi (Note: First person of Bangladeshi ancestry elected to Congress)	Democratic	Michigan	January 3, 2011	January 3, 2013	2 years, 0 days	Lost renomination following decennial redistricting
Rep. Hanabusa	Colleen Hanabusa (1951–2026)	Japanese	Democratic	Hawaii	January 3, 2011	January 3, 2015	4 years, 0 days	Retired to run unsuccessfully for U.S. Senate
Rep. Hanabusa	Colleen Hanabusa (1951–2026)	Japanese	Democratic	Hawaii	November 14, 2016	January 3, 2019	2 years, 50 days	Retired to run unsuccessfully for Governor
Rep. Bera	Ami Bera (born 1965)	Indian	Democratic	California	January 3, 2013	Incumbent	13 years, 322 days	
Rep. Duckworth	Tammy Duckworth (born 1968)	Thai, Chinese (Note: First Thai American woman elected to Congress)	Democratic	Illinois	January 3, 2013	January 3, 2017	4 years, 0 days	Retired to run successfully for U.S. Senate
Rep. Meng	Grace Meng (born 1975)	Taiwanese (Note: First Taiwanese American woman elected to Congress)	Democratic	New York	January 3, 2013	Incumbent	13 years, 322 days	
Rep. Takano	Mark Takano (born 1960)	Japanese (Note: First openly gay person of AAPI ancestry elected to Congress)	Democratic	California	January 3, 2013	Incumbent	13 years, 322 days	
Rep. Lieu	Ted Lieu (born 1969)	Taiwanese	Democratic	California	January 3, 2015	Incumbent	11 years, 322 days	
Rep. Takai	Mark Takai (1967–2016)	Japanese	Democratic	Hawaii	January 3, 2015	July 20, 2016	1 year, 199 days	Died in office
Rep. Jayapal	Pramila Jayapal (born 1965)	Indian (Note: Together with Kamala Harris, first Indian American woman elected to Congress)	Democratic	Washington	January 3, 2017	Incumbent	9 years, 322 days	
Rep. Khanna	Ro Khanna (born 1976)	Indian	Democratic	California	January 3, 2017	Incumbent	9 years, 322 days	
Rep. Krishnamoorthi	Raja Krishnamoorthi (born 1973)	Indian	Democratic	Illinois	January 3, 2017	Incumbent	9 years, 322 days	
Rep. Murphy	Stephanie Murphy (born 1978)	Vietnamese (Note: First Vietnamese American woman elected to Congress)	Democratic	Florida	January 3, 2017	January 3, 2023	6 years, 0 days	Retired
	TJ Cox (born 1963)	Filipino, Chinese	Democratic	California	January 3, 2019	January 3, 2021	2 years, 0 days	Lost reelection
	Andy Kim (born 1982)	Korean	Democratic	New Jersey	January 3, 2019	December 8, 2024	5 years, 340 days	Retired to run successfully for U.S. Senate
	Young Kim (born 1962)	Korean (Note: Reps. Kim, Steel and Strickland are collectively the first Korean American women elected to Congress)	Republican	California	January 3, 2021	Incumbent	5 years, 322 days	
	Michelle Steel (born 1955)	Korean	Republican	California	January 3, 2021	January 3, 2025	4 years, 0 days	Lost reelection
	Marilyn Strickland (born 1962)	Korean	Democratic	Washington	January 3, 2021	Incumbent	5 years, 322 days	
	Shri Thanedar (born 1955)	Indian	Democratic	Michigan	January 3, 2023	Incumbent	3 years, 322 days	
	Jill Tokuda (born 1976)	Japanese	Democratic	Hawaii	January 3, 2023	Incumbent	3 years, 322 days	
	Vince Fong (born 1979)	Chinese	Republican	California	June 3, 2024	Incumbent	2 years, 171 days	
	Dave Min (born 1976)	Korean	Democratic	California	January 3, 2025	Incumbent	1 year, 322 days	
	Suhas Subramanyam (born 1986)	Indian	Democratic	Virginia	January 3, 2025	Incumbent	1 year, 322 days	
	Derek Tran (born 1980)	Vietnamese	Democratic	California	January 3, 2025	Incumbent	1 year, 322 days	

=== State and local government ===
==== Governors ====
Name	Image	Term	Ethnicity	State	Party	Offices held
George Ariyoshi (1926–2026)		1974–1986	Japanese American	Hawaii	Democratic	First American of Asian descent to be elected governor of a state of the United States. He continues to hold the record as the longest-serving state governor in Hawaii.
Ben Cayetano (1939–)		1994–2002	Filipino American	Hawaii	Democratic	First Filipino American to serve as a state governor in the United States.
Gary Locke (1950–)		1997–2005	Chinese American	Washington	Democratic	First Chinese American to be elected governor in United States history and the first Asian American governor in the continental United States.
Bobby Jindal (1971–)		2008–2016	Indian American	Louisiana	Republican	Served in various executive positions in Louisiana and the U.S. Department of Health and Human Services before being elected to Congress in 2004, and finally winning the Louisiana gubernatorial elections in 2007 (thereby becoming the first non-white governor of Louisiana since Reconstruction), the first elected Indian American governor in U.S. history, as well as the second Asian American governor to serve in the continental United States.
Nikki Haley (1972–)		2011–2017	Indian American	South Carolina	Republican	Served as the 116th Governor of South Carolina from 2011 to 2017. Haley previously represented Lexington County in the South Carolina House of Representatives from 2005 to 2010. She is the first Sikh American governor in the United States, first female governor of South Carolina, second elected Indian American governor in U.S. history, as well as the third Asian American governor to serve in the continental United States. Nikki Haley's election was not the only first for Asian Americans to occur during the 2010 election cycle.
David Ige (1957–)		2014–2022	Japanese American	Hawaii	Democratic	Served as the 8th governor of Hawaii from 2014 to 2022. First person of Okinawan descent to hold office in the U.S.

==== Statewide offices ====
Name	Image	Term	Ethnicity	State	Party	Offices held
James Kealoha (1908–1983)		1959–1962	Chinese American	Hawaii	Republican	Lieutenant Governor of Hawaii
Andrew T. F. Ing (1919–1999)		1966	Chinese American	Hawaii	Democratic	Lieutenant Governor of Hawaii
Nelson Doi (1922–2015)		1974–1978	Japanese American	Hawaii	Democratic	Lieutenant Governor of Hawaii
March Fong Eu (1922–2017)		1975–1994	Chinese American	California	Democratic	Secretary of State of California
Jean Sadako King (1925–2013)		1978–1982	Japanese American	Hawaii	Democratic	Lieutenant Governor of Hawaii
S. B. Woo (1937–)		1985–1989	Chinese American	Delaware	Democratic	Lieutenant Governor of Delaware
Mazie Hirono (1947–)		1994–2002	Japanese American	Hawaii	Democratic	Lieutenant Governor of Hawaii
Matt Fong (1953–2011)		1995–1999	Chinese American	California	Republican	California State Treasurer
Cheryl Lau (1944–)		1995–1999	Chinese American	Nevada	Republican	Nevada Secretary of State
Duke Aiona (1955–)		2002–2010	Chinese American	Hawaii	Republican	Served as Lieutenant Governor from 2002 to 2010.
Alex Sink (1948–)		2007–2011	Thai American	Florida	Democratic	Served as Chief Financial Officer of Florida from 2007 to 2011.
Kamala Harris (1964–)		2011–2017	Indian American	California	Democratic	Harris, who is half Indian American, became the first female, first Jamaican American, and first Asian American state attorney general in the United States.
Shan Tsutsui (1971–)		2012–2018	Japanese American	Hawaii	Democratic	Lieutenant Governor of Hawaii
Sean Reyes (1971–)		2013–2025	Filipino American; Japanese American	Utah	Republican	Attorney General of Utah
John Chiang (1962–)		2015–2019	Taiwanese American	California	Democratic	Served as California State Treasurer from 2015 to 2019.
Doug Chin (1966–)		2015–2018	Chinese American	Hawaii	Democratic	Served as Lieutenant Governor of Hawaii in 2018 and as Hawaii Attorney General from 2015 to 2018.
Betty Yee (1957–)		2015–present	Chinese American	California	Democratic	Served as California State Controller from 2015 to 2023.
Fiona Ma (1966–)		2019–present	Chinese American	California	Democratic	California State Treasurer from 2019–present.
William Tong (1973–)		2019–present	Chinese American	Connecticut	Democratic	Serving as Connecticut Attorney General since 2019.
Kimberly Yee (1974–)		2019–present	Chinese American	Arizona	Republican	Serving as Arizona State Treasurer since 2019.
Rob Bonta (1972–)		2021–present	Filipino American	California	Democratic	Attorney General of California since 2021.
Steve Hobbs (1970–)		2021–present	Japanese American	Washington	Democratic	Secretary of State of Washington since 2021.
Sylvia Luke (1967–)		2022–present	Korean American	Hawaii	Democratic	Lieutenant Governor of Hawaii since 2022. First Korean American politician elected to a statewide office.
Vivek Malek (1977–)		2022–present	Indian American	Missouri	Republican	State Treasurer of Missouri since 2022.
Susan C. Lee (1954–)		2023–present	Chinese American	Maryland	Democratic	Secretary of State of Maryland
Aruna Miller (1964–)		2023–present	Indian American	Maryland	Democratic	Lieutenant Governor of Maryland since 2023. First South Asian lieutenant governor in the United States.
Portia Wu (1970–)		2023–present	Taiwanese American	Maryland		Secretary of Labor of Maryland
Ghazala Hashmi (1964–)		2026–present	Indian American	Virginia	Democratic	Lieutenant Governor of Virginia since 2026.

==== State Legislative offices ====
(Note: Legislators are organized first in chronological order according to their first term in office, then second in alphabetical order according to their surname.)

Name	Image	Term	Ethnicity	State	Party	Offices held
Kazuhisa Abe (1914–1996)		1959–1966	Japanese American	Hawaii	Democratic	Served in the Hawaii State Senate, including as Senate President in 1965–1966 (after Nelson Doi).
Tadao Beppu (1919–1993)		1959–1976	Japanese American	Hawaii	Democratic	Served in the Hawaii House of Representatives, including as Speaker of the House from 1968 to 1974. Also served as secretary of the Hawaii Constitutional Convention of 1968.
Robert Fukuda (1922–2013)		1959–1962	Japanese American	Hawaii	Republican	Served in the Hawaii House of Representatives. Later served as U.S. Attorney in Hawaii from 1969 to 1973.
Noboru Miyake (1896–1988)		1959–1966	Japanese American	Hawaii	Republican	Served in the Hawaii State Senate.
Steere Noda (1892–1986)		1959–1962	Japanese American	Hawaii	Democratic	Served in the Hawaii State Senate.
Sakae Takahashi (1919–2001)		1959–1974	Japanese American	Hawaii	Democratic	Served in the Hawaii State Senate.
Yoshito Takamine (1924–2015)		1959–1984	Japanese American	Hawaii	Democratic	Served in the Hawaii House of Representatives.
John T. Ushijima (1924–2006)		1959–1982	Japanese American	Hawaii	Democratic	Served in the Hawaii State Senate.
James H. Wakatsuki (1929–1992)		1959–1980	Japanese American	Hawaii	Democratic	Served in the Hawaii House of Representatives, including as Speaker of the House from 1975 to 1980. Later served as a Hawaii Supreme Court justice.
Nadao Yoshinaga (1919–2009)		1959–1974	Japanese American	Hawaii	Democratic	Served in the Hawaii State Senate.
Edmond Gong (1930–2015)		1963–1966, 1966–1972	Chinese American	Florida	Democratic	Served in the Florida House of Representatives from 1963 to 1966 and Florida State Senate from 1966 to 1972. First Asian American legislator in Florida.
Alfred H. Song (1919–2004)		1963–1967, 1967–1978	Korean American	California	Democratic	Served in the California State Assembly from 1963 to 1967 and California State Senate from 1967 to 1978.
Peter Aduja (1920–2007)		1966–1974	Filipino American	Hawaii	Republican	Served in the Hawaii House of Representatives. Elected to Territorial House of Representatives, serving from 1954-1956. First Filipino American elected to public office in the United States.
March Fong Eu (1922–2017)		1967–1974	Chinese American	California	Democratic	Served in the California State Assembly.
Tom Hom (1927–)		1968–1970	Chinese American	California	Republican	Served in the California State Assembly.
Paul Bannai (1920–2019)		1973–1980	Japanese American	California	Republican	Served in the California State Assembly.
John Eng (1942–)		1973–1983	Hong Kong American	Washington	Democratic	First Asian American legislator in Washington state.
Joseph Rhodes Jr. (1947–2013)		1973–1980	Chinese American Filipino American	Pennsylvania	Democratic	Served in the Pennsylvania House of Representatives from 1973 to 1980. Served in the President's Commission on Campus Unrest in 1970.
Thelma Buchholdt (1934–2007)		1975–1983	Filipino American	Alaska	Democratic	Served in the Alaska House of Representatives. First Filipino American woman legislator in the United States.
S. Floyd Mori (1939–)		1975–1980	Japanese American	California	Democratic	Served in the California State Assembly.
Jerry Chang		1988–2012	Chinese American	Hawaii	Democratic	Served in the Hawaii House of Representatives.
David Valderrama (1933–)		1991–2003	Filipino American	Maryland	Democratic	Served in the Maryland House of Delegates from 1991 to 2003. First Filipino American elected to a state legislature in the contiguous United States.
Nao Takasugi (1922–2009)		1992–1998	Japanese American	California	Republican	Served in the California State Assembly.
Joe Tanaka (1941–)		1992–2000	Japanese American	Hawaii	Democratic	Served in the Hawaii State Senate from 1992 to 2000.
John Lim (1935–)		1993–2001, 2005–2009	Korean American	Oregon	Republican	Served in the Oregon State Senate from 1993 to 2001. Served in the Oregon House of Representatives from 2005 to 2009. While in the Oregon State Senate, he served as Majority Leader.
Paull Shin (1935–2021)		1993–1995, 1999–2014	Korean American	Washington	Democratic	Served in the Washington House of Representatives from 1993 to 1995 and the Washington State Senate from 1999 to 2014.
Nimi McConigley (1939–)		1994–1996	Indian American	Wyoming	Republican	Served in the Wyoming House of Representatives from 1994 to 1996. First Indian born person to be elected to any state legislature.
Stan Matsunaka (1953–)		1995–2003	Japanese American	Colorado	Democratic	Served in the Colorado Senate from 1995 to 2003 and as President of the Colorado Senate from 2001 to 2002.
Mike Honda (1941–)		1996–2000	Japanese American	California	Democratic	Served in the California State Assembly.
Kevin J. O'Toole (1964–)		1996–2001, 2001–2002, 2002–2008, 2008–2017	Korean American	New Jersey	Republican	Served in the New Jersey General Assembly, 1996–2001 and 2002–2008. Served in the New Jersey Senate, 2001–2002 and 2008–2017. First Asian American legislator in New Jersey.
John Pippy (1970–)		1997–2003, 2003–2012	Thai American	Pennsylvania	Republican	Served in the Pennsylvania House of Representatives from 1997 to 2003 before being elected to the Pennsylvania State Senate.
George Nakano (1935–)		1998–2004	Japanese American	California	Democratic	Served in the California State Assembly.
Steve Austria (1958–)		1999–2000, 2001–2008	Filipino American	Ohio	Republican	Served in the Ohio House of Representatives (1999–2000) and the Ohio Senate (2001–2008).
Sharon Tomiko Santos (1961–)		1999–present	Japanese American	Washington	Democratic	Serving in the Washington House of Representatives since 1999.
Jeff Coleman (1975–)		2001–2004	Filipino American	Pennsylvania	Republican	Served in the Pennsylvania House of Representatives from 2001 to 2004.
Blake Oshiro (1970–)		2001–2011	Okinawan American	Hawaii	Democratic	Served in the Hawaii House of Representatives from 2001 to 2011. Oshiro was majority leader during his tenure.
Saghir Tahir (1945–2013)		2001–2011	Pakistani American	New Hampshire	Republican	Served in the New Hampshire House of Representatives from 2001 to 2011. First Pakistan native to be elected to any state legislature, and first Muslim American elected to any political office in the United States.
Corinne Ching		2002–2012	Chinese American	Hawaii	Republican	Served in the Hawaii House of Representatives.
Shirley Horton (1952–)		2002–2008	Japanese American	California	Republican	Served in the California State Assembly.
Upendra J. Chivukula (1950–)		2002–2014	Indian American	New Jersey	Democratic	Served in the New Jersey General Assembly from 2002 to 2014. First Indian American to be elected to the New Jersey legislature.
Rida Cabanilla (1952–)		2004–2014, 2018–2020	Filipino American	Hawaii	Democratic	Served in the Hawaii House of Representatives from 2004 to 2014 and 2018 to 2020.
Nikki Haley (1972–)		2005–2011	Indian American	South Carolina	Republican	Served in the South Carolina House of Representatives from 2005 to 2011. First Indian American to be elected to the South Carolina legislature. She would later be elected governor.
Bob Hasegawa (1952–)		2005–2013, 2013–present	Japanese American	Washington	Democratic	Served in the Washington House of Representatives from 2005 to 2013 and the Washington State Senate since 2013.
Ted Lieu (1969–)		2005–2010, 2011–2014	Taiwanese American	California	Democratic	Served in the California State Assembly from 2005 to 2010 and the California State Senate from 2011 to 2014.
Jimmy Meng (1944–)		2005–2006	Chinese American Taiwanese American	New York	Democratic	Served in the New York State Assembly from 2005 to 2006. First Asian American state legislator in New York.
Hubert Vo (1956–)		2005–present	Vietnamese American	Texas	Democratic	Serving in the Texas House of Representatives since 2005. First Vietnamese American to be elected to the Texas Legislature.
Saqib Ali (1971–)		2007–2011	Pakistani American; Indian American	Maryland	Democratic	Served in the Maryland House of Delegates
Tony Fulton (1972–)		2007–2013	Filipino American	Nebraska	Republican	Served in the Nebraska Legislature from 2007 to 2013. Served as the tax commissioner of Nebraska from 2016 to 2022.
Jay Goyal (1980–)		2007–2013	Indian American	Ohio	Democratic	Served in the Ohio House of Representatives from 2007 to 2013.
Sharon Har		2007–2022	Korean American	Hawaii	Democratic	Served in the Hawaii House of Representatives.
Scott Kawasaki (1975–)		2007–2019, 2019–present	Japanese American	Alaska	Democratic	Served in the Alaska House of Representatives from 2007 to 2019 before being elected to the Alaska State Senate in 2019.
William Tong (1973–)		2007–2019	Chinese American	Connecticut	Democratic	Served in the Connecticut House of Representatives. Elected as Connecticut Attorney General in 2018.
Kris Valderrama (1970–)		2007–present	Filipino American	Maryland	Democratic	Served in the Maryland House of Delegates
Ellen Young		2007–2008	Taiwanese American	New York	Democratic	Served in the New York State Assembly from 2007 to 2008.
Paul Fong (1952–)		2008–2014	Chinese American	California	Democratic	Served in the California State Assembly from 2008 to 2014.
Sonia Chang-Díaz (1978–)		2009–2023	Chinese American	Massachusetts	Democratic	Served in the Massachusetts Senate from 2009 to 2023.
Angie Chen Button (1954–)		2009–present	Chinese American	Texas	Republican	Serving in the Texas House of Representatives since 2009.
Tony Hwang (1964–)		2009–2015, 2015–present	Taiwanese American	Connecticut	Republican	Served in the Connecticut House of Representatives from 2009 to 2015 before being elected to the Connecticut State Senate where he currently serves.
Grace Meng (1975–)		2009–2012	Taiwanese American	New York	Democratic	Served in the New York State Assembly from 2009 to 2012.
Kesha Ram Hinsdale (1986–)		2009–2016, 2021–present	Indian American	Vermont	Democratic	Served in the Vermont House of Representatives from 2009 to 2016. Serving in the Vermont Senate since 2021 and as Majority Leader since 2025.
Mark Keam (1966–)		2010–2022	Korean American	Virginia	Democratic	Served in the Virginia House of Delegates
Aruna Miller (1964–)		2010–2019	Indian American	Maryland	Democratic	Served in the Maryland House of Delegates. First Indian American to be elected to the Maryland General Assembly. She would later be elected lieutenant governor.
Tackey Chan (1973–)		2011–present	Chinese American	Massachusetts	Democratic	Serving in the Massachusetts House of Representatives since 2011.
Keiko Orrall		2011–2019	Japanese American	Massachusetts	Republican	Served in the Massachusetts House of Representatives from 2011 to 2019.
B. J. Pak (1980–)		2011–2017	Korean American	Georgia	Republican	Served in the Georgia House of Representatives from 2011 to 2017. In 2017 he was nominated and confirmed as United States Attorney for the Northern District of Georgia
Janak Joshi (unknown)		2011–2013, 2013–2017	Indian American	Colorado	Republican	Served in the Colorado House of Representatives from 2011 to 2013 and 2013 to 2017.
Cliff Rosenberger (1981–)		2011–2018	Korean American	Ohio	Republican	Served in the Ohio House of Representatives, including as speaker from 2015 to 2018.
Cindy Ryu (1957–)		2011–present	Korean American	Washington	Democratic	Serving in the Washington House of Representatives since 2011.
Prasad Srinivasan (1949–)		2011–2019	Indian American	Connecticut	Republican	Served in the Connecticut House of Representatives from 2011 to 2019.
Donald Wong (1952–)		2011–present	Chinese American	Massachusetts	Republican	Serving in the Massachusetts House of Representatives since 2011.
Ed Chau (1957–)		2012–2021	Hong Kong American	California	Democratic	Served in the California State Assembly from 2012 to 2021.
Sara Gideon (1971–)		2012–2020	Indian American	Maine	Democratic	Served in the Maine House of Representatives, including as speaker from 2016 to 2020.
Aboul Khan (1960–)		2012–2014, 2016–present	Bangladeshi American	New Hampshire	Republican	Served in the New Hampshire House of Representatives from 2012 to 2014 and since 2016.
Al Muratsuchi (1964–)		2012–2014, 2016–present	Japanese American	California	Democratic	Served in the California State Assembly from 2012 to 2014 and since 2016.
Phil Ting (1969–)		2012–present	Chinese American	California	Democratic	Serving in the California State Assembly since 2012.
Das Williams (1974–)		2012–2016	Indonesian American	California	Democratic	Served in the California State Assembly from 2012 to 2016.
Mia Gregerson (1972–)		2013–present	Taiwanese American	Washington	Democratic	Serving in the Washington House of Representatives since 2013.
Patty Kim (1973–)		2013–2025, 2025–present	Korean American	Pennsylvania	Democratic	Served in the Pennsylvania House of Representatives from 2013 to 2025 and the Pennsylvania State Senate since 2025.
Ron Kim (1979–)		2013–present	Korean American	New York	Democratic	Serving in the New York State Assembly since 2013.
Brian Shiozawa		2013–2017	Japanese American	Utah	Republican	Served in the Utah State Senate
Gene Wu (1978–)		2013–present	Chinese American	Texas	Democratic	Serving in the Texas House of Representatives since 2013.
Niraj Antani (1991–)		2014–2020, 2021–2024	Indian American	Ohio	Republican	Served in the Ohio House of Representatives from 2014 to 2020 and in the Ohio Senate from 2021 to 2024.
Ling Ling Chang (1976–)		2014–2016, 2018–2020	Taiwanese American	California	Republican	From 2014 to 2016 Chang served in the California State Assembly. In 2016 she ran for a seat in the California State Senate and lost, but the incumbent was recalled, and she won the special election for the remainder of his term.
Kansen Chu (1952–)		2014–2020	Taiwanese American	California	Democratic	Served in the California State Assembly from 2014 to 2020.
Evan Low (1983–)		2014–2024	Chinese American	California	Democratic	Served in the California State Assembly from 2014 to 2024.
Raj Mukherji (1984–)		2014–2024, 2024–present	Indian American	New Jersey	Democratic	Served in the New Jersey General Assembly from 2014 to 2024, including as majority whip and deputy speaker. Serving in the New Jersey Senate since 2024.
Janet Nguyen (1976–)		2014–2018, 2020–2022, 2022–present	Vietnamese American	California	Republican	From 2014 to 2018 Nguyen served in the California State Senate making her the first Vietnamese American to serve in any state senate. After narrowly losing reelection, she ran for and won a seat in the California State Assembly in 2020. In 2022 Nguyen ran again for the California State Senate and won.
Ervin Yen (1954–)		2014–2018	Taiwanese American	Oklahoma	Republican	Served in the Oklahoma Senate from 2014 to 2018.
Mark S. Chang (1978–)		2015–present	Korean American	Maryland	Democratic	Serving in the Maryland House of Delegates since 2015.
Jay Jalisi (1965–)		2015–2023	Pakistani American	Maryland	Democratic	Served in the Maryland House of Delegates from 2015 to 2023.
Clarence Lam (1980–)		2015–2019, 2019–present	Chinese American	Maryland	Democratic	Served in the Maryland House of Delegates from 2015 to 2019 before being elected to the Maryland Senate in 2019, where he is currently.
Rady Mom (1970–)		2015–2025	Cambodian American	Massachusetts	Democratic	Served in the Massachusetts House of Representatives from 2015 to 2025. First Cambodian American elected to any state legislature.
David Moon (1979–)		2015–present	Korean American	Maryland	Democratic	Serving in the Maryland House of Delegates since 2015, and as Majority Leader since 2023.
Cyndi Munson (1985–)		2015–present	Korean American	Oklahoma	Democratic	Serving in the Oklahoma House of Representatives since 2015. First Asian American woman legislator in Oklahoma.
Roxanne Persaud		2015–2015, 2015–present	Indian American	New York	Democratic	Served in the New York State Assembly from January 2015 to November 2015. Serving in the New York Senate since 2015.
Jay Chaudhuri (1978–)		2016–present	Indian American	North Carolina	Democratic	Serving in the North Carolina State Senate since 2016, and as Minority Whip since 2019.
Phillip Chen (1969–)		2016–present	Chinese American	California	Republican	Serving in the California State Assembly since 2016.
Steven Choi (1944–)		2016–2022, 2024–present	Korean American	California	Republican	Served in the California State Assembly from 2016 to 2022. Serving in the California State Senate since 2024.
Vince Fong (1979–)		2016–2024	Chinese American	California	Republican	Served in the California State Assembly from 2016 until 2024.
Todd Gloria (1978–)		2016–2020	Filipino American	California	Democratic	House Majority Whip and member of the California State Assembly from 2016 to 2020.
Ash Kalra (1972–)		2016–present	Indian American	California	Democratic	Serving in the California State Assembly since 2016. First Indian American state legislator in California.
Manka Dhingra (1973 or 1974–)		2017–present	Indian American	Washington	Democratic	Serving in the Washington State Senate since 2017.
Lei Learmont		2017–2018	Japanese American	Hawaii	Democratic	Served in the Hawaii House of Representatives from 2017 to 2018.
Bee Nguyen (1978–)		2017–2023	Vietnamese American	Georgia	Democratic	Served in the Georgia House of Representatives from 2017 to 2023. First Vietnamese American in the Georgia House of Representatives.
Yuh-Line Niou (1983–)		2017–2022	Taiwanese American	New York	Democratic	Served in the New York State Assembly from 2017 to 2022.
Sam Park (1985–)		2017–present	Korean American	Georgia	Democratic	Serving in the Georgia House of Representatives since 2017.
Vandana Slatter (1981–)		2017–present	Indian American	Washington	Democratic	Serving in the Washington State House since 2017.
Dean Tran (1978–)		2017–2021	Vietnamese American	Massachusetts	Republican	Served in the Massachusetts Senate, first Vietnamese American to hold elected office in Massachusetts.
Kathy Tran (1978–)		2018–present	Vietnamese American	Virginia	Democratic	Serving in the Virginia House of Delegates since 2018.
Tyler Diep		2018–2020	Vietnamese American	California	Republican	Served in the California State Assembly.
Vin Gopal (1985–)		2018–present	Indian American	New Jersey	Democratic	Serving in the New Jersey Senate since 2018.
Val Okimoto		2018–2022	Filipino American Japanese American	Hawaii	Republican	Served in the Hawaii House of Representatives. Minority leader from 2021 to 2022.
Rochelle Nguyen		2018–2022, 2022–present	Vietnamese American	Nevada	Democratic	Served in the Nevada Assembly from 2018 to 2022 and in the Nevada Senate since 2022.
Daniel Pae (1995–)		2018–present	Korean American	Oklahoma	Republican	Serving in the Oklahoma House of Representatives.
Abbas Akhil (unknown)		2019–2021	Indian American	New Mexico	Democratic	Served in the New Mexico House of Representatives.
Saud Anwar (1962–)		2019–present	Pakistani American	Connecticut	Democratic	Serving in the Connecticut State Senate.
Harry Bhandari (1977–)		2019–present	Nepalese American	Maryland	Democratic	Serving in the Maryland House of Delegates.
Davina Duerr (1971–)		2019–present	Taiwanese American	Washington	Democratic	Serving in the Washington House of Representatives since 2019.
Kaohly Her (1978–)		2019–2025	Hmong American	Minnesota	Democratic	Served in the Minnesota House of Representatives from 2019 to 2025. Elected as Mayor of Saint Paul in 2025.
Robert Jackson (1950–)		2019–present	Chinese American	New York	Democratic	Serving in the New York State Senate since 2019. Served in the New York City Council from 2002 to 2013.
John Liu (1967–)		2019–present	Taiwanese American	New York	Democratic	Serving in the New York State Senate since 2019. Served in the New York City Council from 2002 to 2009 and as New York City Comptroller from 2010 to 2013. First Asian American elected to citywide office in New York.
Tina Maharath (1978–)		2019–2023	Laotian American	Ohio	Democratic	Served in the Ohio State Senate from 2019 to 2023. First Laotian American elected to public office.
Joe Nguyen (1983–)		2019–2025	Vietnamese American	Washington	Democratic	Served in the Washington State Senate from 2019 to 2025.
Tram Nguyen (1986–)		2019–present	Vietnamese American	Massachusetts	Democratic	Serving in the Massachusetts House of Representatives since 2019.
Jonathan Patterson (unknown)		2019–present	Korean American	Missouri	Republican	Serving as the Speaker of the Missouri House of Representatives.
Lily Qi (1963–)		2019–present	Chinese American	Maryland	Democratic	Serving in the Maryland House of Delegates.
Maria Robinson (1987–)		2019–2022	Korean American	Massachusetts	Democratic	Served in the Massachusetts House of Representatives. Appointed director of the Grid Deployment Office in the Department of Energy by President Joe Biden in 2022.
My-Linh Thai (1968–)		2019–present	Vietnamese American	Washington	Democratic	Serving in the Washington House of Representatives.
Kevin Thomas		2019–2024	Indian American	New York	Democratic	Served in the New York State Senate from 2019 to 2024.
Mike Yin (1986–)		2019–present	Chinese American	Wyoming	Democratic	Serving in the Wyoming House of Representatives since 2019 and as Minority Leader since 2023. First Chinese American state legislator in Wyoming.
Mike Giallombardo (1982–)		2020–present	Korean American	Florida	Republican	Serving in the Florida House of Representatives since 2020.
Alex Lee (1995–)		2020–present	Hong Kong American	California	Democratic	Serving in the California State Assembly since 2020.
Michelle Au (1978–)		2021–2023, 2023–present	Chinese American	Georgia	Democratic	Served in the Georgia State Senate from 2021 to 2023. Serving in the Georgia House of Representatives since 2023.
Charlice Byrd (1951–)		2021–present	Chinese American	Georgia	Republican	Serving in the Georgia house of representatives since 2021.
Jeremy Cooney (1981–)		2021–present	Indian American	New York	Democratic	Serving in the New York State Senate since 2021.
Kimberly Fiorello (1975–)		2021–2023	Korean American	Connecticut	Republican	Served in the Connecticut House of Representatives from 2021 to 2023.
Kay Bounkeua (unknown)		2021–2023	Lao American Chinese American	New Mexico	Democratic	Served in the New Mexico House of Representatives from 2021 to 2023. She was the first Asian American woman to serve as a state legislator in the New Mexico Legislature.
Francesca Hong (1988–)		2021–present	Korean American	Wisconsin	Democratic	Serving in the Wisconsin State Assembly since 2021. She is the first Asian American state legislator to serve in the Wisconsin Legislature.
Vanna Howard		2021–2026, 2026–present	Cambodian American	Massachusetts	Democratic	Served in the Massachusetts House of Representatives from 2021 to 2026, and currently in the Massachusetts Senate.
Marvin Lim (1984–)		2021–present	Filipino American	Georgia	Democratic	Serving in the Georgia House of Representatives since 2021.
Quang Nguyen (1962–)		2021–present	Vietnamese American	Arizona	Republican	Serving in the Arizona House of Representatives since 2021.
Khanh Pham (1978–)		2021–present	Vietnamese American	Oregon	Democratic	Serving in the Oregon House of Representatives since 2021. She is the first Vietnamese American to serve in the Oregon Legislative Assembly.
Jenifer Rajkumar (1982–)		2021–present	Indian American	New York	Democratic	Serving in the New York State Assembly since 2021.
Nikil Saval (1982–)		2021–present	Indian American	Pennsylvania	Democratic	Serving in the Pennsylvania State Senate since 2021, and first Asian American elected to that chamber.
Sterley Stanley (1966–)		2021–present	Indian American	New Jersey	Democratic	Serving in the New Jersey General Assembly since 2021.
Shri Thanedar (1955–)		2021–2023	Indian American	Michigan	Democratic	Served in the Michigan House of Representatives from 2021 to 2023.
David Alcos (1967 or 1968–)		2022–present	Filipino American	Hawaii	Republican	Serving in the Hawaii House of Representatives since 2022.
Jasmeet Bains (1985–)		2022–present	Indian American	California	Democratic	Serving in the California State Assembly since 2022.
Luz Bay		2022–present	Filipino American	New Hampshire	Democratic	Serving in the New Hampshire House of Representatives since 2022.
Elle Cochran		2022–present	Filipino American	Hawaii	Republican (2026–present)	Serving in the Hawaii House of Representatives since 2022. Switched parties from Democratic to Republican in 2026.
Mike Fong (1976–)		2022–present	Chinese American	California	Democratic	Serving in the California State Assembly since 2022.
Diamond Garcia (1997–)		2022–present	Filipino American	Hawaii	Republican	Serving in the Hawaii House of Representatives since 2022. Served as the Chair of the Hawaii Republican Party from January 2023 to May 2023.
Andrew Takuya Garrett		2022–present	Japanese American	Hawaii	Democratic	Serving in the Hawaii House of Representatives since 2022.
Shama Haider (1948–)		2022–present	Pakistani American	New Jersey	Democratic	Serving in the New Jersey General Assembly since 2022.
Sadaf Jaffer (1983–)		2022–2024	Indian American; Pakistani American	New Jersey	Democratic	Served in the New Jersey General Assembly from 2022 to 2024.
Maryam Khan (1988–)		2022–present	Pakistani American	Connecticut	Democratic	Member of the Connecticut House of Representatives since 2022.
Stephanie Nguyen (1979–)		2022–present	Vietnamese American	California	Democratic	Serving in the California State Assembly since 2022.
Ellen Park (1972–)		2022–present	Korean American	New Jersey	Democratic	Serving in the New Jersey General Assembly since 2022.
Anil Beephan Jr. (1994–)		2023–present	Indian American	New York	Republican	Serving in the New York State Assembly since 2023.
Salman Bhojani (1980–)		2023–present	Pakistani American	Texas	Democratic	Serving in the Texas House of Representatives since 2023.
Maria Cervania (1968–)		2023–present	Filipino American	North Carolina	Democratic	Serving in the North Carolina House of Representatives since 2023.
Lester Chang (1973–)		2023–present	Chinese American	New York	Republican	Serving in the New York State Assembly since 2023.
Iwen Chu (1978–)		2023–2024	Taiwanese American	New York	Democratic	Served in the New York State Senate from 2023 to 2024. Lost reelection in 2024.
Saira Draper		2023–present	Pakistani American	Georgia	Democratic	Serving in the Georgia House of Representatives since 2023.
Victoria Gu		2023–present	Chinese American	Rhode Island	Democratic	Serving in the Rhode Island Senate since 2023. First Asian American legislator in Rhode Island with Linda Ujifusa.
Soo Hong		2023–present	Korean American	Georgia	Republican	Serving in the Georgia House of Representatives since 2023.
Hoan Huynh (1990–)		2023–present	Vietnamese American	Illinois	Democratic	Serving in the Illinois House of Representatives since 2023.
Justin Jones (1995–)		2023–present	Filipino American	Tennessee	Democratic	Served in the Tennessee House of Representatives from January 10, 2023, to April 6, 2023, upon being expelled. Reelected in a special election in August 2023.
Tarik Khan (1978–)		2023–present	Pakistani American	Pennsylvania	Democratic	Serving in the Pennsylvania House of Representatives since 2023.
Trish La Chica		2023–present	Filipino American	Hawaii	Democratic	Serving in the Hawaii House of Representatives since 2023.
Grace Lee (1982 or 1983–)		2023–present	Korean American	New York	Democratic	Serving in the New York State Assembly since 2023.
Ya Liu (1981–)		2023–present	Chinese American	North Carolina	Democratic	Serving in the North Carolina House of Representatives since 2023, and as Minority Whip since 2025.
Rose Martinez (1958–)		2023–present	Filipino American	Hawaii	Democratic	Serving in the Hawaii House of Representatives since 2023.
Tyson Miyake		2023–present	Japanese American	Hawaii	Democratic	Serving in the Hawaii House of Representatives since 2023.
Daniel Nguyen		2023–present	Vietnamese American	Oregon	Democratic	Serving in the Oregon House of Representatives since 2023.
Nabilah Parkes (1989–)		2023–present	Bangladeshi American	Georgia	Democratic	Serving in the Georgia House of Representatives since 2023.
Steven Raga		2023–present	Filipino American	New York	Democratic	Serving in the New York State Assembly since 2023. First Filipino American state legislator in New York.
MD Rahman		2023–present	Bangladeshi American	Connecticut	Democratic	Serving in the Connecticut State Senate since 2023.
Sarahana Shrestha (1981–)		2023–present	Nepalese American	New York	Democratic	Serving in the New York State Assembly since 2023.
Anita Somani		2023–present	Indian American	Ohio	Democratic	Serving in the Ohio House of Representatives since 2023.
Priya Sundareshan (1984–)		2023–present	Indian American	Arizona	Democratic	Serving in the Arizona Senate since 2023, and as Minority Leader since 2025.
Reena Szczepanski (1976 or 1977–)		2023–present	Indian American	New Mexico	Democratic	Serving in the New Mexico House of Representatives since 2023, and as Majority Leader since 2025.
Tri Ta (1973–)		2023–present	Vietnamese American	California	Republican	Serving in the California State Assembly since 2023.
Long Tran		2023–present	Vietnamese American	Georgia	Democratic	Serving in the Georgia House of Representatives since 2023.
Linda Ujifusa		2023–present	Japanese American	Rhode Island	Democratic	Serving in the Rhode Island Senate since 2023. First Asian American legislator in Rhode Island with Victoria Gu.
Arvind Venkat (1974–)		2023–present	Indian American	Pennsylvania	Democratic	Serving in the Pennsylvania House of Representatives since 2023.
Sarah Wolek (1979–)		2023–present	Pakistani American	Maryland	Democratic	Serving in the Maryland House of Delegates since 2023.
Chao Wu (1976 or 1977–)		2023–present	Chinese American	Maryland	Democratic	Serving in the Maryland House of Delegates since 2023.
Al Barlas (1981–)		2024–present	Pakistani American	New Jersey	Republican	Serving in the New Jersey General Assembly since 2024.
Suraj Budathoki		2024–present	Bhutanese American	New Hampshire	Democratic	Serving in the New Hampshire House of Representatives since 2024.
Jessica Caloza		2024–present	Filipino American	California	Democratic	Serving in the California State Assembly since 2024.
Manoj Chourasia		2024–present	Indian American	New Hampshire	Democratic	Serving in the New Hampshire House of Representatives since 2024.
Sanjeev Manohar		2024–present	Indian American	New Hampshire	Democratic	Serving in the New Hampshire House of Representatives since 2024.
May Mizuno (1969 or 1970–)		2024–present	Filipino American	Hawaii	Democratic	Serving in the Hawaii House of Representatives since 2024.
Hanadi Nadeem (1972–)		2024–present	Pakistani American	Nevada	Democratic	Serving in the Nevada Assembly since 2024.
Edwin Obras (1971–)		2024–present	Filipino American	Washington	Democratic	Serving in the Washington House of Representatives since 2024.
Darshana Patel (1974–)		2024–present	Indian American	California	Democratic	Serving in the California State Assembly since 2024.
Santosh Salvi		2024–present	Indian American	New Hampshire	Democratic	Serving in the New Hampshire House of Representatives since 2024.
Yasmin Trudeau		2024–present	Bangladeshi American	Washington	Democratic	Serving in the Washington State Senate since 2024.
Steve Chan (1966–)		2025–present	Hong Kong American	New York	Republican	Serving in the New York State Senate since 2025.
Sujata Gadkar-Wilcox (1979–)		2025–present	Indian American	Connecticut	Democratic	Serving in the Connecticut House of Representatives since 2025.
Tara Hong		2025–present	Cambodian American	Massachusetts	Democratic	Serving in the Massachusetts House of Representatives since 2025.
John Arthur		2025–present	Korean American	Utah	Democratic	Serving in the Utah House of Representatives since 2025.
Hoang Nguyen		2025–present	Vietnamese American	Utah	Democratic	Serving in the Utah House of Representatives since 2025.
Osman Salahuddin (1996–)		2025–present	Pakistani American	Washington	Democratic	Serving in the Washington House of Representatives since 2025.
Eleanor Sato		2025–present	Japanese American	Maine	Democratic	Serving in the Maine House of Representatives since 2025.
Balvir Singh (1984–)		2025–present	Indian American	New Jersey	Democratic	Serving in the New Jersey General Assembly since 2025.
Janice Zahn (1965–)		2025–present	Hong Kong American	Washington	Democratic	Serving in the Washington House of Representatives since 2025.
Ravinder Bhalla (1973–)		2026–present	Indian American	New Jersey	Democratic	Serving in the New Jersey General Assembly since 2026. Mayor of Hoboken from 2018 to 2026.
Kenny Nguyen (1994 or 1995–)		2026–present	Vietnamese American	Colorado	Democratic	Serving in the Colorado House of Representatives since 2026.
Jyot Singh		2027–present	Indian American	Georgia	Democratic	Serving in the Georgia House of Representatives since 2027.
Michelle Kang		2027–present	Korean American	Georgia	Democratic	Serving in the Georgia House of Representatives since 2027.
Rahim Asani		2027–present	Pakistani American	Georgia	Democratic	Serving in the Georgia House of Representatives since 2027.

==== Mayors ====
Name	Image	Term	Ethnicity	State	Party	Offices held
Kinjiro Matsudaira (1885–1963)		1927, 1943	Japanese American	Maryland		Mayor of Edmonston, Maryland, elected in 1927 and 1943
James Kanno (1925–2017)		1957–1962	Japanese American	California		First mayor of Fountain Valley, California
Norman Mineta (1931–2022)		1971–1975	Japanese American	California	Democratic	Served as mayor of San Jose, California.
Sak Yamamoto (1914–1997)		1973–1974, 1977–1979	Japanese American	California		Mayor of Carson, California
Eduardo Malapit (1933–2007)		1974–1982	Filipino American	Hawaii	Independent	Mayor of Kauaʻi County, Hawaii
S. Floyd Mori (1939–)		1974–1975	Japanese American	California	Democratic	Mayor of Pleasanton, California
Monty Manibog (1930–2016)		1976–1988	Filipino American	California	Democratic	Mayor of Monterey Park, California
Eunice Sato (1921–2021)		1980–1982	Japanese American	California	Republican	Mayor of Long Beach, California
Nao Takasugi (1922–2009)		1982–1992	Japanese American	California	Republican	Mayor of Oxnard, California elected in 1982 and re-elected four times
JoAnn Yukimura (1949/1950–)		1988–1994	Japanese American	Hawaii		Mayor of Kauai County starting in 1988
Judy Chu (1953–)		1989–1994	Chinese American	California	Democratic	Three term mayor of Monterey Park, California starting in 1989
Lorraine Inouye (1940–)		1990–1992	Filipino American	Hawaii	Independent	Mayor of Hawaii County, Hawaii
Carol Liu (1941–)		1992– 2000	Chinese American	California	Democratic	Mayor of La Cañada Flintridge
Stephen K. Yamashiro (1941–2011)		1992–2000	Japanese American	Hawaii	Independent	Mayor of Hawaii County, Hawaii
Jimmie R. Yee (1934–)		1999–2000	Chinese American	California	Democratic	Mayor of Sacramento, California
Harry Kim (1939–)		2000–2008, 2016–2020	Korean American	Hawaii	Independent	Mayor of Hawaii County, Hawaii
Alan Nakanishi (1940–)		2000–2001, 2012–2013, 2017–2018, 2020–2021	Japanese American	California	Republican	Mayor of Lodi, California for four two-year terms
Alan Arakawa (1951–)		2003–2007, 2011–2019	Japanese American	Hawaii	Independent	Mayor of Maui County, Hawaii
Otto Lee (1967–)		2005–2007	Chinese American	California	Democratic	Mayor of Sunnyvale, California
Ken Miyagishima (1963–)		2007–2023	Japanese American	New Mexico	Democratic	Four-term mayor of Las Cruces, New Mexico first elected in 2007
Sukhee Kang (1952–)		2008–2012	Korean American	California	Democratic	Mayor of Irvine, California
Evan Low (1983–)		2009–2015	Chinese American	California	Democratic	Mayor of Campbell, California
Marilyn Strickland (1962–)		2010–2018	Korean American	Washington	Democratic	Mayor of Tacoma, Washington
Ed Lee (1952–2017)		2011–2017	Chinese American	California	Democratic	Served as first Asian American mayor of San Francisco until his death in 2017.
Jean Quan (1949–)		2011–2015	Chinese American	California	Democratic	Mayor of Oakland, California 2011–2015
Steven Choi (1944–)		2012–2016	Korean American	California	Republican	Mayor of Irvine, California
Bao Nguyen (1980–)		2014–2016	Vietnamese American	California	Democratic	Mayor of Garden Grove, California
Karen Goh (1955–)		2017–present	Chinese American	California	Republican	Mayor of Bakersfield, California
Ron Nirenberg (1977–)		2017–2025	Filipino American, Malaysian American, Indian American	Texas	Independent	Mayor of San Antonio, Texas
Ravinder Bhalla (1974–)		2018–2026	Indian American	New Jersey	Democratic	Mayor of Hoboken, New Jersey
Derek Kawakami (1977–)		2018–present	Japanese American	Hawaii	Independent	Mayor of Kauaʻi County, Hawaii
Harry Sidhu (1957–)		2018–2022	Indian American	California	Republican	Mayor of Anaheim, California
An Truong (1949–)		2019–present	Vietnamese American	Texas	Nonpartisan	Mayor of Haltom City, Texas
Farrah Khan (1971–)		2020–present	Pakistani American	California	Democratic	Mayor of Irvine, California
Todd Gloria (1978–)		2020–present	Filipino American	California	Democratic	Mayor of San Diego
Sumbul Siddiqui (1988–)		2020–present	Pakistani American	Massachusetts	Democratic	Mayor of Cambridge, Massachusetts
Michelle Wu (1985–)		2021–present	Taiwanese American	Massachusetts	Democratic	Mayor of Boston, Massachusetts
Jaideep “JD” Mangat		2021–2025	Indian American	Colorado	Democratic	Mayor of Lafayette, Colorado
Sokhary Chau		2022–present	Cambodian American	Massachusetts		Mayor of Lowell, Massachusetts
Bruce Harrell (1958–)		2022–2026	Japanese American	Washington	Democratic	Mayor of Seattle, Washington
Xay Khamsyvoravong		2022–2024	Lao American	Rhode Island		Mayor of Newport, Rhode Island
Aftab Pureval (1982–)		2022–present	Indian American, Tibetan American	Ohio	Democratic	Mayor of Cincinnati, Ohio
Helen Tran (1981 or 1982–)		2022–present	Vietnamese American	California	Democratic	Mayor of San Bernardino, California
Sheng Thao (1985–)		2023–2024	Hmong American	California	Democratic	Mayor of Oakland, California
Tyrin Truong (2000–)		2023–present	Vietnamese American	Louisiana	Democratic	Mayor of Bogalusa, Louisiana
Arunan Arulampalam (1985–)		2024–present	Sri Lankan American	Connecticut	Democratic	Mayor of Hartford, Connecticut
Adena Ishii (1990–)		2024–present	Japanese American	California	Democratic	Mayor of Berkeley, California
Lily Wu (1984–)		2024–present	Chinese American	Kansas	Libertarian	Mayor of Wichita, Kansas
Danny Avula		2025-present	Indian American	Virginia	Democratic	Mayor of Richmond, Virginia
Ranae Bartlett		2025–present	Korean American	Alabama		Mayor of Madison, Alabama
Kaohly Her (1973–)		2026–present	Hmong American	Minnesota	Democratic	Mayor of St. Paul, Minnesota
Gina Ortiz Jones (1981–)		2026–present	Filipino American	Texas	Democratic	Mayor of San Antonio, Texas
Zohran Mamdani (1991–)		2026–present	Indian American	New York	Democratic	Mayor of New York City, New York
Fred Hashimoto		2026–present	Japanese American	New Mexico	Democratic	Mayor of Corrales, New Mexico

==== Historic ====
Benito Legarda and Pablo Ocampo, joined the House in 1907 as Resident Commissioners, becoming the first Asian Americans to serve in the Congress, albeit as non-voting members.

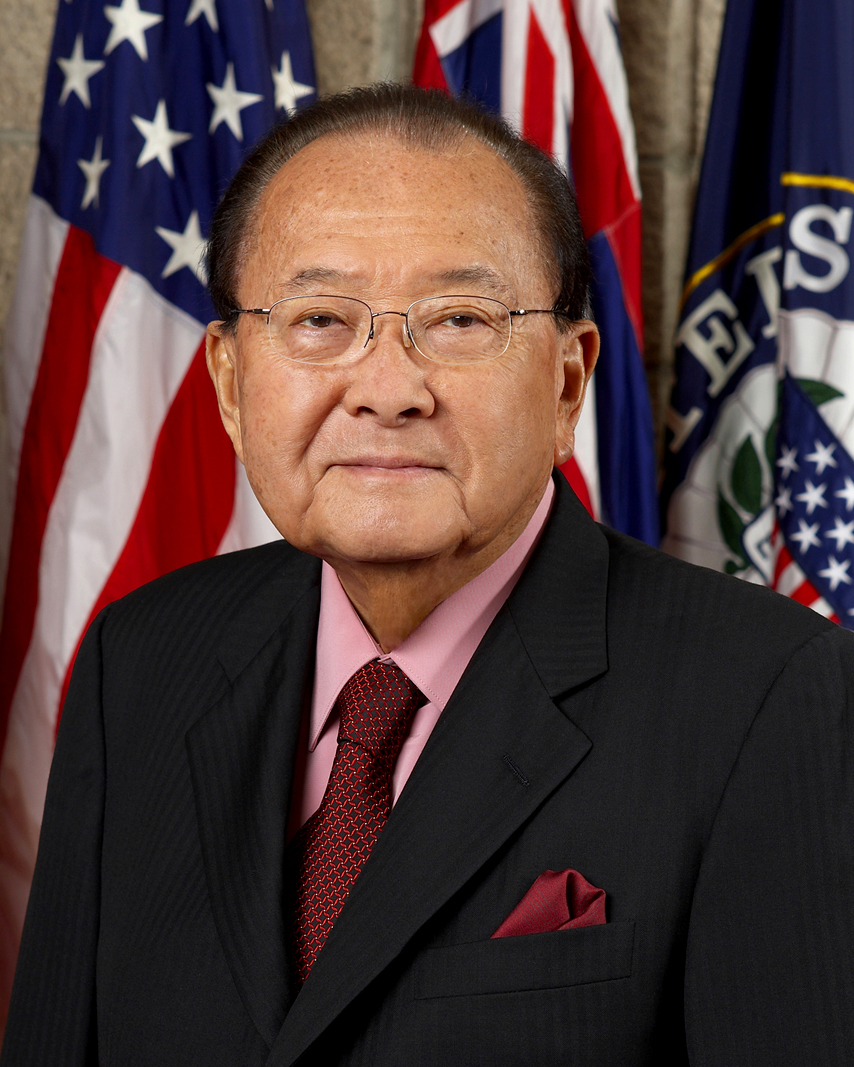
Senator Daniel Inouye of Hawaii was the President pro tempore of the United States Senate and the highest-ranking Asian American in congressional history.

In 2010, Inouye was sworn in as President Pro Tempore making him the highest-ranking Asian American politician in American history until Kamala Harris was the first Asian American to become Vice President of the United States in November 2020, and assumed the role of President of the U.S. Senate.

==== Current ====
There are presently 16 Asian Americans or Pacific Islanders in the House and 2 in the Senate in the 118th United States Congress. The following marks the total number of Asian Americans in the U.S. Congress since 1957: 39 representatives and 9 senators. Representatives include those from Japanese, Taiwanese, Filipino, Thai, Indian, and Chinese backgrounds.

- Representatives Doris Matsui, Mark Takano, Jill Tokuda, and Senator Mazie Hirono are Japanese American.
- Representative Judy Chu is Chinese American.
- Representatives Grace Meng and Ted Lieu are Taiwanese Americans.
- Representative Bobby Scott is Filipino American.
- Senator Tammy Duckworth is Thai American.
- Representatives Ami Bera, Raja Krishnamoorthi, Pramila Jayapal, Ro Khanna, and Shri Thanedar are Indian American.
- Representatives Andy Kim, Michelle Steel, Young Kim, and Marilyn Strickland are Korean American.

Note that Strickland and Scott are all multiracial. Strickland is one-half Korean and one-half African American; Scott is one-fourth Filipino and three-fourths African American.

=== Cabinet ===
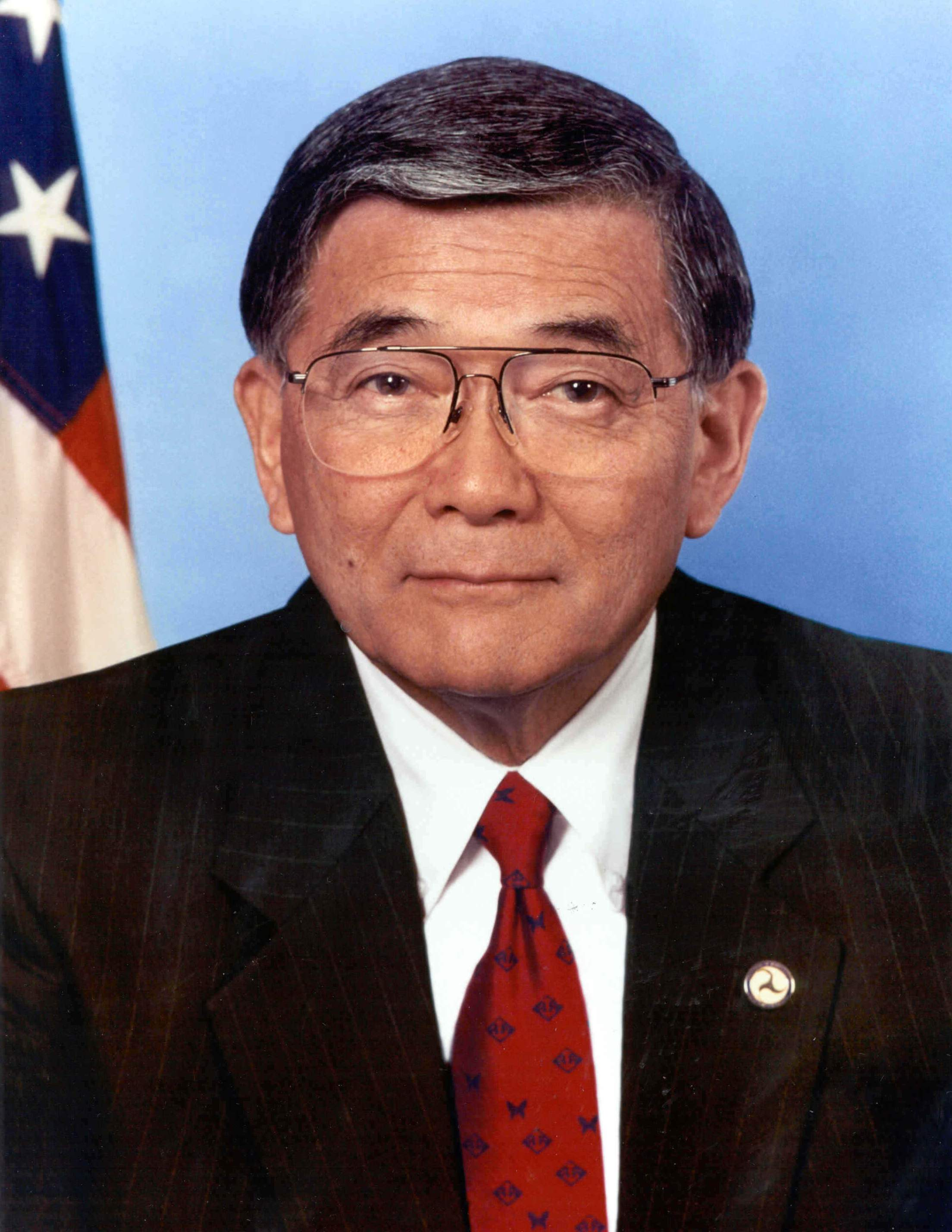
Norman Mineta, first Asian American cabinet member

Norman Mineta became the first Asian American Cabinet member when he was appointed secretary of commerce by President Bill Clinton in 2000. He then served as secretary of transportation from 2001 to 2006.

In the George W. Bush Administration, Elaine Chao became the first, and thus far only, Asian American woman to serve as a Cabinet secretary when she became the secretary of labor in 2001, serving until 2009. She has also served as secretary of transportation in the administration of Donald Trump in 2017, serving until her resignation in 2021.

In 2009, President Barack Obama appointed Eric Shinseki to the position of secretary of veterans affairs, which he held until 2014. Shinseki was the first Asian American to hold this position. Steven Chu, the first Asian American to hold the position of secretary of energy, served from 2009 to 2013. Additionally under Obama, Gary Locke served as secretary of commerce from 2009 to 2011.

In 2017, President Donald Trump appointed Nikki Haley the first Indian American to serve in a permanent Cabinet-level position when she was confirmed to the position of ambassador to the United Nations in 2017. She held the position until 2018.

In 2021, Kamala Harris became the highest ranking Asian American to serve in a cabinet as 49th Vice President of the United States. President Joe Biden also appointed Katherine Tai to serve as U.S. Trade Representative, a cabinet-level position.

== Presidential and vice-presidential candidates ==
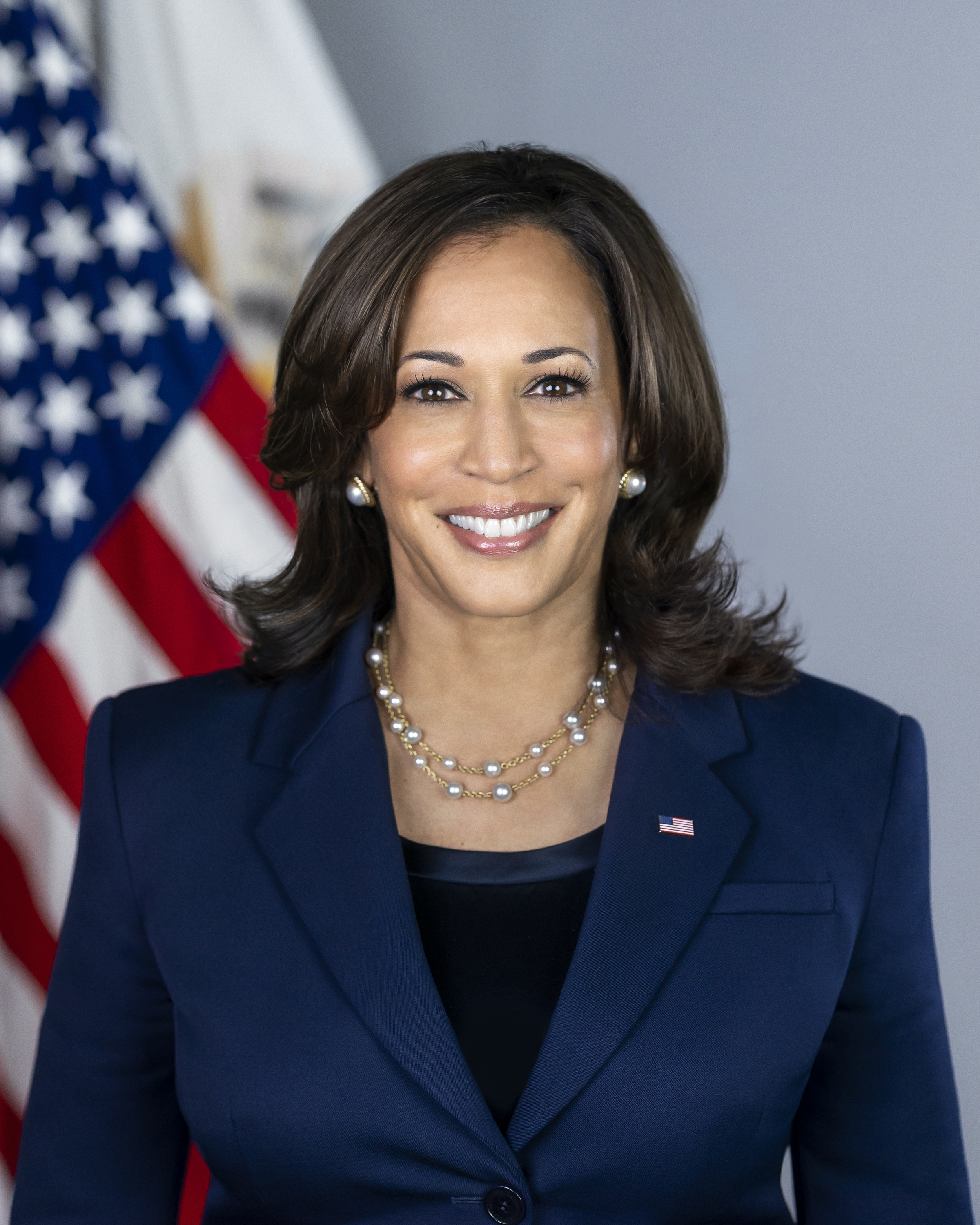
Official portrait of the 49th Vice President Kamala Harris, 2021

In 1964, Hiram Fong, a Republican, became the first Asian American candidate for president.

In 1972, Patsy Mink became the first Asian American Democratic candidate for president, and the first Japanese American candidate for president.

In 2015, Bobby Jindal, a Republican, became the first Indian American candidate for president.

In 2017, Andrew Yang became the first Taiwanese American and the first Asian American male Democratic candidate for president.

In 2020, Tulsi Gabbard, who is of Samoan descent became the second woman of color and the first Asian American and Pacific-Islander (AAPI) presidential candidate to earn major party primary delegates.

In 2020, Kamala Harris became the first Asian American major party candidate for vice president, and later elected the first Asian American vice president of the United States.

In 2024, Nikki Haley became the first Asian American woman and South Asian (Indian) woman to run as a Republican candidate for president. She was also the first woman to win a Republican presidential primary contest.

== Voting trends and party affiliation ==
Year	Presidential candidate	Political party	% of Asian vote	Result
1992	George H. W. Bush	Republican	55%	Lost
1996	Bob Dole	Republican	48%	Lost
2000	Al Gore	Democratic	55%	Lost
2004	John Kerry	Democratic	56%	Lost
2008	Barack Obama	Democratic	62%	Won
2012	Barack Obama	Democratic	73%	Won
2016	Hillary Clinton	Democratic	65%	Lost
2020	Joe Biden	Democratic	63%	Won
2024	Kamala Harris	Democratic	54%	Lost

From the 1940s to the 1990s most Asian Americans were anti-communist refugees who had fled mainland China, North Korea or Vietnam, and were strongly anti-Communist. Many had ties to conservative organizations. In recent years, more liberal Asian American groups such as newer Chinese and Indian immigrants have greatly changed the Asian American political demographics, as well as a larger proportion of younger Asian Americans, many of whom have completed college degrees.

During the 1990s and 2000s, Asian American voting behavior shifted from moderate support for the Republican Party to stronger support for the Democratic Party. In the 1992 presidential election Republican George H. W. Bush received 55% of the Asian American vote compared to 30% for Democrat Bill Clinton. Asian Americans voted Republican and were the only racial group more conservative than whites in the 1990s, according to surveys. By the 2004 election, Democrat John Kerry won 56% of the Asian American vote, with Chinese and Indian Americans tending to support Kerry, and Vietnamese and Filipino Americans tending to support George Bush. Japanese Americans leaned toward Kerry, while Korean Americans leaned toward Bush. Democrat Barack Obama won 62% of the Asian American vote in the 2008 presidential election, with the margin increasing during the 2012 presidential election, where Asian Americans voted to re-elect Obama by 73%. In the 2014 midterm elections, based on exit polls, 50% of Asian Americans voted Republican, while 49% voted Democrat; this swing toward voting for Republicans was a shift from the strong Democratic vote in 2012, and had not reached 50% since 1996. The 2016 National Asian American Survey, conducted before the 2016 presidential election, found that 55% of Asian American registered voters supported Democratic candidate Hillary Clinton and only 14% supported Republican candidate Donald Trump.

Despite their growing trend of voting for Democrats in national elections, Asian Americans have tended to identify as independents and have not developed strong ties to political parties as a group. Due to the smaller size of the groups population, in comparison to the population as a whole, it has been difficult to get an adequate sampling to forecast voter outcomes for Asian Americans. In 2008, polls indicated that 35% considered themselves non-partisan, 32% Democrats, 19% independents, and 14% Republicans. The 2012 National Asian American Survey found that 51% considered themselves non-partisan, 33% Democrats, 14% Republicans, and 2% Other; Hmong, Indian, and Korean Americans strongly identified as Democrats, and Filipino and Vietnamese Americans most strongly identified as Republicans. In 2013, according to the Asian American Legal Defense and Education Fund, Chinese Americans were the least likely Asian American ethnicity to have a party affiliation, with only one third belonging to a party. The 2016 National Asian American Survey found that 41% of Asian Americans identified as non-partisan, 41% as Democrats (a modest increase from 2008 and 2012), and 16% as Republicans.

Neither the Republican nor Democratic parties have financed significant efforts to the registration of Asian Americans, however much more attention has been focused on contributions from Asian Americans, having once been referred to as potential "Republican Jews". As recently as 2006, the outreach efforts of America's two major political parties have been unbalanced, with the Democratic Party devoting more resources in attracting Asian Americans. In 2016, a majority of Asian Americans possessed the same political views on racial profiling, education, social security, and immigration reform as the Democratic Party; the efforts to attract Asian Americans has produced a proportionally significant growth in Democratic affiliation by Asian Americans from 2012 to 2016 by 12 percent. In 2016, Vietnamese and Filipinos were the least likely Asian Americans to support the presidential campaign of Hillary Clinton, with Vietnamese the most likely to back the presidential campaign of Donald Trump. Political affiliation aside, Asian Americans have trended to become more politically active as a whole, with 2008 seeing an increase of voter participation by 4% to a 49% voting rate. In 2017, it was reported by The Washington Post that Asian Americans born outside of the United States trended to be more conservative, and more likely to identify as Republicans, while those who were born in the United States, who were generally younger, were more likely to identify being a Democrat.

The pejorative term boba liberalism exists as a criticism of mainstream Asian American liberal politics or those perceived to be part of an Asian American liberal elite.

== See also ==
- Ethnocultural politics in the United States
- 80-20 Initiative
- Asian American and Pacific Islands American conservatism in the United States
- List of Asian Americans in politics
- List of Asian Pacific American Democrats
- Resident Commissioner of the Philippines
