= Cottonwood Mall =

Cottonwood Mall may refer to:

- Cottonwood Mall (Albuquerque, New Mexico)
- Cottonwood Mall (Holladay, Utah)
