= Kanno =

Kanno may refer to:

== People ==
- Aya Kanno, manga artist
- James Kanno, elected as the first mayor of California's Fountain Valley.
- Miho Kanno, Japanese actress and singer
- Mohamed Kanno, Saudi Arabian footballer
- Naoe Kanno, a fictional character from the anime/manga Strike Witches
- Takeshi Kanno, Japanese writer
- Yoko Kanno, composer and musician
- Yugo Kanno, composer and musician

Kannō (with a macron) may refer to:

- Kannō (観応), Japanese era from 1350 to 1352
