= Karen Morgan (disambiguation) =

Karen Morgan (born 1952) is a politician from Utah.

Karen Morgan may also refer to:

- Karen Morgan, character in Bitten (TV series)
- Karen Morgan, character in Mr. Morgan's Last Love
