= Carlene M. Walker =

American politician and businesswoman

Member of the Utah Senate from the 8th district
- In office 2001–2009
- Preceded by: Scott Howell
- Succeeded by: Karen Morgan

Personal details
- Born: September 2, 1947 (age 78) San Francisco, California, U.S.
- Party: Republican
- Spouse: Gordon
- Occupation: Businesswoman
- Website: Legislative Website

Carlene M. Walker is an American politician and businesswoman from Utah. A Republican, she was a member of the Utah State Senate, representing the state's 8th senate district in Salt Lake County, from 2001 to 2009. Later she was chairwoman of the state DUI committee. Walker received her bachelor's degree from Brigham Young University in 1969.

Walker received her bachelor's degree from Brigham Young University in 1969.

Her daughter and son-in-law, Kelly and James Jensen, were arrested in April 2025 for allegedly smuggling more than $300 million worth of oil from Mexico to the US with the help of drug cartels.
