= Brian Shiozawa =

American politician

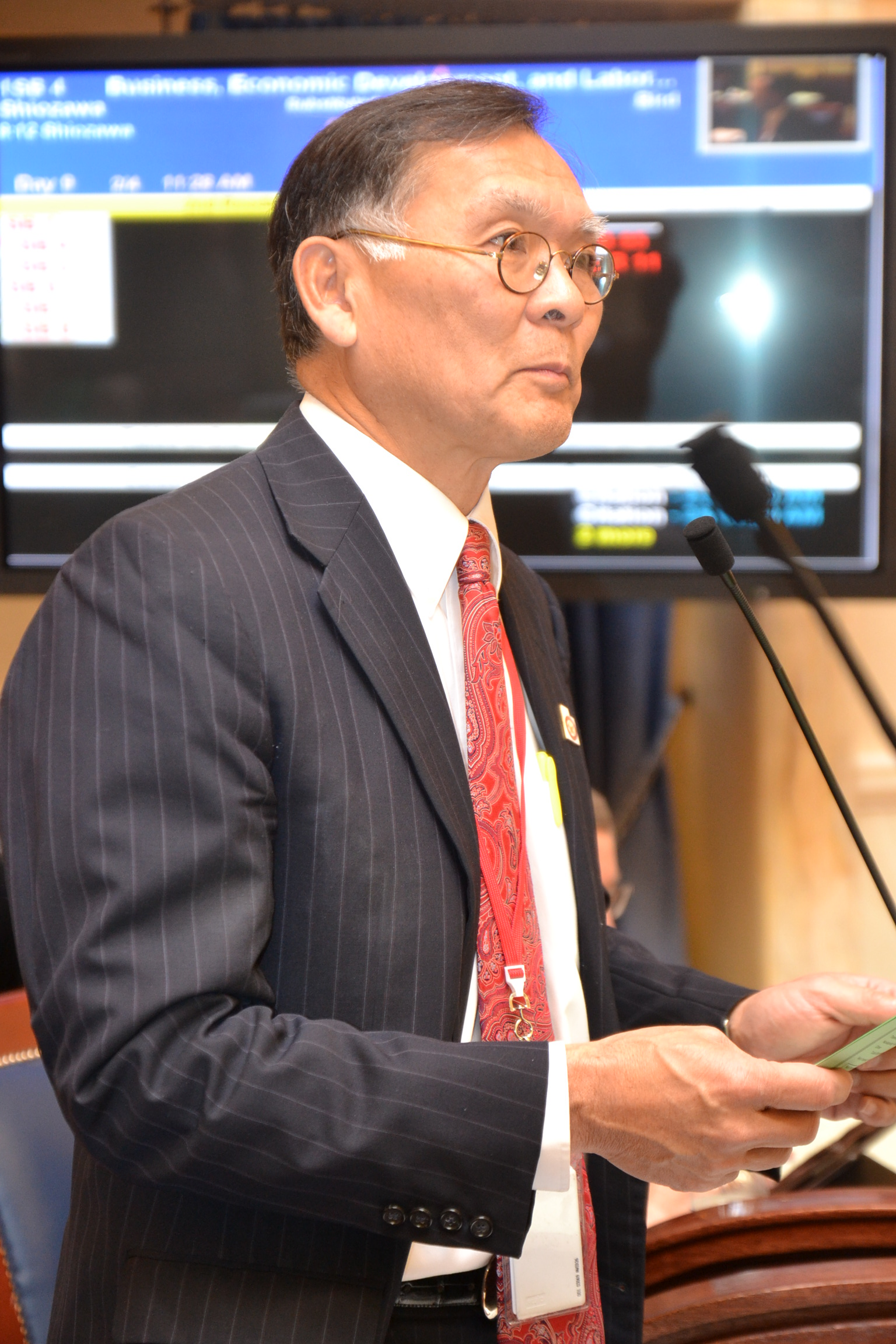

Member of the Utah Senate from the 8th district
- In office January 1, 2013 – December 11, 2017
- Preceded by: Karen Morgan
- Succeeded by: Brian Zehnder

Personal details
- Party: Republican
- Spouse: Joye
- Education: Stanford University; University of Washington
- Profession: Emergency physician
- Website: voteshiozawa.com

Brian E. Shiozawa is an American politician and a former Republican member of the Utah State Senate representing District 8 from January 1, 2013 to December 11, 2017.

== Early life, education, and career ==
Shiozawa is a third generation Japanese American.

Shiozawa earned his BS from Stanford University, his MD from the University of Washington, and his residency at the University of Utah. He is married to Joye, and together they have four children who are mostly grown up. He is a long time resident of Cottonwood Heights. He has been working full-time, for over twenty years, at St. Marks Hospital Emergency Department in Salt Lake City, Utah. He is the Past President of the Utah Medical Association, which represents over 3000 physicians in the State of Utah. Shiozawa says he is guided by his faith. He is a member of the Church of Jesus Christ of Latter-day Saints.

== Background ==
- American College of Emergency Physicians (Fellow)
- American Board of Emergency Medicine (board certified)
- Utah Medical Association (Past President)
- St. Marks Hospital (Board of Trustees)
- Emergency Physicians Integrated Care (Board of Directors)
- Utah Hospital Association (Board of Trustees)

== Political career ==
In 2012 District 8 Democratic Senator Karen Morgan left the Legislature and her seat became open, Shiozawa was selected from among three candidates (a fourth withdrew) by the Republican convention for the November 6, 2012 General election, which he won with 22,156 votes (56.8%) against Democratic nominee Josie Valdez. Before his election in 2012, Shiozawa served as Past President for the Medical Staff at St. Mark's Hospital, Chairman of the Credentials Committee at St. Mark's Hospital, a member of Governor's Healthcare Task Force, and a member of Lt. Governor's Taskforce on Medical Liability Reform.

During the 2016 Legislative session, Shiozawa served on the following committees:

- Business, Economic Development, and Labor Appropriations Subcommittee (Senate Chair)
- Social Services Appropriations Subcommittee
- Senate Health and Human Services Committee
- Senate Natural Resources, Agriculture, and Environment Committee

== Legislation ==
=== 2016 bills sponsored ===
Bill number and Title	Bill status
S.B. 4 Substitute Business, Economic Development, and Labor Base Budget	Governor Signed 2/16/2016
S.B. 32 Reauthorization of Hospital Provider Assessment Act	Governor Signed 3/28/2016
S.B. 106 Assault Offense Amendments	Governor Signed 3/28/2016
S.B. 137 County Option Funding for Botanical, Cultural, Recreational, and Zoological Organizations and Facilities	Governor Signed 3/28/2016
S.B. 199 Skilled Nursing Facility Amendments	Governor Signed 3/28/2016
S.C.R 11 Concurrent Resolution Urging the Rescheduling of Marijuana	Governor Signed 3/17/2016

=== Notable legislation ===
In 2014, Senator Shiozawa introduced SB 251, which gave a number of options for Medicaid expansion that is offered with the Affordable Care Act to help those in the "Medicaid gap." The “Medicaid gap” is a term used for low-income Utahns who live just above the poverty line—their incomes being slightly too high to qualify for Medicaid, but too low to afford private health insurance. Although SB 251 did not pass in its completeness, it gave Governor Herbert more options to deal with the Medicaid expansion problems facing Utah.

Shiozawa also introduced SB 55 in 2014. This bill was passed and gives $1.5 million in one-time funding to expand a pilot program for Insurance companies to provide coverage for children with Autism, which Shiozawa believes would yield more accurate statistical data as a result. The bill did not pass in its original form, which would have required insurance coverage for children diagnosed with autism spectrum disorder. However, it is a start that Senator Shiozawa thought was important.

In 2016 Senator Shiozowa passed a concurrent resolution calling for the rescheduling of marijuana to a schedule II drug. The resolution also encourages researchers to study the benefits of the drug.
