= List of Asian Pacific American Democrats =

The following is an alphabetically ordered list of notable Asian Pacific American members of the United States Democratic Party, past and present.

== A ==
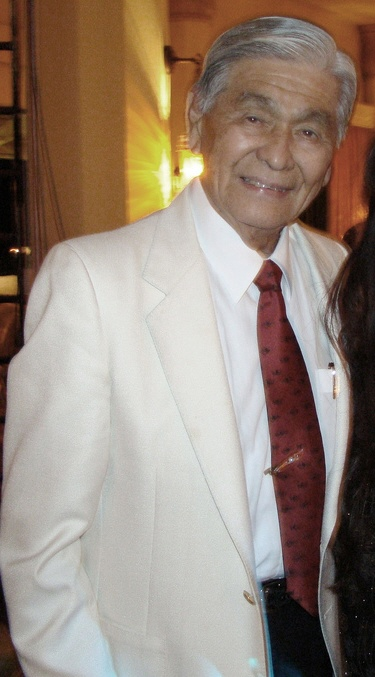
George Ariyoshi, the first Asian-American Governor

- Daniel Akaka, former Senator from Hawaii
- George Ariyoshi, 3rd Governor of Hawaii

== B ==
- Kumar P. Barve, Majority Leader of the Maryland House of Delegates
- Ami Bera, Congressman from California
- Madeleine Bordallo, Congressional Delegate from Guam

== C ==
- Ben Cayetano, 5th Governor of Hawaii
- Hansen Clarke, former Congressman from Minnesota
- Judy Chu, Congresswoman from California
- Steven Chu, former United States Secretary of Energy
- TJ Cox, former Congressman from California

== D ==
- Tammy Duckworth, Senator from Illinois
- Mervyn Dymally, former Congressman from California

== E ==
- March Fong Eu, former Secretary of State of California

== F ==
- Eni Faleomavaega, former Congressional Delegate from American Samoa

== G ==
- Tulsi Gabbard, former Congresswoman from Hawaii

== H ==
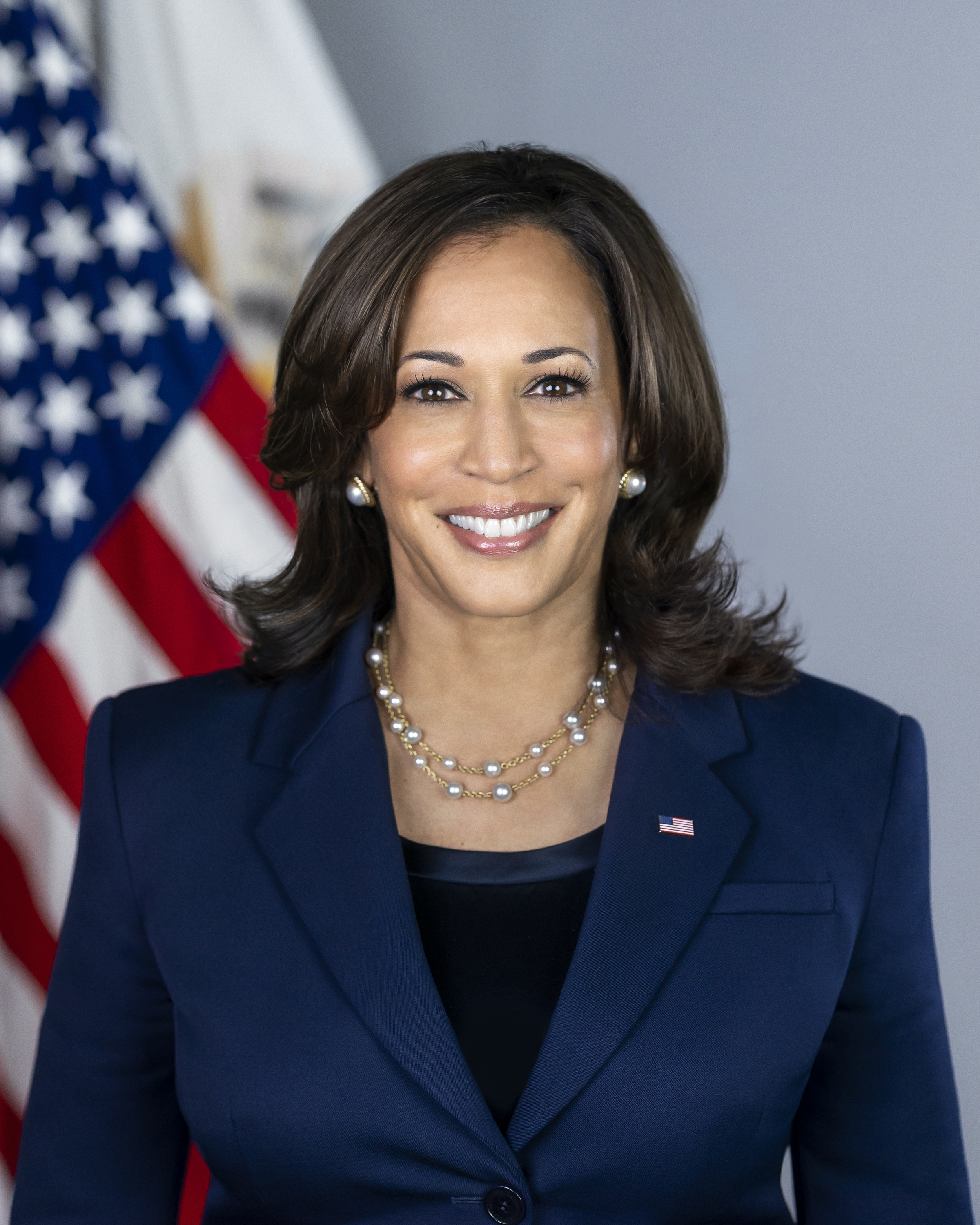
Official portrait of the 49th Vice President Kamala Harris, 2021

- Colleen Hanabusa, former Congresswoman from Hawaii
- Kamala Harris, 49th Vice President of the United States; former U.S. Senator from California and 32nd Attorney General of California
- Mazie Hirono, Senator from Hawaii
- Mike Honda, former Congressman from California

== I ==
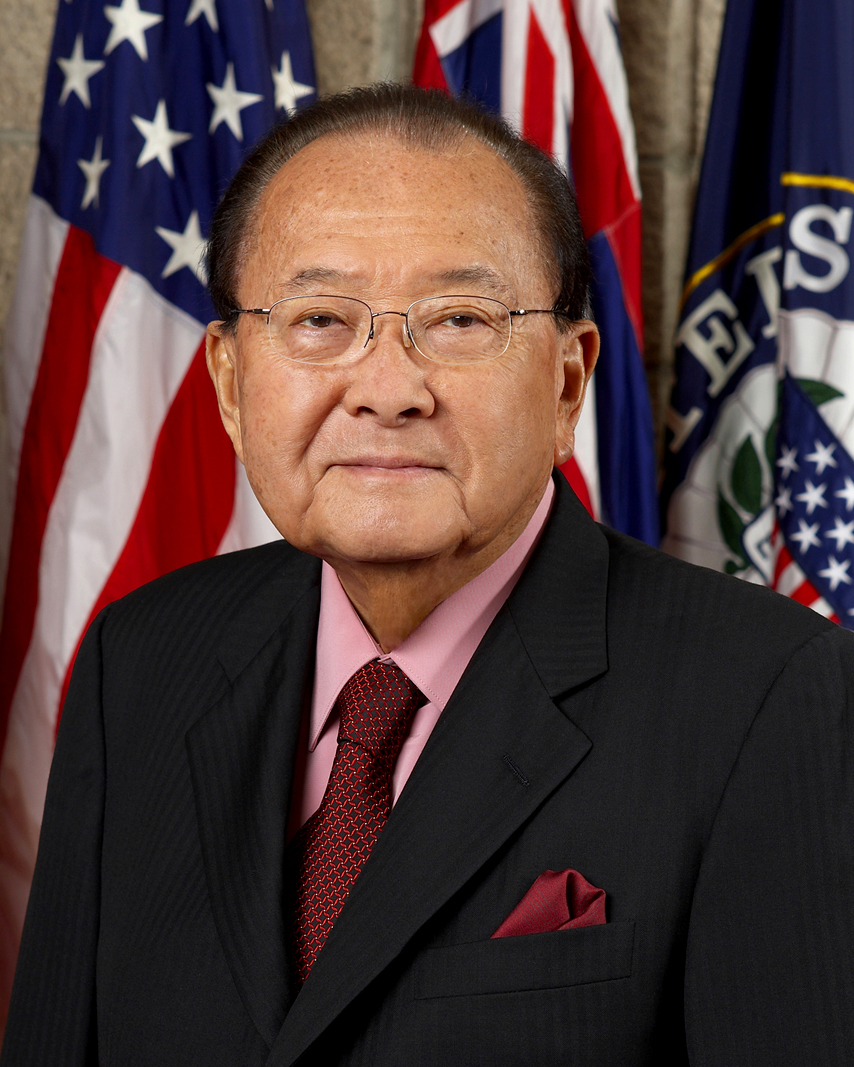
Daniel Inouye, former President pro tempore of the United States Senate

- David Ige, 8th Governor of Hawaii
- Daniel Inouye, former U.S. Senator from Hawaii

== J ==
- William Paul Jarrett, Congressional Delegate from Hawaii
- Pramila Jayapal, Congresswoman from Washington

== K ==
- Kai Kahele, former Congressman from Hawaii
- Ro Khanna, Congressman from California
- Andy Kim, Congressman from New Jersey
- Raja Krishnamoorthi, Congressman from Illinois

== L ==
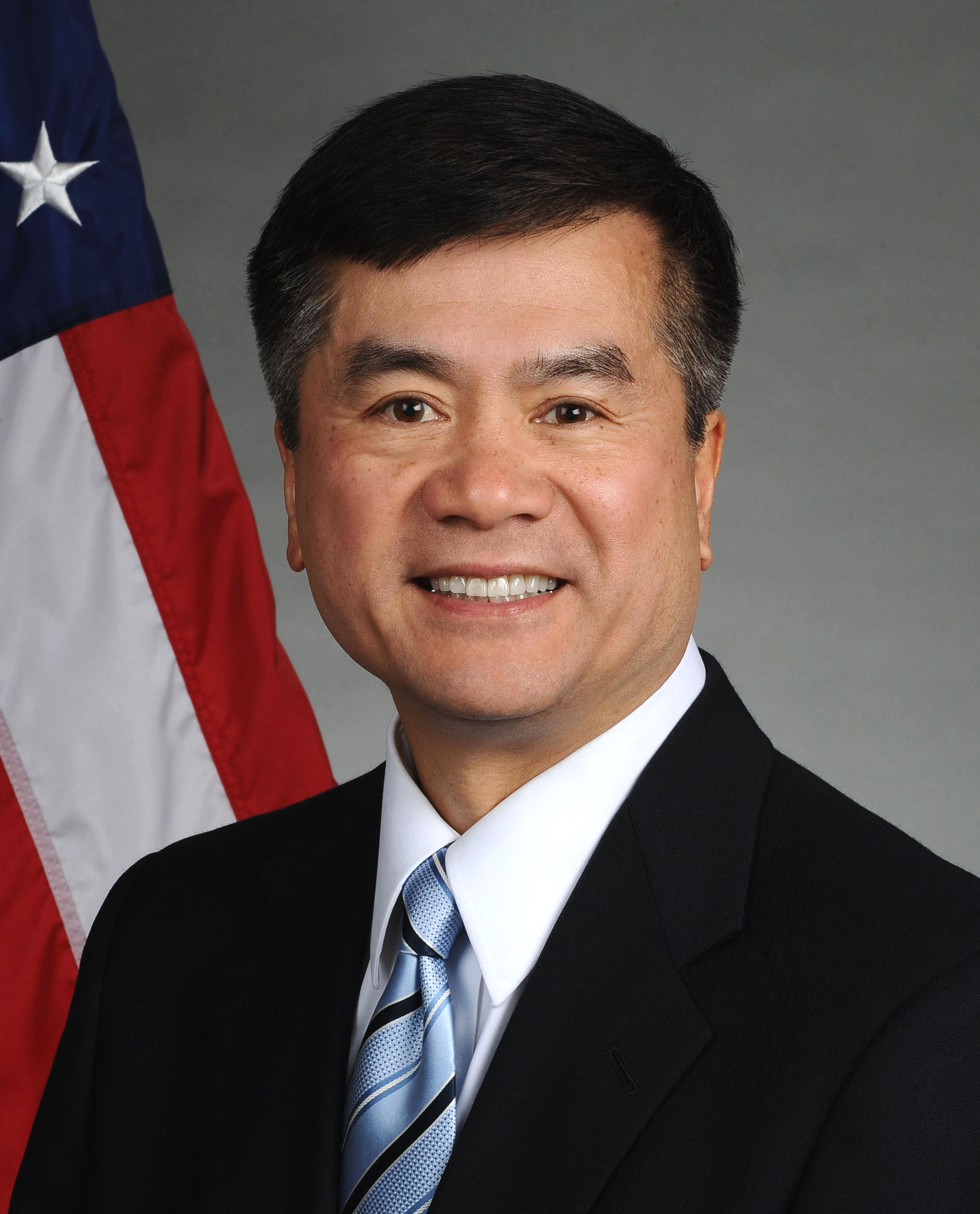
Gary Locke, former Governor of Washington

- Ed Lee, Mayor of San Francisco
- Ted Lieu, Congressman from California
- John Liu, former New York City Comptroller
- Gary Locke, 36th U.S. Secretary of Commerce and 21st Governor of Washington

== M ==
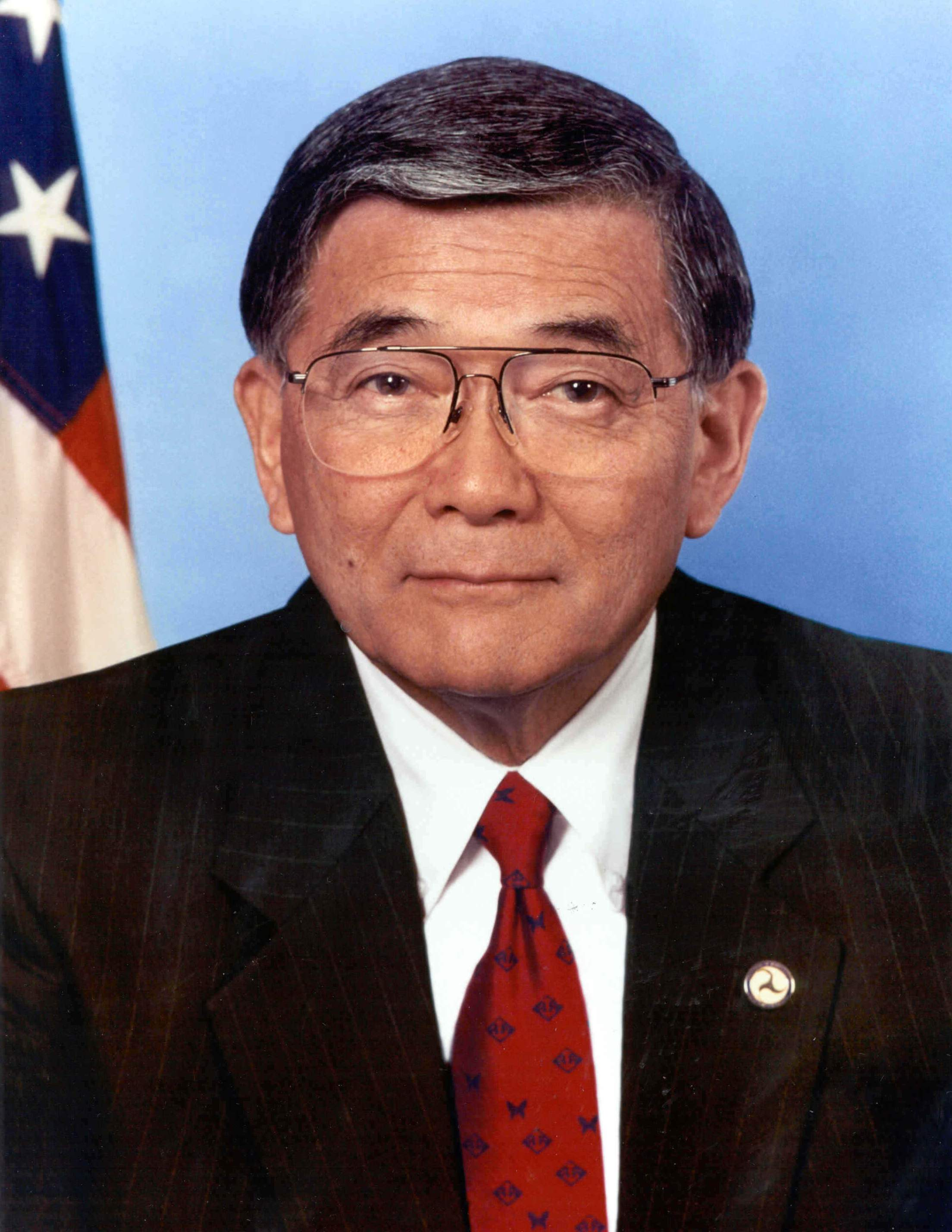
Norman Mineta, the first Asian-American Cabinet Secretary

- Bob Matsui, former Congressman from California
- Doris Matsui, Congresswoman from California
- Spark Matsunaga, former Senator from Hawaii
- Grace Meng, Congresswoman from New York
- Norman Mineta, former Congressman and former United States Secretary of Transportation
- Patsy Mink, former Congresswoman from Hawaii
- Stephanie Murphy, former Congresswoman from Florida

== O ==
- Pablo Ocampo, Resident Commissioner of the Philippines

== Q ==
- Jean Quan, Mayor of Oakland, California

== S ==
- Gregorio Sablan, Congressional Delegate from the Northern Mariana Islands
- Michael San Nicolas, former Congressional Delegate from Guam
- Dalip Singh Saund, former Congressman from California
- Bobby Scott, Congressman from Virginia
- Eric Shinseki, former United States Secretary of Veterans Affairs
- Kim Singh, former chair of Asia Pacific Caucus of the California Democratic Party
- Marilyn Strickland, Congresswoman from Washington and Mayor of Tacoma, Washington
- Fofō Iosefa Fiti Sunia, former Congressional Delegate from American Samoa

== T ==
- Mark Takai, former Congressman from Hawaii
- Mark Takano, Congressman from California
- Froilan Tenorio, 4th Governor of the Northern Mariana Islands
- Shri Thanedar, Congressman from Michigan
- Jill Tokuda, Congresswoman from Hawaii

== U ==
- Robert A. Underwood, former Congressional Delegate from Guam

== W ==
- John D. Waiheʻe III, 4th Governor of Hawaii
- Antonio Borja Won Pat, former Delegate from Guam
- Shien Biau Woo, former Lieutenant Governor of Delaware
- David Wu, former Congressman from Oregon

== See also ==
- Congressional Asian Pacific American Caucus
- List of Asian Americans
- Asian Pacific American
- List of Asian Pacific Americans in the United States Congress
- Asian Americans in government and politics
