= Marie Poulson =

American politician

Member of the Utah House of Representatives from the 46th district
- In office January 1, 2009 – January 1, 2021
- Preceded by: Karen Morgan
- Succeeded by: Gay Lynn Bennion

Personal details
- Born: Springville, Utah, U.S.
- Party: Democratic
- Education: Brigham Young University (BA)
- Profession: Teacher
- Website: mariepoulson.org

Marie H. Poulson (born in Springville, Utah) is an American politician who served as a member of the Utah House of Representatives from 2009 to 2021.

== Early life and education ==
Poulson was born and raised in Springville, Utah. She graduated from Springville High School and earned a Bachelor of Arts degree in English and history from Brigham Young University. After graduating from college, Poulson completed her teacher certification at BYU.

== Career ==
After teaching one year at Provo High School, she married Daniel Poulson in spring 1972 and moved with him to San Francisco, where he studied dentistry at the University of the Pacific Arthur A. Dugoni School of Dentistry. Upon graduation from dental school, the Poulsons moved to Northern Germany, where Dan served in the United States Army Dental Command.

In 1978, Poulson and her husband returned to Utah where he established a dental practice in Holladay and they purchased a home in Cottonwood Heights. Poulson has worked as a scout leader, school volunteer, and coach. She has participated in neighborhood groups to feed the homeless, organized can food drives for the Utah Food Bank, and made several trips to New Orleans to aid Hurricane Katrina victims.

In 1990, Poulson returned to the teaching profession, teaching English and history, first at Mount Jordan Middle School in Sandy, then Bingham High School in South Jordan, and finally at Riverton High School in Riverton. Poulson has taught in Utah public schools for a total of sixteen years.

=== Politics ===
During the 2016 General Legislative Session, Poulson served on the Public Education Appropriations Subcommittee, the House Education Committee, the House Ethics Committee, the Health Reform Task Force, and the House Political Subdivisions Committee. She is also part of the Veterans' and Military Affairs Commission.

In March 2020, Poulson announced that she would not seek re-election in November. She was succeeded by Gay Lynn Bennion.

== Elections ==
- 2014: Poulson was unopposed for the 2014 Democratic convention. She then won the November 4, 2014, General election in a three-person race against Republican nominee William Clayton and Libertarian Lee Anne Walker, with 6, 248 votes (54.1%).
- 2012: Poulson was unopposed for the June 26, 2012, Democratic primary and won the November 6, 2012, General election with 9,869 votes (54.6%) against Republican nominee Wyatt Christensen.
- 2010: Poulson was unopposed for the June 22, 2010, Democratic primary and won the November 2, 2010, General election with 6,075 votes (55.1%) against Republican nominee N. William Clayton.
- 2008: When District 46 Democratic Representative Karen Morgan ran for Utah State Senate and left the seat open, Poulson was chosen from two candidates by the Democratic convention for the three-way November 4, 2008, General election with 7,971 votes (54.4%) against Republican nominee Jaren Davis and Constitution candidate Katie Cameron.

== Personal life ==
For the last thirty-five years, Poulson and her husband have resided in the Cottonwood Heights, Utah. They have five children.
