= John Holladay =

American Mormon pioneer

John Holladay (March 10, 1798 – December 31, 1861) was an early settler and namesake of the settlement of Holladay's Burg, Utah Territory, which became Holladay, Utah. He and his family were early LDS pioneers in Colorado, Utah, and California.

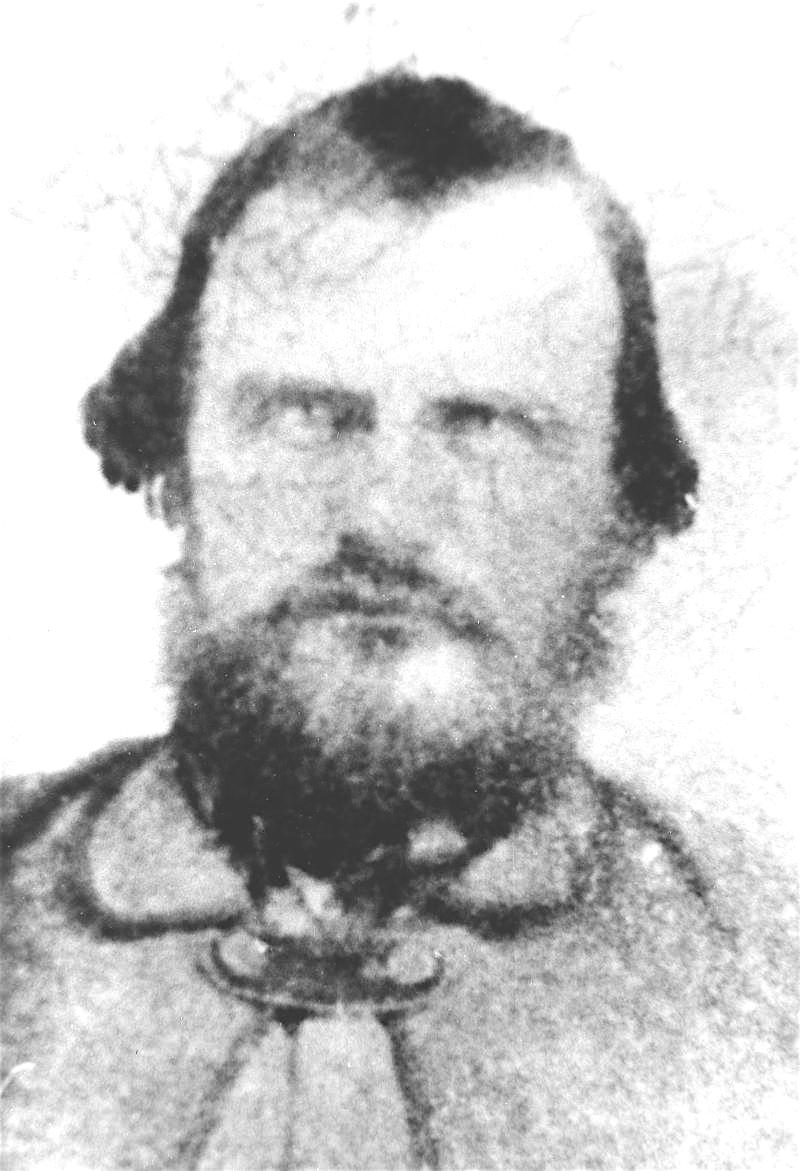
Portrait of John Holladay (1798-1861)

== Family ==
John Holladay was born in Camden District, Kershaw County, South Carolina. Some Utah descendants erroneously insist on calling him "John Daniel", though no credible evidence supports this. Historical records agree his given name was only "John".

Holladay married Catherine Beasley Higgins, also Camden born, in South Carolina in 1822. They had 10 children, nine of whom survived early childhood. Holladay's earliest known forebear in North America, his great-grandfather, is John "The Ranger" Holladay, whose name appears in Virginia records starting in 1702, and who owned a farm in what is now called Bumpass, Virginia. "The Ranger" was also an ancestor of the transportation businessman Ben Holladay and of gunfighter Doc Holliday.

After John "The Ranger" died in 1742, John Holladay's grandfather, Daniel Holladay, moved to South Carolina where his father, also Daniel, was born in 1752. Both Daniels were signers of the South Carolina Declaration of Independence, and Daniel the younger enlisted in 1775, as an orderly-sergeant in Col. William Moultrie's 2 South Carolina Regiment. He fought in the Battle of Sullivan's Island in 1776, and was discharged on April 6, 1778.

Following his father's death In 1826, the younger Daniel moved from South Carolina with his young family including son John, to join another son, William Daniel, at Moscow, Lamar County, Alabama. Daniel subsequently applied for and was adjudicated a Revolutionary War veteran pension and land grant in Alabama. He died on February 4, 1837, and is buried at Mulberry Cemetery in Moscow. One of John's sister Letitia married to John Hollis whose daughter, Susannah Fleming Hollis, married James Greer Bankhead the first of the Alabama Bankhead political dynasty.

== Mississippi Saints migration ==
In 1844, two missionaries from the Church of Jesus Christ of Latter-Day Saints traveled through Marion County, Alabama. These missionaries: Benjamin Franklin Mathews and William Crosby, taught the Holladay family the Gospel.

Around that time, John, Catherine, and several of their children were baptized into the LDS faith. In the spring of 1846, the family joined the so-called "Mississippi Saints" migration west under the leadership of John Brown. He left Alabama with his wife and eight of his nine living children and their respective families. Their expected destination was California. The Mississippi party was supposed to meet the main Mormon migration party led by Brigham Young on the road West. Young postponed the departure until the next year but they were not informed of this change. When the "Mississippi" group did not meet up with the main party after traveling as far as Ft. Laramie, they headed south to Pueblo, Colorado for the winter with the guidance of trapper/guide Jean Ricard. In Pueblo, the Mississippi Saints party set up a separate camp, including a log chapel, near the trapper settlement on the Arkansas River and prepared for winter. Holladay's eldest son John Daniel returned to Alabama before winter set in.

== Salt Lake City ==
In late spring 1847, on receiving word that main party was en route, they retraced their steps to Laramie thence to the Salt Lake City area, arriving on July 29, 1847. In Utah Territory, Holladay eventually settled his family and others of his group on Spring Creek, a tributary of Little Cottonwood Creek at a place which was called Holladay's Burg after him and which became the present-day town of Holladay, Utah.

In 1851, the Holladay family joined apostle Amasa Lyman's LDS Church-sanctioned purchase and colonization of Rancho San Bernardino, present-day San Bernardino, California. The family returned to Utah Territory in 1857 after Brigham Young precipitated the demise of the San Bernardino Colony, which he considered a threat to the Utah settlement project. The colonists had secured a mortgage collectively to purchase the Rancho San Bernardino. They were forced to default when it was almost paid off suffering heavy economic loss never compensated by the LDS Church. With the exodus their real estate became worthless. Some Holladays remained in the area and left the LDS Church.

Back in Utah, Holladay settled first at Beaver, Utah, then at Holladay Springs, near present-day Santaquin, Utah, where he remained until his death. He was buried in a field near the home where his wife was also buried when she died on April 19, 1877. Their grave markers were moved in 1960 to the Santaquin City Cemetery. The unmarked graves remain at the original burial place, which is now plowed under.
