= Gay Lynn Bennion =

American politician

Mayor of Cottonwood Heights, UT
- Incumbent
- Assumed office January 5, 2026
- Preceded by: Mike Weichers

Member of the Utah House of Representatives
- In office January 1, 2021 – December 5, 2025
- Preceded by: Marie Poulson
- Succeeded by: John Arthur
- Constituency: 46th district (2021–2023); 41st district (2023–2025)

Personal details
- Born: Salt Lake City, Utah, U.S.
- Party: Democratic
- Children: 4
- Education: Brigham Young University (BA)

Gay Lynn Bennion is an American politician currently serving as the mayor of Cottonwood Heights, Utah. In November 2020, she was elected as a member of the Utah House of Representatives from the 41st district, and she assumed office on January 1, 2021. In November 2025 she was elected as mayor of Cottonwood Heights, Utah, defeating incumbent Mayor Mike Weichers.

== Early life and education ==
Bennion was born in Salt Lake City and raised in Holladay, Utah. She earned a Bachelor of Arts degree in English from Brigham Young University.

== Career ==
Bennion has worked as a volunteer teacher. Since 2013, she has been the education director of the Women's State Legislative Council of Utah. She was elected to the Utah House of Representatives in November 2020, defeating Republican Jaren Davis with nearly 57% of the vote. She assumed office on January 1, 2021, succeeding Marie Poulson. She resigned from the chamber after being elected mayor of Cottonwood Heights.

== Personal life ==
After graduating from college, Bennion's husband, Jim, enlisted in the United States Air Force. The couple then moved to Washington, D.C., where Bennion worked at a mortgage firm while her husband attended medical school. Bennion's family lived in Oklahoma, Michigan, and Georgia before returning to Utah in 2012. Bennion and her husband have four children. She is a member of the Church of Jesus Christ of Latter-day Saints.
