= John Arthur (Utah politician) =

American politician

Member of the Utah House of Representatives from the 41st district
- Incumbent
- Assumed office December 8, 2025
- Preceded by: Gay Lynn Bennion

Personal details
- Party: Democratic
- Website: www.votejohnarthur.com

John Arthur is an American politician who has been a member of the Utah House of Representatives for the 41st district in 2025. He was appointed to replace Gay Lynn Bennion.

John Arthur taught sixth grade at Meadowlark Elementary in Salt Lake City. In 2024, he was a candidate for Utah State School Board District 7. He was the 2021 Utah Teacher of the Year and 2021 National Teacher of the Year finalist. Arthur has testified before the United States Senate Committee on Health, Education, Labor and Pensions.

He is Korean American.
