= James Kanno =

American politician

Mayor of Fountain Valley
- In office 1957–1962

Personal details
- Born: December 22, 1925 Orange County, U.S.
- Died: July 15, 2017 (aged 91) Santa Ana, California
- Known for: First mayor of Fountain Valley, California

James Jin Kanno (Japanese: 菅野 仁, December 22, 1925 – July 15, 2017) served as the first mayor of Fountain Valley, California from 1957 to 1962. He was one of the first mayors of Asian descent in the United States.

== Biography ==
Kanno was born in an unincorporated part of California's Orange County on December 22, 1925. His parents were immigrants from Japan's Fukushima Prefecture.

Kanno attended Santa Ana High School but, following the signing of Executive Order 9066, was sent with his family to the Poston War Relocation Center in Arizona during World War II before he could graduate. After leaving camp, Kanno attended Marquette University for a year before returning to California. In 1949, he graduated with a degree in mechanical engineering and minor in agricultural engineering from UCLA. That same year, Kanno and his father and brother purchased some acreage in the Fountain Valley area and began farming.

In the 1950s, Kanno served on a committee to incorporate what was then known as the Talbert area farmland into a new city. The push to incorporate was in response to developers who were buying farm land in the region. Kanno was a member of Orange County's Fountain Valley's inaugural city council and became its first mayor in 1957. As one of the country's first Asian American mayors, Kanno's election received some national attention including a positive writeup in U.S. News & World Report and an interview from Voice of America. Kanno served as Fountain Valley's mayor from 1957 to 1962, and helped in the establishment of the city's Mile Square Regional Park.

After leaving the Fountain Valley city council, Kanno served as chairman of the Historical and Cultural Foundation of Orange County's Japanese American Council and would speak about his internment camp experience at local schools.

Kanno died in Santa Ana, California in 2017 following a fall.
