= Holladay, Utah =

City in Utah, United States

- City
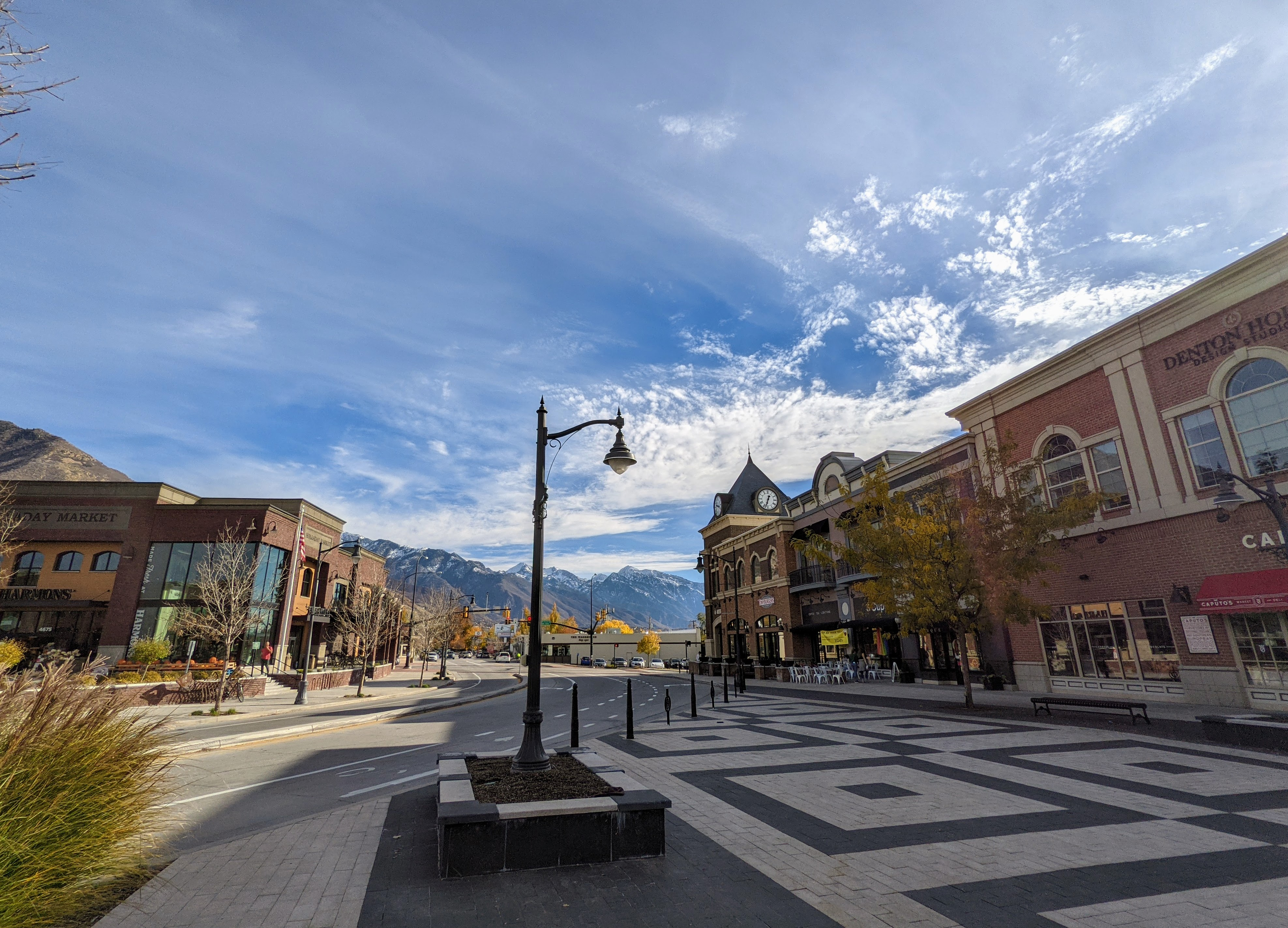
- Holladay Village (Downtown Holladay, Utah)

- Flag

- Location within Salt Lake County and the State of Utah.

- Location within Utah Location within the USA
- Coordinates: 40°39′23″N 111°49′10″W
- Country: United States
- State: Utah
- County: Salt Lake
- Settled: 1847
- Incorporated: November 29, 1999
- Founder: John Holladay

Government
  - Mayor: Robert M. Dahle
  - Councillor: Ty Brewer, Matt Durham, Paul Fotheringham, Drew Quinn, Dan Gibbons

Area
  - Total: 8.50 sq mi (22.02 km^{2})
  - Land: 8.50 sq mi (22.02 km^{2})
  - Water: 0 sq mi (0.00 km^{2})
- Elevation: 4,465 ft (1,361 m)

Population (2020)
  - Total: 31,965
  - Density: 3,760/sq mi (1,452/km^{2})
- Time zone: UTC−7 (Mountain (MST))
  - Summer (DST): UTC−6 (MDT)
- ZIP codes: 84117, 84121, 84124
- Area codes: 385, 801
- FIPS code: 49-36070
- GNIS feature ID: 1441810
- Website: www.holladayut.gov

Holladay is a city in central Salt Lake County, Utah, United States. It is part of the Salt Lake City, Utah Metropolitan Statistical Area and abuts the Wasatch National Forest. The population was 31,965 at the 2020 census, a significant increase from 14,561 in 2000 when the area first incorporated from Salt Lake County, this is due to the annexation of unincorporated land in 2002 and again in 2015. The city was incorporated on November 29, 1999. It was reported in the 1990 census as the Holladay-Cottonwood CDP.

== History ==
On July 29, 1847, a group of Mormon pioneers (members of the Church of Jesus Christ of Latter-day Saints) known as the Mississippi Company, among them John Holladay of Alabama, entered the Salt Lake Valley. Within weeks after their arrival, they discovered a free-flowing, spring-fed stream, which they called Spring Creek (near what is now Kentucky Avenue). While most of the group returned to the main settlement in Salt Lake City for the winter, two or three men built dugouts along this stream and wintered over. Thus, this became the first village established away from Salt Lake City itself. In the spring, a number of families hurried out to build homes and tame the land. There were numerous springs and ponds here, and grasses and wild flowers were abundant, making this a desirable area for settlement.

When John Holladay was named as the branch president of The Church of Jesus Christ of Latter-day Saints, the village took upon itself the name of Holladay's Settlement or Holladay's Burgh. John Holladay's family dates to the early 18th century in Virginia. His ancestors were signers of the South Carolina Declaration of Independence and fought in the Revolutionary War. He is a cousin to Ben Holladay, the Stagecoach King, who traded with the LDS and ran his Denver-San Francisco stage line through Salt Lake. It is not known if they were in contact. John and his father, Daniel, a Revolutionary War veteran, pioneered in Alabama before John's conversion to Mormonism. A year before the first LDS migration, in the spring of 1846, he departed west with his extended family, joining other converts that made up the Mississippi Company led by John Brown. They had been led to expect to meet the main party on the trail, but after going as far as Laramie without a sign of them, they went south and wintered at Pueblo, Colorado where they were later joined by the Mormon Battalion sick detachments. They had not gotten the word that Brigham Young's departure had been delayed by a year.

Holladay is the oldest continuously inhabited settlement in Utah, since Salt Lake City was abandoned for a time in 1857 when Johnston's Army occupied the city.

Cottonwood, a nearby settlement, was always associated with "Holladay's Burgh," and the area was first designated "Big Cottonwood," and later, as one of Salt Lake County's unincorporated communities, as "Holladay-Cottonwood".

Another center of settlement is the area settled in the mid-19th century by Rasmus Knudsen, now known as Knudsen's Corner. This area lies in the extreme southeastern corner of the city and is split with neighboring Cottonwood Heights.

In the 1960s, the Cottonwood Mall was constructed in Holladay, it being Utah's first enclosed shopping mall. The mall was closed down in 2007 after a plan to turn the mall into a European-style outdoor shopping village was announced.

The city was incorporated on November 29, 1999, as Holladay-Cottonwood, and the name was shortened to Holladay on December 14 of that year. Holladay City operated under the "strong mayor" form of government from 1999 until 2003, when the "council-manager" form was adopted. The mayors of Holladay have been Liane Stillman (1999 to 2001), Dennis Larkin (2001 to 2003), Dennis Webb (2003 to 2014) and Robert Dahle (2014 to present). The city's first manager was Randy Fitts (2003 to 2016). Known for its fine old homes and wooded lots, the controlling of commercial development and the preservation of open space have been the chief political issues in Holladay's recent history.

Holladay has experienced growth via four annexations, the most recent being in 2015. The bulk of Holladay's residential growth is due to these annexations. As Holladay shares borders with neighboring cities of Murray, City of Millcreek and Cottonwood Heights, the municipal boundaries are established.

== Demographics ==
=== 2020 census ===
As of the 2020 census, Holladay had a population of 31,965. The median age was 39.1 years. 24.7% of residents were under the age of 18 and 19.4% of residents were 65 years of age or older. For every 100 females there were 95.0 males, and for every 100 females age 18 and over there were 92.3 males age 18 and over.

100.0% of residents lived in urban areas, while 0.0% lived in rural areas.

There were 11,814 households in Holladay, of which 32.4% had children under the age of 18 living in them. Of all households, 55.9% were married-couple households, 14.7% were households with a male householder and no spouse or partner present, and 24.8% were households with a female householder and no spouse or partner present. About 24.3% of all households were made up of individuals and 12.6% had someone living alone who was 65 years of age or older.

There were 12,368 housing units, of which 4.5% were vacant. The homeowner vacancy rate was 1.0% and the rental vacancy rate was 6.0%.

Racial composition as of the 2020 census
Race	Number	Percent
White	27,954	87.5%
Black or African American	298	0.9%
American Indian and Alaska Native	108	0.3%
Asian	991	3.1%
Native Hawaiian and Other Pacific Islander	115	0.4%
Some other race	496	1.6%
Two or more races	2,003	6.3%
Hispanic or Latino (of any race)	1,805	5.6%

== Education ==
Since 1953 Holladay has been home to Olympus High School, which remains the only public high school within the city.

== Media ==
- The Cottonwood/Holladay City Journal, newspaper, tabloid style newspaper covering local government, schools, sports, and features.

== Notable people ==
- Duncan Spears Casper - pioneer
- Gay Lynn Bennion - American politician
- James LeVoy Sorenson - American businessman
- John Holladay - pioneer and founder of Holladay
- John Warnock - founder of Adobe Inc.
- Josh Romney
- Karl Rove - American political consultant and policy advisor
- Mitt Romney - American politician and businessman
- Paul W. Draper - anthropologist, magician, mentalist
- Ron McBride - football coach
- Sharlene Wells

== See also ==
- List of cities and towns in Utah
