= Karen Morgan =

American politician (born 1952)

Sen. Karen Morgan

Member of the Utah Senate from the 8th district
- In office 2009–2013
- Preceded by: Carlene M. Walker
- Succeeded by: Brian E. Shiozawa

Member of the Utah House of Representatives from the 46th district
- Succeeded by: Marie Poulson

Personal details
- Born: May 2, 1952 (age 74) Ogden, Utah
- Party: Democratic Party
- Spouse: S. Baird
- Education: University of Utah
- Profession: Educator

Karen W. Morgan (born May 2, 1952) is a Democratic politician from Utah. She was a member of the Utah State Senate representing the 8th District (portions of Salt Lake County) (map) from 2009 through 2013 and served as Minority Whip. Earlier (1998-2008) she was a member of the Utah House of Representatives from District 46.

In 2011 she founded the "Best Schools Coalition," which strives to make Utah's public education system the best in the nation. She is currently a Research Associate with the University of Utah Reading Clinic.

== Personal ==
She was born in Ogden, Utah and attended the University of Utah, graduating with a B.S. in secondary education. She and her husband Baird are the parents of five grown sons.
