= Cottonwood Mall (Utah) =

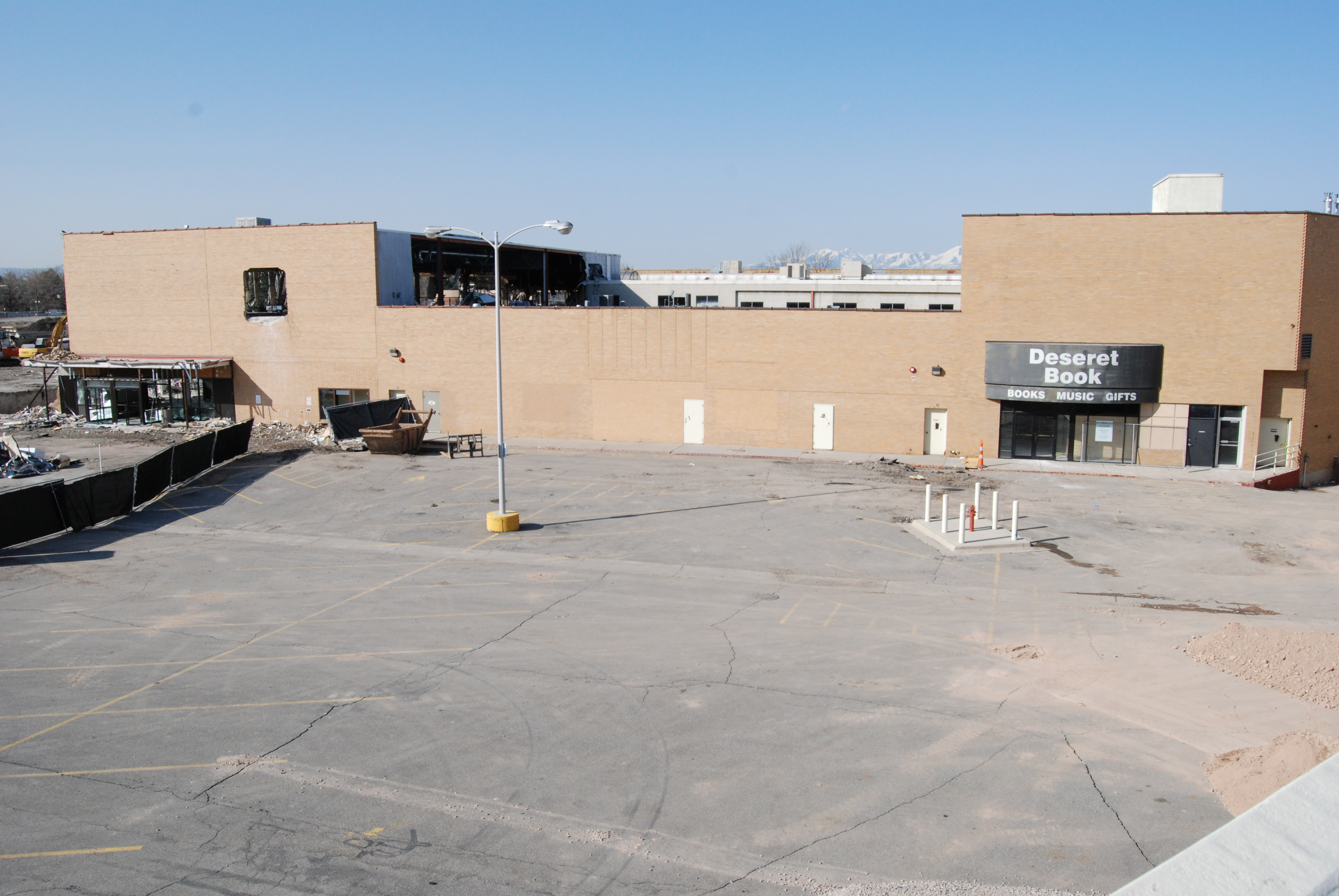
- Structure under demolition in 2008
- Location: Holladay, Utah, United States
- Coordinates: 40.663°N 111.837°W
- Address: 4835 Highland Drive
- Opened: 1962
- Demolished: 2008–2009
- Owner: The Howard Hughes Corporation
- Num. of anchor tenants: 1

Cottonwood Mall was an enclosed shopping mall in Holladay, Utah, a suburb of Salt Lake City, Utah, United States. It was the first large indoor shopping mall in the state. It was built and owned until 1985 by Horman construction (Sydney Horman Sr. CEO), when it was sold to John Price and Associates, then sold again later to General Growth Properties.

== History ==
The mall opened in 1962 with ZCMI, which became Meier & Frank in 2001 and Macy's in 2006. At the other end of the mall was a JCPenney. Other early tenants included an Albertsons supermarket and Woolworth, which was the last operational store in the state in 1993. The mall parking lot was used as a park and ride lot during the 2002 Winter Olympics.

Starting in the early 2000s, Cottonwood Mall suffered high vacancy rates. By 2004, the mall was approximately 25 percent vacant.

== Future ==
General Growth Properties first announced plans to redevelop the mall in July 2007. A month later, the Holladay city council deemed the shopping mall blighted. General Growth tore down the mall in mid-2008 as the beginning of redevelopment. Original redevelopment plans called for a lifestyle center to be built around the existing Macy's store.

A TGI Friday's restaurant in the parking lot closed in March 2009. Redevelopment of the mall halted in 2009 when General Growth Properties filed for bankruptcy.

GGP was reformed after the bankruptcy and split into two entities. The Howard Hughes Corporation, one of the entities, took over the redevelopment of the mall. In 2014, rumors surfaced that Smith's Food and Drug would be opening a location on the property with a tentative opening in late 2016.

In 2017, Macy's announced that they would be closing the store located on the Cottonwood Mall property as part of a plan to restructure their U.S. operations. There are still several businesses located nearby and the area is still known as the Cottonwood or Cottonwood Creekside area.

In 2020, a new mixed-use development named "Holladay Hills" was proposed for the former site of the Cottonwood Mall. Initially, it was planned to include a theater, retail spaces, restaurants, parking garages, multi-family residential, town homes, and single family homes. The first phase of the development, named "The Grandeur", was opened in October 2024. It includes apartments, condos, and several on-site amenities. Also announced was a flexible office space in part of the former Macy's store.
