= List of current United States lieutenant governors =

Party affiliation of current United States lieutenant governors: Democratic (21 states, 2 territories, and 1 district) Republican (24 states, 2 territories (Note: The Lieutenant governor in American Samoa is elected non-partisan; however, Pulu Ae Ae affiliates with the Republican Party)) Position nonexistent (5 states, 1 territory)

Party affiliation of current designated successors to the current United States governors: Democratic designated successor (24 states, 2 territories, and 1 district) Republican designated successor (26 states, 2 territories) New Progressive (Democratic affiliated) designated successor (1 territory)

Method for electing the lieutenant governor. Same ticket Same ticket in the general election, separate election in the primaries Separate election Title given to the leader of state senate Position nonexistent

The lieutenant governor is the second-highest-ranking government official in 45 of the 50 U.S. states and four of the five territories. In those states and territories, the lieutenant governor is the first in the line of succession in case of a vacancy in the office of governor (Note: in Massachusetts and West Virginia, the lieutenant governor only assumes powers and duties as acting governor, not succeeding to the governorship), while in the remaining states and territories another office holds that status. Currently, 26 states elect a lieutenant governor on a ticket with the governor, while 17 states elect a lieutenant governor separately. In West Virginia, the president of the Senate, as elected by the State Senators, serves as the state's lieutenant governor. In Tennessee, the State Senators elect a Speaker of the Senate, who in turn serves as lieutenant governor. Five states and one inhabited territory do not have a lieutenant governor.

== List of lieutenant governors by state ==
In the table below, "term ends" indicates the year the current lieutenant governor will leave office; a notation (term limits) after the year indicates that the current lieutenant governor is ineligible to seek re-election in that year. A notation of (retiring) after the year indicates that the current lieutenant governor is leaving office that year, having not sought re-election. A notation of (defeated) indicates that the current lieutenant governor was defeated for re-election.

State	Image	Name	Party	Prior Public Experience	Term Start	Term End	Selection
Alabama (list)		Will Ainsworth	Republican	Alabama House	January 14, 2019	2027	Separate election
Alaska (list)		Nancy Dahlstrom	Republican	Commissioner of Alaska Department of Corrections; Alaska House	December 5, 2022	2026	Same ticket
Arkansas (list)		Leslie Rutledge	Republican	Attorney General	January 10, 2023	2027	Separate election
California (list)		Eleni Kounalakis	Democratic	U.S. Ambassador to Hungary	January 7, 2019	2027 (term limits)	Separate election
Colorado (list)		Dianne Primavera	Democratic	Colorado House	January 8, 2019	2027	Same ticket
Connecticut (list)		Susan Bysiewicz	Democratic	Secretary of the State of Connecticut; Connecticut House	January 9, 2019	2027	Same ticket in the general elections; Separate elections in the primaries
Delaware (list)		Kyle Evans Gay	Democratic	Delaware Senate	January 21, 2025	2029	Separate election
Florida (list)		Jay Collins	Republican	Florida Senate	August 12, 2025	2027	Same ticket
Georgia (list)		Burt Jones	Republican	Georgia Senate	January 9, 2023	2027	Separate election
Hawaii (list)		Sylvia Luke (Note: On leave due to campaign finance scandals. Keith Regan, state comptroller, is serving as acting lieutenant governor during Luke's leave.)	Democratic	Hawaii House	December 5, 2022	2026	Same ticket in the general elections; Separate elections in the primaries
Idaho (list)		Scott Bedke	Republican	Idaho House Speaker	January 2, 2023	2027	Separate election
Illinois (list)		Juliana Stratton	Democratic	Illinois House	January 14, 2019	2027	Same ticket
Indiana (list)		Micah Beckwith	Republican	Noblesville public library trustee	January 13, 2025	2029	Same ticket in the general elections; Separately nominated at party conventions
Iowa (list)		Chris Cournoyer	Republican	Iowa Senate	December 16, 2024	2027	Same ticket
Kansas (list)		David Toland	Democratic	State Secretary of Commerce	January 2, 2021	2027	Same ticket
Kentucky (list)		Jacqueline Coleman	Democratic	No prior offices	December 10, 2019	2027 (term limits)	Same ticket
Louisiana (list)		Billy Nungesser	Republican	Plaquemines Parish President	January 11, 2016	2028	Separate election
Maryland (list)		Aruna Miller	Democratic	Maryland House of Delegates	January 18, 2023	2027	Same ticket
Massachusetts (list)		Kim Driscoll	Democratic	Mayor of Salem	January 5, 2023	2027	Same ticket in the general elections; Separate elections in the primaries
Michigan (list)		Garlin Gilchrist	Democratic	No prior offices	January 1, 2019	2027 (term limits)	Same ticket
Minnesota (list)		Peggy Flanagan	Democratic (DFL)	Minnesota House	January 7, 2019	2027	Same ticket
Mississippi (list)		Delbert Hosemann	Republican	Mississippi Secretary of State	January 14, 2020	2028 (term limits)	Separate election
Missouri (list)		David Wasinger	Republican	No prior offices	January 13, 2025	2029	Separate election
Montana (list)		Kristen Juras	Republican	No prior offices	January 4, 2021	2029	Same ticket
Nebraska (list)		Joe Kelly	Republican	United States Attorney for the District of Nebraska	January 5, 2023	2027	Same ticket
Nevada (list)		Stavros Anthony	Republican	Las Vegas City Council	January 2, 2023	2027	Separate election
New Jersey (list)		Shirley Emehelu	Democratic		November 9, 2026	2030	Same ticket
New Mexico (list)		Howie Morales	Democratic	New Mexico Senate; Grant County Clerk	January 1, 2019	2027	Same ticket in the general elections; Separate elections in the primaries
New York (list)		Antonio Delgado	Democratic	U.S. House	May 25, 2022	2026	Same ticket in the general elections; Separate elections in the primaries
North Carolina (list)		Rachel Hunt	Democratic	North Carolina Senate; North Carolina House	January 1, 2025	2029	Separate election
North Dakota (list)		Michelle Strinden	Republican	North Dakota House	December 15, 2024	2028	Same ticket
Ohio (list)		Jim Tressel	Republican	No prior offices	February 14, 2025	2027	Same ticket
Oklahoma (list)		Matt Pinnell	Republican	No prior offices	January 14, 2019	2027	Separate election
Pennsylvania (list)		Austin Davis	Democratic	Pennsylvania House	January 17, 2023	2027	Same ticket in the general elections; Separate elections in the primaries
Rhode Island (list)		Sabina Matos	Democratic	Providence City Council	April 14, 2021	2027	Separate election
South Carolina (list)		Pamela Evette	Republican	No prior offices	January 9, 2019	2027	Same ticket
South Dakota (list)		Tony Venhuizen	Republican	South Dakota House	January 30, 2025	2027	Same ticket
Tennessee (list)		Randy McNally	Republican	Tennessee Senate; Tennessee House	January 10, 2017	2027	State Senate
Texas (list)		Dan Patrick	Republican	Texas Senate	January 20, 2015	2027	Separate election
Utah (list)		Deidre Henderson	Republican	Utah Senate	January 4, 2021	2029	Same ticket
Vermont (list)		John S. Rodgers	Republican	Vermont Senate; Vermont House	January 9, 2025	2027	Separate election
Virginia (list)		Ghazala Hashmi	Democratic	Virginia Senate	January 17, 2026	2030	Separate election
Washington (list)		Denny Heck	Democratic	U.S. House; Washington House	January 13, 2021	2029	Separate election
West Virginia (list)		Randy Smith	Republican	West Virginia House; West Virginia Senate	January 8, 2025	2027	State Senate
Wisconsin (list)		Sara Rodriguez	Democratic	Wisconsin State Assembly	January 3, 2023	2027	Same ticket in the general elections; Separate elections in the primaries

== List of lieutenant governors by territory ==
Territory	Image	Lieutenant governor	Party	Prior public experience	Term start	Term end	Chosen by
American Samoa (list)		Pulu Ae Ae Jr.	Republican	American Samoa; House of Representatives	January 3, 2025	2029	Same ticket
Guam (list)		Josh Tenorio	Democratic	No prior offices	January 7, 2019	2027	Same ticket
Northern Mariana Islands (list)		Dennis Mendiola	Republican	Northern Mariana Islands Senate	July 23, 2025	2027	Same ticket
U.S. Virgin Islands (list)		Tregenza Roach	Democratic	Legislature of the Virgin Islands	January 7, 2019	2027	Same ticket

== States which do not have lieutenant governors ==
Five states do not have a position of an official lieutenant governor. In these cases, the secretary of state or the president of the Senate is first in line for the governorship.

State	Office	Image	Officeholder	Party	Prior public experience	Term start
Arizona (Note: Proposition 131 passed in the 2022 election, which will create the office of Arizona Lieutenant Governor following the 2026 election.)	Secretary of State		Adrian Fontes	Democratic	County Recorder of Maricopa County	January 2, 2023
Maine	President of the Senate		Mattie Daughtry	Democratic	Maine Senate; Maine House of Representatives	December 4, 2024
New Hampshire	President of the Senate		Sharon Carson	Republican	New Hampshire Senate; New Hampshire House of Representatives	December 4, 2024
Oregon	Secretary of State		Tobias Read	Democratic	Oregon Treasurer; Oregon House	January 6, 2025
Wyoming	Secretary of State		Chuck Gray	Republican	Wyoming House of Representatives	January 2, 2023

== Federal district and territories which do not have lieutenant governors or deputy mayors ==
One territory, Puerto Rico, places the secretary of state first in line for the governorship. In the District of Columbia, the chairman of the Council of the District of Columbia is first in line of succession in the event of a vacancy in the office of mayor of the District of Columbia.

Jurisdiction	Office	Image	Officeholder	Party	Prior public experience	Term start
District of Columbia	Chairman of the Council		Phil Mendelson	Democratic	DC Councilman; Advisory Neighborhood Commissioner	June 13, 2012
Puerto Rico	Secretary of State		Rosachely Rivera	New Progressive/ Democratic	Mayor of Gurabo	July 3, 2025

== States and territories with differing party membership at the executive level ==
In most states or territories, the governor and lieutenant governor are members of the same political party. In the following states and territories, the designated successor to the governorship is of a different political party than the governor:

State or territory	Governor	Designated successor
Northern Mariana Islands	Independent	Republican
Puerto Rico (Note: While Jenniffer González and Rosachely Rivera have different federal party affiliations, they are both members of Puerto Rico's New Progressive Party.)	Republican	Democratic

== See also ==
- List of current United States first spouses
- List of current United States governors
- List of current United States lieutenant governors by age
- List of female lieutenant governors in the United States
- List of minority governors and lieutenant governors in the United States
