= Ka Leo O Hawaiʻi =

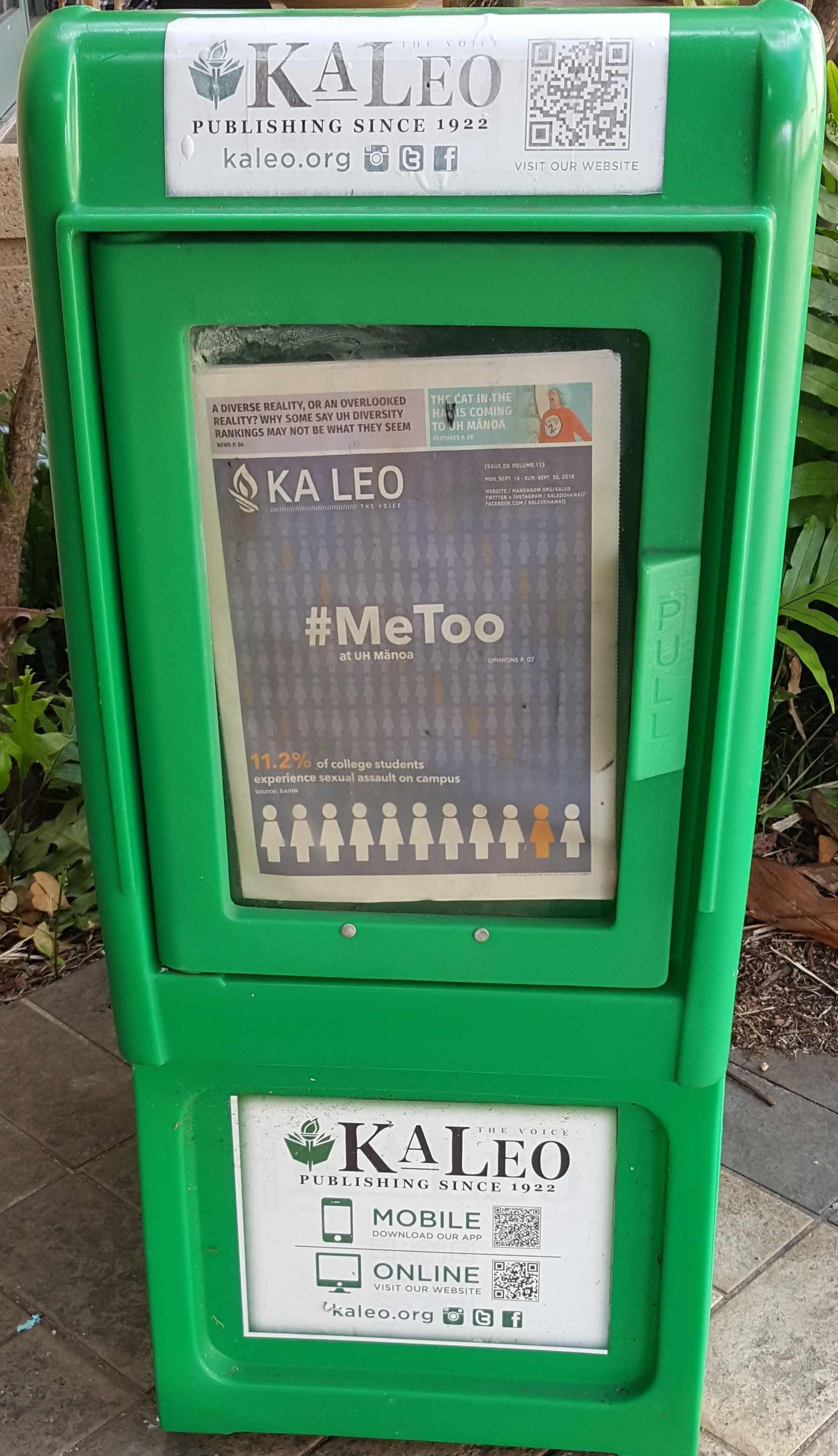
- Type: Student newspaper
- Format: Tabloid
- School: University of Hawaiʻi at Mānoa
- Founded: 1922
- Headquarters: 2445 Campus Road, Hemenway 107, Honolulu, Hawai'i 96822
- Circulation: 10,000
- Website: www.kaleo.org

Ka Leo O Hawaiʻi (The Voice of Hawaiʻi) is the student newspaper at the University of Hawaiʻi at Mānoa.

The newspaper is published by the University of Hawaii at Manoa Board of Publications (BOP), a Board of Regents Chartered Student Organization founded in 1966. Previous to the founding of the BOP, Ka Leo was published by a committee of the Associated Students of the University of Hawaii.

== History ==
The newspaper started in 1922. Beginning in the fall of 2010, Ka Leo began printing every Monday, Wednesday and Friday during the fall and spring semesters, and only Wednesday during the summer semester. Previously Ka Leo had printed on Mondays, Wednesdays and Thursdays. As of 2016, the newspaper publishes biweekly, releasing every other Monday, in an effort to focus on web oriented content. Each issue ranges from 12 to 80 pages and is printed in a tabloid format. Circulation is 10,000, distributed to over 100 locations on campus and in the community.

An exhibition was held in Hamilton Library for the 90th anniversary of the newspaper. It covered the most controversial stories of the Ka Leo's history, such as professor Haunani-Kay Trask and student Joey Carter's fervent discussion of the word "haole" and its contested meaning.

== Mission ==
Ka Leo O Hawai'i seeks to foster informed involvement throughout the University of Hawaiʻi community. As the official newspaper of the University of Hawaiʻi, Ka Leo endeavors to become a cornerstone of intellectual exchange on campus. Ka Leo continually strives to be inclusive and balanced in our reporting, while sustaining the values of journalistic integrity and reliability.
