= Associated Students of the University of Hawaii =

Student government

Associated Students of the University of Hawaiʻi
- Motto: Pupukahi i holomua (Hawaiian)
- Motto in English: Unite to move forward
- Established: 1912
- Website: Associated Students of the University of Hawaiʻi

The Associated Students of the University of Hawaiʻi at Mānoa (ASUH) is the undergraduate student government representing the 10,000+ full-time, classified, undergraduate students at the University of Hawaiʻi at Mānoa. ASUH was chartered by the University of Hawaiʻi Board of Regents in 1912 and was originally named the Associated Students of the College of Hawai'i.

== Background ==
=== Budget ===
The student government manages a stock portfolio currently worth around $9.0 million, of which up to 5 percent is withdrawn annually to fund the senate's yearly budget. The student government money originally came from the 1975 sale of the Honolulu Stadium, and has been managed by students since 1980 when ASUH received $836,000 from the sale to invest and create a fund for student projects.

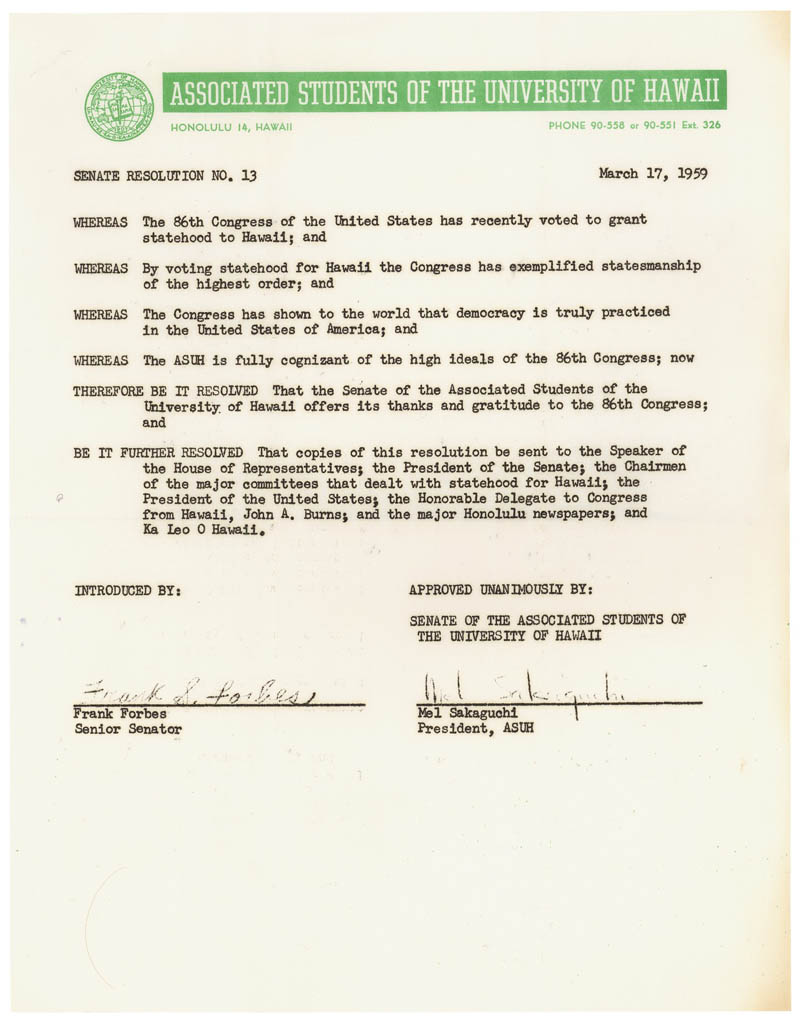
ASUH was very active in promoting Hawaiian statehood. A senate resolution from 1959 sent to Congress.

=== Office ===
The ASUH office is currently located in Campus Center 211. Before the construction of the Campus Center, the ASUH office was located in Hemenway Hall along with the University's cafeteria, mail room, and bookstore.

=== Structure ===
ASUH is based on the parliamentary system and the executive and legislative branches are combined into one general assembly (the ASUH senate). The President and Vice president are popularly elected by the student body and the President presides over the senate. The President appoints committee chairs with the approval of the ASUH senate. The executive members of the senate consist of the President, Vice-President, Secretary, Treasurer, and the four Senator at Large positions. In addition to the executive officers, 30 senators representing various colleges of the university make up the senate. The number of senators per college varies according to the population of the college, like the United States House of Representatives.

The Student Court, which is appointed by the President and confirmed by the Senate, consists of 7 members. The Court has final jurisdiction in all matters pertaining to the ASUH Constitution and By-Laws and in all cases resulting from ASUH senate legislation.

=== Elections ===
ASUH elections are held three times a year. The General Election takes place once a year during the Spring semester in April. During the General Election, all seats are open for election. Special Elections may take place during the Fall and Spring semesters to fill any vacancies that occur in the senate throughout the year. All senate members serve one year terms. Elections take place online at each University of Hawaiʻi students' MyUH account to ensure a fair election.

== Positions ==
=== Executive committee ===
The Executive Committee is composed of the ASUH Executive Officers (President, Vice President, Secretary, Treasurer), the Standing Committee Chairpersons, and Senators-At-Large. This committee coordinates the administration of all ASUH Senate programs, services and activities, hears Senate measures for First reading, hears complaints made against Senators or Executive Officers and decide the appropriate course of action, and responds to matters of immediate concern when the General Senate is not or is unable to be in session.

President The ASUH President is the chief executive officer of the Associated Students of the University of Hawaiʻi at Mānoa and serves a one-year term (academic year). The ASUH President presides over the General Senate and Executive Committee, and its meetings. They represent ASUH in all official dealings with the University Administration, the faculty, and other organizations, firms, and persons, and is responsible for the general welfare of the ASUH. The current President of the 109th Senate is Joshua Jungha Kim.

Vice President The ASUH Vice President assists the President in all Presidential duties, and exercises all Presidential powers and duties in the case of a vacancy, absence or incapacity in the office of the President. The ASUH Vice President is in charge of coordinating the activities of all ASUH standing committees and act as a liaison between the Senate and the standing committees. The current Vice-President of the 109th Senate is Alyssa Renteria.

Secretary The ASUH Secretary maintains accurate and complete files of the minutes of all General Senate and Executive Committee meetings, as well as upkeeps the records of all committee meeting minutes. The Secretary maintains attendance, voting records, and codifies all Senate legislation. They perform duties as assigned by the President or the Senate. The 110th Senate Secretary is Min Ji Cha.

Treasurer The ASUH Treasurer, along with the Committee on Finance, drafts and introduces the ASUH Budget each fiscal year. The Treasurer publicizes and submits financial reports to the ASUH. They perform duties assigned by the President or the ASUH Senate. The current Treasurer role for the 110th senate remains vacant.

Senator at Large

=== Senate Positions ===
Senator for the College of Arts and Sciences

Senator for the College of Engineering

Senator for the College of Health Sciences & Social Welfare

Senator for the College of Tropical Agriculture and Human Resources

Senator for the Hawai’inuiākea School of Hawaiian Knowledge

Senator for the Shidler College of Business

Senator for the School of Architecture

Senator for the School of Ocean and Earth Science and Technology

Senator for the School of Pacific and Asian Studies

Senator for the School of Travel Industry Management

== Standing committees ==
=== Current standing committees ===
The Senate currently has eight standing committees: the Campus Life committee, the Elections committee, the External Affairs committee, Finance committee, Investment and Long Range Planning committee, the Internal Affairs Committee, Student Affairs committee, and Undergraduate Academic Affairs. Each committee is overseen by a chair and vice-chair and each person on senate is required to be a member of two committees.

Current chairs

- 109th Senate
  - Campus Life - Miriam Salameh (Fall 2021) / Tea Stephens (Spring 2022)
  - External Affairs - Mālamalono Hokama-Paris
  - Elections - Christian Hermoso
  - Internal Affairs - Tina Loos
  - Finance - Julia Anuszewska
  - Investments and Long Range Planning - Blake Saari
  - Student Affairs - Hayden Kasal-Barsky
  - Undergraduate Academic Affairs - Alyssa Renteria (Fall 2021) / Mitchell Dai (Spring 2022)

=== Former standing committees ===
==== KTUH: 1966–1982 ====
KTUH, the student run radio station at the University of Hawaiʻi at Mānoa, began as a standing committee of ASUH in 1966. KTUH was an AM closed circuit operation and reached the residence halls. ASUH oversaw the funding and operations of KTUH for its first three years. On September 28, 1967, ASUH passed a resolution asking UH President Thomas Hamilton to apply for an FM educational license. In December 1968, under the sponsorship of ASUH Senator Ken Kuniyuki, ASUH passed another resolution petitioning the Board of Regents to apply for an FM educational license. On January 8, 1969, the Board of Regents authorized the administration to file for a 10 watt FM radio station.

KTUH was issued its first educational FM license on September 29, 1969. The Speech-Communications Department obtained administrative control and line funding of KTUH after it became an FM station while ASUH continued to publish the station's program guides as a quasi-stipulation of the Board of Regents at the time of the transfer. In 1977, KTUH was overseen by the Director of the Bureau of Student Activities and developed as a student organization similar in design and intent to other previously chartered organizations. KTUH became a Chartered Student Organization on April 6, 1982, after a proposal was made to the Chancellor recommending that KTUH became a chartered organization. It was chartered under the organization name, Broadcast Communication Authority (BCA).

==== Board of Publications: 1966 ====
On June 11, 1966, the University of Hawai'i Board of Regents approved the reorganization and subsequent separation of the Board of Publications (BOP) from ASUH as a BOR Chartered Student Organization.

== History of advocacy and legislation ==
=== ‘Ōlelo Hawai‘i Initiative: 2019-20 ===
The purpose of the ‘Ōlelo Hawai‘i Initiative is to provide an opportunity and space for UHM students and community members to learn and speak the Hawaiian language at a centralized location on the Mānoa Campus.

=== U-PASS Initiative: 2008 – present ===
In order to help reduce traffic, combat the low availability of student parking, and decrease the cost of bus passes, issues which were affecting a large number of students, in 2008 ASUH proposed a mandatory $20 student fee that would grant all fee paying students a bus pass (U-PASS) for the entire semester. At that time, the U-PASS was an optional $100 per semester a student could choose to pay if they wanted a bus pass. Henry Cheng (97th senate), an ASUH senator who led the U-PASS initiative with ASUH Secretary Kiara Sakamoto (97th senate), said, "TheBus is hoping that the mandatory university wide U-Pass will encourage more students to ride the bus, which will help the company when it applies for federal funding."

The proposal had support from both students and public transit authorities. ASUH collected over 2,200 signatures from the student body supporting the U-PASS initiative, over 604 pieces of written testimony at University of Hawaiʻi at Mānoa libraries (77% in support), and over 1,500 online testimonies from an online U-PASS survey (90% in support). In addition, resolutions of support were passed by: the UH System Student Caucus, Sustainable Saunders, Manoa Neighborhood Board, McCully/Moili'ili Neighborhood Board, and the Honolulu City Council Committee on Transportation & Planning.

ASUH proposed the student fee to the University of Hawaiʻi Board of Regents on March 20, 2009. The U-PASS initiative was approved unanimously with no reservations for a 2-year pilot program. The U-PASS program began in Spring 2010 and will conclude in Fall 2011. ASUH will need to meet with the Board of Regents again if they wish to continue the U-PASS pilot program as a permanent program.

=== Campus Center Renovation and Fitness Center Construction: 2007 ===
This project was a collaborative effort between the Associated Students of the University of Hawaii (ASUH) and the Campus Center Board (CCB). Both groups successfully worked with university, community, governmental and legislative stakeholders in order to successfully appropriate $38 million in revenue bonds to renovate existing campus center complex facilities and construct a state-of-the-art 64,000 sq. ft. fitness center exclusively for the general student population. "If the building has to be placed on the outskirts of campus, that raises some problems," said Grant Teichman, the incoming president of the Campus Center Board. "The reason why that site was picked was for safety and security reasons," he said, noting that since there is a lot of foot traffic, students will not have to walk alone to and from the site.

=== 24-hour Sinclair Library and Student Services Funding: 2006 ===
"The project was a priority to more than 1,000 students who sent testimony to the Legislature in February asking for the funding to keep the library open longer," said Grant Teichman, the president of the undergraduate student association at University of Hawaiʻi at Mānoa. Students and student leaders also successfully led efforts to triple the amount of undergraduate academic advisors after submitting hundreds of pieces of testimony in support of robust funding to address desperately needed advising positions. In 2006, an emergency hold off on non-emergency advising was issued during the first two weeks of the semester due to a staff shortage with over 100 students a day being turned away. Before funding, there were only five (5) full-time and one part-time advisors serving more than 10,000 Arts and Sciences students at a ratio of 1:1,500—the recommended ratio, according to the National Academic Advising Association, is 1:300.

=== Preservation of Alcohol Sales at Aloha Stadium: 2006 ===
In 2006, ASUH successfully led the effort against Lieutenant Governor Duke Aiona in order to preserve alcohol sales at Aloha Stadium. The ASUH Senate voted unanimously to oppose the proposed alcohol ban in both the Aloha Stadium parking lot and seating areas. ASUH was the only major Hawaii organization to oppose the ban.

Grant Teichman, a junior at the university and president of the student association, said the ban would infringe on the rights of those who can legally drink."It's pretty clear across the nation that banning alcohol doesn't stop the problem," said Teichman, noting that the student association represents 13,000 undergraduate students, of which half are age 21 or older. "Let's pick the best solution and not the fastest one."

ESPN further reported, "It's really going to hurt the students who just want to go out there and have a good time," said Teichman, noting that 40 student senators representing all university programs have unanimously voted against the ban." It will dramatically affect tailgating, one of the few traditions that our students have," he said.

=== Honolulu High-Capacity Transit Corridor Project: 2006 ===
In 2006, ASUH began a high-profile advocacy initiative in support of the Honolulu High-Capacity Transit Corridor Project. ASUH first backed Honolulu Mayor Mufi Hannemann in his effort to obtain federal funding for a mass transit solution for the City and County of Honolulu. Mayor Hannemann later lost ASUH support after his decision to remove the University of Hawaiʻi at Mānoa campus from the proposed initial operating 21-mile segment of rail. "If it doesn't go to UH-Manoa, this isn't a traffic solution," said Grant Teichman, UH student president. "I think it's been very misleading to the public calling it 'Honolulu on the Move--A Mass Transit Solution.' This is not a mass transit solution."

=== Frear Hall Renovation Financing and Student Housing Services Audit: 2005-Present ===
In 2005, ASUH worked in concert with University administrators in order to successfully advocate for $100 million in revenue bonds and $25 million general obligation bonds enacted by H.B. 19 passed by the 2005 Hawaii State Legislature and signed into law by Gov. Linda Lingle. ASUH organized a media blitz around the creation of a tent city in order to demonstrate students would rather live on Bachman Lawn than in squalor at the dilapidated student housing facilities. While construction on the new Frear Hall was completed in 2008, it has already fallen into disrepair due to many of the same management issues plaguing UH student housing for decades.

ASUH also spearheaded a comprehensive management audit for University of Hawaii Student Housing Services enacted by S.C.R. 97 passed into law by the 2006 Hawaii State Legislature. The audit was then conducted by State Auditor Marion Higa. ASUH requested the audit after numerous reports of sexual harassment, embezzlement, waste, fraud, abuse and other alleged illegal activities by student housing employees were reported. ASUH attempted a mailing to students about their constitutional rights, but University administrators initially blocked its disbursement through the University mail system. Despite strong findings by the state legislature and state auditor, as of 2016, students again report they live in squalor in poorly maintained student housing facilities.

=== ASUH Student Shuttle Service: 1991 ===
The ASUH recognized that the lack of parking stalls on the University of Hawaiʻi at Mānoa campus was a great concern to undergraduates. In order to alleviate the parking shortage, ASUH Senator Paul Isono created a pilot shuttle program in the fall of 1990. Upon refinement of this program, an ASUH student shuttle service—running between Mānoa valley and the campus—would be implemented in the Spring of 1991, free of charge to ASUH members.

=== University of Hawai'i Student Caucus: 1990 ===
In 1990, Ross Kamakahi Jr., president of the Associated Students of Leeward Community College, and Keith Kamisugi, president of ASUH-Manoa, worked with a team of students from each campus of the system to create a coalition of student governments. Through several organizing meetings, most taking place in conjunction with the rotating meetings of the UH Board of Regents, the students agreed upon an affiliation that exists today as the University of Hawai'i Student Caucus (UHSC). Although the UHSC now functions as an entity recognized and supported by the university administration, it initially was meant to function as an unincorporated association outside of the administration in order to provide the highest degree of independence. Kamakahi and Kamisugi were elected the initial co-chairs of the UHSC. Although each campus had different levels of enrollment, the UHSC founders decided to set two delegates per campus in effort to recognize the importance of each campus, regardless of size.

=== UH Mascot: 1989 ===
In 1989, ASUH allocated $1,600 to create a new mascot. Bows-O the mascot was pink, gap-toothed, and wore a cartoon version of a football helmet. It made its debut at Aloha Stadium during the 1989 homecoming game. The crowd showered the mascot with debris, catcalls, and insults. ASUH called an emergency session and recalled its act three days later. Bows-O was not the official name of the mascot. Mark Takai (ASUH President '89), stated that ASUH "sponsored a contest to give it a name that coincided with the university's nickname, the Rainbows. But before we found a winner, everyone was calling it Bows-O and the name stuck, much to our embarrassment."

=== Full Funding for the University of Hawai‘i System: 1977 ===
In protest to proposed funding cuts made by the Governor and the State Legislature, the ASUH unanimously voted to express its support for full funding in order maintain the quality of education in the University System. The ASUH also gave its full support to "SAVE US," an organization established by the students to rally the student constituency, faculty, and administration in this issue. Calling for the University community to publicly and strongly showcase their support, the ASUH asked the University community to participate in a week-long rally from February 28, 1997, to March 4, 1977, culminating in a march to the State Capitol at 11:00AM on Friday, March 4.

=== Vietnam War Protest: 1970s ===
In May 1970, ASUH called for a week-long strike to protest the Vietnam War and America's bombing of Cambodia. The Leeward Community College student and faculty senates both voted to set aside May 11–16, 1970 as "a special week for consideration of U.S. involvement in Southeast Asia." About three thousand people attended a rally in Andrews Outdoor Theatre (now known as Andrew's Amphitheatre). Class attendance at Manoa was significantly lower during the days the protest was held. University of Hawai'i President Harlan Cleveland directed that no one be failed or given a lower grade for being on strike, since students "have the right to absent themselves on a matter of conscience."

=== ASUH Lecture Series: 1960s ===
During the 1960s, ASUH sponsored visiting lectures at University of Hawaiʻi. Notable speakers include, Martin Luther King Jr., James Farmer, Robert Simmons of the Louisiana White Citizens Council, Communist Party boss Gus Hall, and American Nazi fuhrer George Lincoln Rockwell. Martin Luther King Jr. spoke at Andrew's Amphitheatre.

=== Hawai'i Statehood: 1946 – 1959 ===
Around 1946, ASUH began conducting a national letter-writing campaign advocating for statehood. Student delegates attended a mock convention two years later to draft a "model" state constitution. In March 1946, ASUH senator Ralph Toyota, who was chair of the now defunct Statehood committee, worked with ASUH senators Tom McCabe and Mary Matsumoto to produce a statehood brochure that was sent to all mainland colleges, asking students for their support in promoting statehood for Hawaiʻi.

ASUH senator Patsy Mink, the ASUH Statehood committee chair in January 1948, met with U.S. Senator Guy Cordon of Oregon to get support for statehood. In 1948, the statehood bill that remained stuck in a U.S. Senate committee failed to move to the full Senate. It took another decade before Hawai'i became the 50th state of the United States in 1959.

=== Building of Hemenway Hall: 1938 ===
Hemenway Hall, originally known as the Union building, was built in 1938. It consisted of a cafeteria, lounges, and offices for the student newspaper, the Ka Leo, and the ASUH office. ASUH and the student body contributed $12,000 while faculty, alumn, and the Women's Campus Club gave $10,000. The remaining $85,000 needed to construct the building was contributed by the regents. In 1940 the Union building was renamed after Charles Hemenway.

== Alumni of ASUH ==
=== Federal Elected Officials ===
- Patsy Mink - United States Congress
- Mark Takai (President '89) - United States Congress
- Tammy Duckworth - United States Senate

=== State Elected Officials ===
- Nelson Doi (President '44) – Lt. Governor of Hawaii, Hawaii State Senate President, Circuit Court Judge
- Wadsworth Yee (President '47) – Hawaii State Senate, formerly Hawaii Territorial Senate
- Jann Yuen (President '47) – Hawaii State House of Representatives
- George K. Noguchi (President '47) – Hawaii State House of Representatives
- Carl Takamura (President '65) – Hawaii State House of Representatives
- David Ige (Secretary '78) – Governor of Hawaii, Hawaii State Senate
- Sylvia Luke (President '88) – Lt. Governor of Hawaii, Hawaii State House of Representatives
- Mark Takai (President '89) – Hawaii State House of Representatives
- Winston Sakurai (Secretary '92) – Hawaii State Board of Education.
- Scott Nishimoto (President '96) – Hawaii State House of Representatives
- Jon Karamatsu (Vice-President '97) – Hawaii State House of Representatives
- Kaniela Ing (President '10) – Hawaii State House of Representatives

=== Judicial Appointees ===
- Edward Towse (President '28) – appointed chief justice of the Territorial Supreme Court
- Walter Chuck (President '40)
- Barry Rubin (President '49) – Family Court judge
- Simeon Acoba (Vice President '64) – appointed and confirmed to the Hawaii State Supreme Court
- Linda Luke (President '70) – appointed and confirmed to the District Court of the First Circuit

=== Board of Regents ===
- Simeon Acoba (Vice President '64)- appointed to the Board of Regents
- Scott Leithead (Vice President '69) - appointed to the Board of Regents
- Daniel Ishii (President '75) – appointed to the Board of Regents
- Capsun Poe (Secretary '99) - first ASUH executive officer to be appointed as the student member on the UH Board of Regents
- Michael Dahilig (President '02) – appointed twice to the Board of Regents
- Grant Teichman (President '05–'06) – appointed to the Board of Regents

=== Other Governmental Offices and Appointments ===
- Shunichi Kunimura (President '53) – Mayor of Hawaii County, Circuit Court Judge
- Donna Tanoue (Secretary '75) – former chairperson of the Federal Deposit Insurance Corporation (FDIC) in Washington, D.C.
- Charles Norwood (President '77–'78) – elected to the Hawaii State Board of Education
- Kristopher Kaupalolo (Vice President '01) – appointed to the Hawaii State Post-Secondary Education Commission
