= List of current United States governors =

Party affiliation of United States state and territorial governors as of January 2026: Democratic (24 states, 2 territories, and 1 district) Republican (26 states) Independent (1 territory) New Progressive (Republican affiliated) (1 territory) Non-partisan (Republican affiliated) (1 territory)

The United States has 50 states and 5 territories that each elect a governor to serve as chief executive of the state or territorial government. The sole federal district, the District of Columbia, elects a mayor to oversee its government in a similar manner. In the event of a vacancy, the governor is succeeded by the second-highest-ranking state official; in 45 states and 4 territories, the lieutenant governor is the first in the line of succession.

As of January 2026, there are 26 states with Republican governors and 24 states with Democratic governors. The Democratic Party controls two territorial governorships, the Republican Party controls one, and one is an independent. Jenniffer González-Colón of Puerto Rico is a member of the New Progressive Party, although she is also affiliated with the Republican Party. The federal District of Columbia is governed by a Democratic mayor.

A gubernatorial term ends and new term begins in January for most states and territories, two months after their election; in Alaska, Hawaii, North Dakota, and Kentucky, the term begins in December. Governors serve four-year terms in most states and all territories; New Hampshire and Vermont have two-year terms for their governors. Most states and all but one territory also have term limits that generally allow for two consecutive terms to be served by a candidate. To run for governor, a candidate must generally be a U.S. citizen with prior state residence who meets the minimum age requirement—set at 30 years old in 35 states.

All 55 governors are members of the National Governors Association, a non-partisan organization which represents states and territories in discussions with the federal government. Other organizations for governors include the partisan Democratic Governors Association and Republican Governors Association; and the three regional associations: Midwestern, Northeastern, and Western.

== State governors ==
The longest-serving incumbent U.S. governor is Greg Abbott of Texas, who took office on January 20, 2015. The most recently inaugurated governor is Mikie Sherrill of New Jersey, who took office on January 20, 2026. A total of 15 incumbent governors previously served as lieutenant governor, while 13 previously served in the United States House of Representatives. The governor's office has term limits in 37 states and 4 territories; these terms are four years except in New Hampshire and Vermont, where governors serve two-year terms.

The average age of governors at the time of their inauguration was about 59 years old. Alabama governor Kay Ivey (born 1944) is the oldest incumbent governor, and Arkansas governor Sarah Huckabee Sanders (born 1982) is the youngest. As of January 2026, there are 14 female state governors serving. Of the 50 state governors, 47 are non-Hispanic white, one is Hispanic (Michelle Lujan Grisham of New Mexico), one is Black (Wes Moore of Maryland), and one is Native American (Kevin Stitt of Oklahoma).

The notation "(term limits)" after the year indicates that the governor is ineligible to seek re-election that year; the notation "(retiring)" indicates that the governor has announced their intention not to seek re-election at the end of their term nor to run for another office; the notation "(defeated)" indicates that the governor lost their re-election bid.

Incumbent state governors of the United States
State	Image	Governor	Party	Born	Prior public experience	Term start	Term end	Ref.
Alabama (list)	Photographic portrait of Kay Ivey	Kay Ivey	Republican	October 15, 1944 (age 82)	Lieutenant Governor State Treasurer	April 10, 2017	2027 (term limits)	
Alaska (list)	Photographic portrait of Mike Dunleavy	Mike Dunleavy	Republican	May 5, 1961 (age 65)	Alaska Senate	December 3, 2018	2026 (term limits)	
Arizona (list)	Photographic portrait of Katie Hobbs	Katie Hobbs	Democratic	December 28, 1969 (age 56)	Secretary of State Minority Leader of the Arizona Senate Arizona House	January 2, 2023	2027	
Arkansas (list)	Photographic portrait of Sarah Huckabee Sanders	Sarah Huckabee Sanders	Republican	August 13, 1982 (age 44)	White House Press Secretary	January 10, 2023	2027	
California (list)	Photographic portrait of Gavin Newsom	Gavin Newsom	Democratic	October 10, 1967 (age 59)	Lieutenant Governor Mayor of San Francisco San Francisco Board of Supervisors	January 7, 2019	2027 (term limits)	
Colorado (list)	Photographic portrait of Jared Polis	Jared Polis	Democratic	May 12, 1975 (age 51)	U.S. House Colorado State Board of Education	January 8, 2019	2027 (term limits)	
Connecticut (list)	Photographic portrait of Ned Lamont	Ned Lamont	Democratic	January 3, 1954 (age 72)	Chair of the State Investment Advisory Council Greenwich Board of Estimate and Taxation Greenwich Board of Selectmen	January 9, 2019	2027	
Delaware (list)	Photographic portrait of Matt Meyer	Matt Meyer	Democratic	September 29, 1971 (age 55)	Executive of New Castle County	January 21, 2025	2029	
Florida (list)	Photographic portrait of Ron DeSantis	Ron DeSantis	Republican	September 14, 1978 (age 48)	U.S. House	January 8, 2019	2027 (term limits)	
Georgia (list)	Photographic portrait of Brian Kemp	Brian Kemp	Republican	November 2, 1963 (age 63)	Secretary of State Georgia Senate	January 14, 2019	2027 (term limits)	
Hawaii (list)	Photographic portrait of Josh Green	Josh Green	Democratic	February 11, 1970 (age 56)	Lieutenant Governor Hawaii Senate Hawaii House	December 5, 2022	2026	
Idaho (list)	Photographic portrait of Brad Little	Brad Little	Republican	February 15, 1954 (age 72)	Lieutenant Governor Idaho Senate	January 7, 2019	2027	
Illinois (list)	Photographic portrait of JB Pritzker	JB Pritzker	Democratic	January 19, 1965 (age 61)	Chair of the Illinois Human Rights Commission	January 14, 2019	2027	
Indiana (list)		Mike Braun	Republican	March 24, 1954 (age 72)	U.S. Senate Indiana House	January 13, 2025	2029	
Iowa (list)	Photographic portrait of Kim Reynolds	Kim Reynolds	Republican	August 4, 1959 (age 67)	Lieutenant Governor Iowa Senate Clarke County Treasurer	May 24, 2017	2027 (retiring)	
Kansas (list)	Photographic portrait of Laura Kelly	Laura Kelly	Democratic	January 24, 1950 (age 76)	Kansas Senate	January 14, 2019	2027 (term limits)	
Kentucky (list)	Photographic portrait of Andy Beshear	Andy Beshear	Democratic	November 29, 1977 (age 48)	State Attorney General	December 10, 2019	2027 (term limits)	
Louisiana (list)	Photographic portrait of Josh Green	Jeff Landry	Republican	December 23, 1970 (age 55)	State Attorney General U.S. House	January 8, 2024	2028	
Maine (list)	Photographic portrait of Janet Mills	Janet Mills	Democratic	December 30, 1947 (age 78)	State Attorney General Maine House	January 2, 2019	2027 (term limits)	
Maryland (list)	Photographic portrait of Wes Moore	Wes Moore	Democratic	October 15, 1978 (age 48)	No prior public experience	January 18, 2023	2027	
Massachusetts (list)	Photographic portrait of Maura Healey	Maura Healey	Democratic	February 8, 1971 (age 55)	State Attorney General	January 5, 2023	2027	
Michigan (list)	Photographic portrait of Gretchen Whitmer	Gretchen Whitmer	Democratic	August 23, 1971 (age 55)	Minority Leader of the Michigan Senate Michigan House	January 1, 2019	2027 (term limits)	
Minnesota (list)	Photographic portrait of Tim Walz	Tim Walz	Democratic–Farmer–Labor (Note: The Minnesota Democratic–Farmer–Labor Party is affiliated with the national Democratic Party.)	April 6, 1964 (age 62)	U.S. House	January 7, 2019	2027 (retiring)	
Mississippi (list)	Photographic portrait of Tate Reeves	Tate Reeves	Republican	June 5, 1974 (age 52)	Lieutenant Governor State Treasurer	January 14, 2020	2028 (term limits)	
Missouri (list)	Photographic portrait of Mike Kehoe	Mike Kehoe	Republican	January 17, 1962 (age 64)	Lieutenant Governor Majority Leader of the Missouri Senate	January 13, 2025	2029	
Montana (list)	Photographic portrait of Greg Gianforte	Greg Gianforte	Republican	April 17, 1961 (age 65)	U.S. House	January 4, 2021	2029 (term limits)	
Nebraska (list)	Photographic portrait of Jim Pillen	Jim Pillen	Republican	December 31, 1955 (age 70)	No prior public experience	January 5, 2023	2027	
Nevada (list)	Photographic portrait of Joe Lombardo	Joe Lombardo	Republican	November 8, 1962 (age 64)	Clark County Sheriff	January 2, 2023	2027 (defeated)	
New Hampshire (list)	Photographic portrait of Kelly Ayotte	Kelly Ayotte	Republican	June 27, 1968 (age 58)	U.S. Senate State Attorney General	January 9, 2025	2027	
New Jersey (list)		Mikie Sherrill	Democratic	January 19, 1972 (age 54)	U.S. House	January 20, 2026	2030	
New Mexico (list)	Photographic portrait of Michelle Lujan Grisham	Michelle Lujan Grisham	Democratic	October 24, 1959 (age 67)	U.S. House Bernalillo County Commission State Secretary of Health	January 1, 2019	2027 (term limits)	
New York (list)	Photographic portrait of Kathy Hochul	Kathy Hochul	Democratic	August 27, 1958 (age 68)	Lieutenant Governor U.S. House Erie County Clerk	August 24, 2021	2026 (Note: In New York, gubernatorial terms begin at midnight on New Year's Day.)	
North Carolina (list)	Photographic portrait of Josh Stein	Josh Stein	Democratic	September 13, 1966 (age 60)	State Attorney General North Carolina Senate	January 1, 2025	2029	
North Dakota (list)	Photographic portrait of Kelly Armstrong	Kelly Armstrong	Republican	October 8, 1976 (age 50)	U.S. House Chair of the North Dakota Republican Party North Dakota Senate	December 15, 2024	2028	
Ohio (list)	Photographic portrait of Mike DeWine	Mike DeWine	Republican	January 5, 1947 (age 79)	State Attorney General U.S. Senate Lieutenant Governor U.S. House Ohio Senate Greene County Prosecutor	January 14, 2019	2027 (term limits)	
Oklahoma (list)	Photographic portrait of Kevin Stitt	Kevin Stitt	Republican	December 28, 1972 (age 53)	No prior public experience	January 14, 2019	2027 (term limits)	
Oregon (list)	Photographic portrait of Tina Kotek	Tina Kotek	Democratic	September 30, 1966 (age 60)	Speaker of the Oregon House	January 9, 2023	2027	
Pennsylvania (list)	Photographic portrait of Josh Shapiro	Josh Shapiro	Democratic	June 20, 1973 (age 53)	State Attorney General Montgomery County Board of Commissioners Pennsylvania House	January 17, 2023	2027	
Rhode Island (list)	Photographic portrait of Dan McKee	Dan McKee	Democratic	June 16, 1951 (age 75)	Lieutenant Governor	March 2, 2021	2027 (defeated)	
South Carolina (list)	Photographic portrait of Henry McMaster	Henry McMaster	Republican	May 27, 1947 (age 79)	Lieutenant Governor State Attorney General	January 24, 2017	2027 (term limits)	
South Dakota (list)	Photographic portrait of Larry Rhoden	Larry Rhoden	Republican	February 5, 1959 (age 67)	Lieutenant Governor Secretary of Agriculture South Dakota House South Dakota Senate	January 25, 2025	2027	
Tennessee (list)	Photographic portrait of Bill Lee	Bill Lee	Republican	October 9, 1959 (age 67)	No prior public experience	January 19, 2019	2027 (term limits)	
Texas (list)	Photographic portrait of Greg Abbott	Greg Abbott	Republican	November 13, 1957 (age 69)	State Attorney General Associate Justice of the Texas Supreme Court	January 20, 2015	2027 (defeated)	
Utah (list)	Photographic portrait of Spencer Cox	Spencer Cox	Republican	July 11, 1975 (age 51)	Lieutenant Governor Utah House Sanpete County Commission	January 4, 2021	2029 (retiring)	
Vermont (list)	Photographic portrait of Phil Scott	Phil Scott	Republican	August 4, 1958 (age 68)	Lieutenant Governor Vermont Senate	January 5, 2017	2027	
Virginia (list)		Abigail Spanberger	Democratic	August 7, 1979 (age 47)	U.S. House	January 17, 2026	2030 (term limits)	
Washington (list)	Photographic portrait of Bob Ferguson	Bob Ferguson	Democratic	February 23, 1965 (age 61)	State Attorney General Chair of the King County Council	January 15, 2025	2029	
West Virginia (list)	Photographic portrait of Patrick Morrisey	Patrick Morrisey	Republican	December 21, 1967 (age 58)	State Attorney General	January 13, 2025	2029	
Wisconsin (list)	Photographic portrait of Tony Evers	Tony Evers	Democratic	November 5, 1951 (age 75)	State Superintendent of Public Instruction	January 7, 2019	2027 (retiring)	
Wyoming (list)	Photographic portrait of Mark Gordon	Mark Gordon	Republican	March 14, 1957 (age 69)	State Treasurer	January 7, 2019	2027 (term limits)	

== Territory governors ==
Incumbent territorial governors of the United States
Territory	Image	Governor	Party	Born	Prior public experience	Term start	Term end	Ref.
American Samoa (list)	Photographic portrait of Lemanu Peleti Mauga	Pula Nikolao Pula	Republican	December 31, 1955 (age 70)	Director of the Office of Insular Affairs	January 3, 2025	2029	
Guam (list)	Photographic portrait of Lou Leon Guerrero	Lou Leon Guerrero	Democratic	November 8, 1950 (age 76)	Guam Legislature	January 7, 2019	2027 (term limits)	
Northern Mariana Islands (list)	Photographic portrait of David Apatang	David M. Apatang	Independent	July 10, 1948 (age 78)	Lieutenant Governor Mayor of Saipan Northern Mariana Islands House	July 23, 2025	2027	
Puerto Rico (list)		Jenniffer González-Colón	Republican	August 5, 1976 (age 50)	Resident Commissioner of Puerto Rico Speaker of the House of Representatives of Puerto Rico	January 2, 2025	2029	
U.S. Virgin Islands (list)	Photographic portrait of Albert Bryan	Albert Bryan Jr.	Democratic	February 21, 1968 (age 58)	Commissioner of the Virgin Islands Department of Labor	January 7, 2019	2027 (term limits)	

== Federal district mayor ==
The District of Columbia is a federal district that elects a mayor that has similar powers to those of a state or territorial governor. The cities of Washington and Georgetown within the district elected their own mayors until 1871, when their governments were consolidated into a reorganized District of Columbia by a congressional act. The district's chief executive from 1871 to 1874 was a governor appointed by the president of the United States; the office was replaced by a board of commissioners with three members appointed by the president—two residents and a representative from the United States Army Corps of Engineers. The Board of Commissioners was originally a temporary body but was made permanent in 1878 with one member selected to serve as the Board President, in effect the city's chief executive. The system was replaced in 1967 by a single mayor–commissioner and home rule in the District of Columbia was fully restored in 1975 under a reorganized government led by an elected mayor.

Incumbent federal district mayors of the United States
Federal district	Image	Mayor	Party	Born	Prior public experience	Term start	Term end
District of Columbia (list)	Photographic portrait of Muriel Bowser	Muriel Bowser	Democratic	August 2, 1972 (age 54)	D.C. Council Advisory Neighborhood Commission	January 2, 2015	2027 (retiring)

== See also ==
- Flags of governors of the U.S. states
- List of current United States first spouses
- List of current United States governors by age
- List of current United States lieutenant governors
- List of longest-serving United States governors
- List of female governors in the United States
- List of gubernatorial residences in the United States
- List of minority governors and lieutenant governors in the United States
- List of United States state legislatures
- List of U.S. state governors born outside the United States
- Seals of governors of the U.S. states
