= List of current United States governors by age =

The following is a list of current United States governors by age. This list includes the 50 state governors, the five territorial governors, as well as the mayor of Washington, D.C. in office as of March 4, 2026.

== State governors ==
| State | Governor | Date of birth | Date of inauguration | Age at inauguration | Time in office | Current age | Party |
|---|---|---|---|---|---|---|---|
| Alabama | Kay Ivey | October 15, 1944 | April 10, 2017 | 72 years, 177 days | 8 years, 328 days | 81 years, 140 days | Republican |
| Alaska | Mike Dunleavy | May 5, 1961 | December 3, 2018 | 57 years, 212 days | 7 years, 91 days | 64 years, 303 days | Republican |
| Arizona | Katie Hobbs | December 28, 1969 | January 2, 2023 | 53 years, 5 days | 3 years, 61 days | 56 years, 66 days | Democratic |
| Arkansas | Sarah Huckabee Sanders | August 13, 1982 | January 10, 2023 | 40 years, 150 days | 3 years, 53 days | 43 years, 203 days | Republican |
| California | Gavin Newsom | October 10, 1967 | January 7, 2019 | 51 years, 89 days | 7 years, 56 days | 58 years, 145 days | Democratic |
| Colorado | Jared Polis | May 12, 1975 | January 8, 2019 | 43 years, 241 days | 7 years, 55 days | 50 years, 296 days | Democratic |
| Connecticut | Ned Lamont | January 3, 1954 | January 9, 2019 | 65 years, 6 days | 7 years, 54 days | 72 years, 60 days | Democratic |
| Delaware | Matt Meyer | September 29, 1971 | January 21, 2025 | 53 years, 114 days | 1 year, 42 days | 54 years, 156 days | Democratic |
| Florida | Ron DeSantis | September 14, 1978 | January 8, 2019 | 40 years, 116 days | 7 years, 55 days | 47 years, 171 days | Republican |
| Georgia | Brian Kemp | November 2, 1963 | January 14, 2019 | 55 years, 73 days | 7 years, 49 days | 62 years, 122 days | Republican |
| Hawaii | Josh Green | February 11, 1970 | December 5, 2022 | 52 years, 297 days | 3 years, 89 days | 56 years, 21 days | Democratic |
| Idaho | Brad Little | February 15, 1954 | January 7, 2019 | 64 years, 326 days | 7 years, 57 days | 72 years, 17 days | Republican |
| Illinois | J. B. Pritzker | January 19, 1965 | January 14, 2019 | 53 years, 360 days | 7 years, 49 days | 61 years, 44 days | Democratic |
| Indiana | Mike Braun | March 24, 1954 | January 13, 2025 | 70 years, 295 days | 1 year, 50 days | 71 years, 345 days | Republican |
| Iowa | Kim Reynolds | August 4, 1959 | May 24, 2017 | 57 years, 293 days | 8 years, 284 days | 66 years, 212 days | Republican |
| Kansas | Laura Kelly | January 24, 1950 | January 14, 2019 | 68 years, 355 days | 7 years, 49 days | 76 years, 39 days | Democratic |
| Kentucky | Andy Beshear | November 29, 1977 | December 10, 2019 | 42 years, 11 days | 6 years, 84 days | 48 years, 95 days | Democratic |
| Louisiana | Jeff Landry | December 23, 1970 | January 8, 2024 | 53 years, 16 days | 2 years, 55 days | 55 years, 71 days | Republican |
| Maine | Janet Mills | December 30, 1947 | January 2, 2019 | 71 years, 3 days | 7 years, 61 days | 78 years, 64 days | Democratic |
| Maryland | Wes Moore | October 15, 1978 | January 18, 2023 | 44 years, 95 days | 3 years, 45 days | 47 years, 140 days | Democratic |
| Massachusetts | Maura Healey | February 8, 1971 | January 5, 2023 | 51 years, 331 days | 3 years, 58 days | 55 years, 24 days | Democratic |
| Michigan | Gretchen Whitmer | August 23, 1971 | January 1, 2019 | 47 years, 131 days | 7 years, 62 days | 54 years, 193 days | Democratic |
| Minnesota | Tim Walz | April 6, 1964 | January 7, 2019 | 54 years, 276 days | 7 years, 56 days | 61 years, 332 days | Democratic–Farmer–Labor (Note: The Minnesota Democratic–Farmer–Labor Party is affiliated with the national Democratic Party.) |
| Mississippi | Tate Reeves | June 5, 1974 | January 14, 2020 | 45 years, 223 days | 6 years, 49 days | 51 years, 272 days | Republican |
| Missouri | Mike Kehoe | January 17, 1962 | January 13, 2025 | 62 years, 362 days | 1 year, 50 days | 64 years, 46 days | Republican |
| Montana | Greg Gianforte | April 17, 1961 | January 4, 2021 | 59 years, 262 days | 5 years, 59 days | 64 years, 321 days | Republican |
| Nebraska | Jim Pillen | December 31, 1955 | January 5, 2023 | 67 years, 5 days | 3 years, 58 days | 70 years, 63 days | Republican |
| Nevada | Joe Lombardo | November 8, 1962 | January 2, 2023 | 60 years, 55 days | 3 years, 61 days | 63 years, 116 days | Republican |
| New Hampshire | Kelly Ayotte | June 27, 1968 | January 9, 2025 | 56 years, 196 days | 1 year, 54 days | 57 years, 250 days | Republican |
| New Jersey | Mikie Sherrill | January 19, 1972 | January 20, 2026 | 54 years, 1 day | 43 days | 54 years, 44 days | Democratic |
| New Mexico | Michelle Lujan Grisham | October 24, 1959 | January 1, 2019 | 59 years, 69 days | 7 years, 62 days | 66 years, 131 days | Democratic |
| New York | Kathy Hochul | August 27, 1958 | August 24, 2021 | 62 years, 362 days | 4 years, 192 days | 67 years, 189 days | Democratic |
| North Carolina | Josh Stein | September 13, 1966 | January 1, 2025 | 58 years, 110 days | 1 year, 62 days | 59 years, 172 days | Democratic |
| North Dakota | Kelly Armstrong | October 8, 1976 | December 15, 2024 | 48 years, 68 days | 1 year, 79 days | 49 years, 147 days | Republican |
| Ohio | Mike DeWine | January 5, 1947 | January 14, 2019 | 72 years, 9 days | 7 years, 49 days | 79 years, 58 days | Republican |
| Oklahoma | Kevin Stitt | December 28, 1972 | January 14, 2019 | 46 years, 17 days | 7 years, 49 days | 53 years, 66 days | Republican |
| Oregon | Tina Kotek | September 30, 1966 | January 9, 2023 | 56 years, 101 days | 3 years, 54 days | 59 years, 155 days | Democratic |
| Pennsylvania | Josh Shapiro | June 20, 1973 | January 17, 2023 | 49 years, 211 days | 3 years, 46 days | 52 years, 257 days | Democratic |
| Rhode Island | Dan McKee | June 16, 1951 | March 2, 2021 | 69 years, 259 days | 5 years, 2 days | 74 years, 261 days | Democratic |
| South Carolina | Henry McMaster | May 27, 1947 | January 24, 2017 | 69 years, 242 days | 9 years, 39 days | 78 years, 281 days | Republican |
| South Dakota | Larry Rhoden | February 5, 1959 | January 25, 2025 | 65 years, 355 days | 1 year, 38 days | 67 years, 27 days | Republican |
| Tennessee | Bill Lee | October 9, 1959 | January 19, 2019 | 59 years, 102 days | 7 years, 44 days | 66 years, 146 days | Republican |
| Texas | Greg Abbott | November 13, 1957 | January 20, 2015 | 57 years, 68 days | 11 years, 43 days | 68 years, 111 days | Republican |
| Utah | Spencer Cox | July 11, 1975 | January 4, 2021 | 45 years, 177 days | 5 years, 59 days | 50 years, 236 days | Republican |
| Vermont | Phil Scott | August 4, 1958 | January 5, 2017 | 58 years, 154 days | 9 years, 58 days | 67 years, 212 days | Republican |
| Virginia | Abigail Spanberger | August 7, 1979 | January 17, 2026 | 46 years, 163 days | 46 days | 46 years, 209 days | Democratic |
| Washington | Bob Ferguson | February 23, 1965 | January 15, 2025 | 59 years, 327 days | 1 year, 48 days | 61 years, 9 days | Democratic |
| West Virginia | Patrick Morrisey | December 21, 1967 | January 13, 2025 | 57 years, 23 days | 1 year, 50 days | 58 years, 73 days | Republican |
| Wisconsin | Tony Evers | November 5, 1951 | January 7, 2019 | 67 years, 63 days | 7 years, 56 days | 74 years, 119 days | Democratic |
| Wyoming | Mark Gordon | March 14, 1957 | January 7, 2019 | 61 years, 299 days | 7 years, 56 days | 68 years, 355 days | Republican |

== Territorial governors ==
| Territory | Governor | Date of birth | Date of inauguration | Age at inauguration | Time in office | Current age | Party |
|---|---|---|---|---|---|---|---|
| American Samoa | Pula Nikolao Pula | December 31, 1955 | January 3, 2025 | 69 years, 3 days | 1 year, 60 days | 70 years, 63 days | Republican |
| Guam | Lou Leon Guerrero | November 8, 1950 | January 7, 2019 | 68 years, 60 days | 7 years, 56 days | 75 years, 116 days | Democratic |
| Northern Mariana Islands | David M. Apatang | July 10, 1948 | July 23, 2025 | 77 years, 13 days | 224 days | 77 years, 237 days | Independent |
| Puerto Rico | Jenniffer González-Colón | August 5, 1976 | January 2, 2025 | 48 years, 150 days | 1 year, 61 days | 49 years, 211 days | New Progressive |
| U.S. Virgin Islands | Albert Bryan | February 21, 1968 | January 7, 2019 | 50 years, 320 days | 7 years, 56 days | 58 years, 11 days | Democratic |

== Federal district mayor ==
The District of Columbia is a federal district that elects a mayor that has similar powers to those of a state or territorial governor. The cities of Washington and Georgetown within the district elected their own mayors until 1871, when their governments were consolidated into a reorganized District of Columbia by a congressional act. The district's chief executive from 1871 to 1874 was a governor appointed by the president of the United States; the office was replaced by a board of commissioners with three members appointed by the president—two residents and a representative from the United States Army Corps of Engineers. The Board of Commissioners was originally a temporary body but was made permanent in 1878 with one member selected to serve as the Board President, in effect the city's chief executive. The system was replaced in 1967 by a single mayor–commissioner and home rule in the District of Columbia was fully restored in 1975 under a reorganized government led by an elected mayor.

| District | Mayor | Date of birth | Date of inauguration | Age at inauguration | Time in office | Current age | Party |
|---|---|---|---|---|---|---|---|
| District of Columbia | Muriel Bowser | August 2, 1972 | January 2, 2015 | 42 years, 153 days | 11 years, 61 days | 53 years, 214 days | Democratic |

== Demographics of state governors ==
Note: The following information for currently serving state governors is correct as of 2021.

- Statistics (not counting territorial governors):
  - The median age is 69 years, 80 days.
  - The median age at inauguration is 65 years, 29 days.
  - The median term length is 11 years, 255 days.
  - The average age among Republicans is 69 years, 105 days.
  - The average age among Democrats is 70 years, 6 days.
- Age Ranges:
  - 1 governor is in her 80s;
  - 10 governors are in their 70s;
  - 16 governors are in their 60s;
  - 17 governors are in their 50s; and
  - 6 governors are in their 40s.
- Political Party:
  - 26 Republicans (52%)
  - 24 Democrats (48%)
- Sex:
  - 36 Males (72%)
  - 14 Females (28%)

== See also ==
- List of current United States lieutenant governors by age
- List of current United States governors
