= List of current United States lieutenant governors by age =

This is a list of current United States lieutenant governors by age. Also included are the age of the lieutenant governor at inauguration, and the length of their gubernatorial term to date.

State	Lieutenant Governor	Date of birth	Date of inauguration	Age at inauguration	Length of term to date	Current age	Party
Alabama	Will Ainsworth	March 22, 1981	January 14, 2019	37 years, 298 days	7 years, 286 days	45 years, 219 days	Republican
Alaska	Nancy Dahlstrom	August 13, 1957	December 5, 2022	65 years, 114 days	3 years, 326 days	69 years, 75 days	Republican
Arkansas	Leslie Rutledge	June 9, 1976	January 10, 2023	46 years, 215 days	3 years, 290 days	50 years, 140 days	Republican
California	Eleni Kounalakis	March 3, 1966	January 7, 2019	52 years, 310 days	7 years, 293 days	60 years, 238 days	Democratic
Colorado	Dianne Primavera	January 28, 1950	January 8, 2019	68 years, 345 days	7 years, 292 days	76 years, 272 days	Democratic
Connecticut	Susan Bysiewicz	September 29, 1961	January 9, 2019	57 years, 102 days	7 years, 291 days	65 years, 28 days	Democratic
Delaware	Kyle Evans Gay	July 14, 1986	January 21, 2025	38 years, 191 days	1 year, 279 days	40 years, 105 days	Democratic
Florida	Jay Collins	April 28, 1976	August 12, 2025	49 years, 106 days	1 year, 76 days	50 years, 182 days	Republican
Georgia	Burt Jones	April 25, 1979	January 9, 2023	43 years, 259 days	3 years, 291 days	47 years, 185 days	Republican
Hawaii	Sylvia Luke	December 15, 1967	December 5, 2022	54 years, 355 days	3 years, 326 days	58 years, 316 days	Democratic
Idaho	Scott Bedke	April 27, 1958	January 2, 2023	64 years, 250 days	3 years, 298 days	68 years, 183 days	Republican
Illinois	Juliana Stratton	September 8, 1965	January 14, 2019	53 years, 128 days	7 years, 286 days	61 years, 49 days	Democratic
Indiana	Micah Beckwith	August 15, 1982	January 13, 2025	42 years, 151 days	1 year, 287 days	40 years, 73 days	Republican
Iowa	Chris Cournoyer	July 24, 1970	December 16, 2024	54 years, 145 days	1 year, 315 days	56 years, 95 days	Republican
Kansas	David Toland	May 4, 1977	January 2, 2021	43 years, 243 days	5 years, 298 days	49 years, 176 days	Democratic
Kentucky	Jacqueline Coleman	June 9, 1982	December 10, 2019	37 years, 184 days	6 years, 321 days	44 years, 140 days	Democratic
Louisiana	Billy Nungesser	January 10, 1959	January 11, 2016	57 years, 1 day	10 years, 289 days	67 years, 290 days	Republican
Maryland	Aruna Miller	November 6, 1964	January 18, 2023	58 years, 73 days	3 years, 282 days	61 years, 355 days	Democratic
Massachusetts	Kim Driscoll	August 12, 1966	January 5, 2023	56 years, 146 days	3 years, 295 days	60 years, 76 days	Democratic
Michigan	Garlin Gilchrist	September 25, 1982	January 1, 2019	36 years, 98 days	7 years, 299 days	44 years, 32 days	Democratic
Minnesota	Peggy Flanagan	September 22, 1979	January 7, 2019	39 years, 107 days	7 years, 293 days	47 years, 35 days	Democratic (DFL)
Mississippi	Delbert Hosemann	June 30, 1947	January 14, 2020	72 years, 198 days	6 years, 286 days	79 years, 119 days	Republican
Missouri	David Wasinger	August 9, 1963	January 13, 2025	61 years, 157 days	1 year, 287 days	63 years, 79 days	Republican
Montana	Kristen Juras	October 16, 1955	January 4, 2021	65 years, 80 days	5 years, 296 days	71 years, 11 days	Republican
Nebraska	Joe Kelly	March 17, 1956	January 5, 2023	66 years, 294 days	3 years, 295 days	70 years, 224 days	Republican
Nevada	Stavros Anthony	January 13, 1957	January 2, 2023	65 years, 354 days	3 years, 298 days	69 years, 287 days	Republican
New Jersey	Dale Caldwell	July 6, 1960	January 20, 2026	65 years, 198 days	280 days	66 years, 113 days	Democratic
New Mexico	Howie Morales	January 5, 1973	January 1, 2019	45 years, 361 days	7 years, 299 days	53 years, 295 days	Democratic
New York	Antonio Delgado	January 28, 1977	May 25, 2022	45 years, 117 days	4 years, 155 days	49 years, 272 days	Democratic
North Carolina	Rachel Hunt	May 19, 1965	January 1, 2025	59 years, 227 days	1 year, 299 days	61 years, 161 days	Democratic
North Dakota	Michelle Strinden		December 15, 2024		1 year, 316 days		Republican
Ohio	Jim Tressel	December 5, 1952	February 14, 2025	72 years, 71 days	1 year, 255 days	73 years, 326 days	Republican
Oklahoma	Matt Pinnell	October 19, 1971	January 14, 2019	47 years, 87 days	7 years, 286 days	55 years, 8 days	Republican
Pennsylvania	Austin Davis	October 4, 1989	January 17, 2023	33 years, 105 days	3 years, 283 days	37 years, 23 days	Democratic
Rhode Island	Sabina Matos	February 13, 1974	April 14, 2021	47 years, 60 days	5 years, 196 days	52 years, 256 days	Democratic
South Carolina	Pamela Evette	August 28, 1967	January 9, 2019	51 years, 134 days	7 years, 291 days	59 years, 60 days	Republican
South Dakota	Tony Venhuizen	October 8, 1982	January 30, 2025	42 years, 114 days	1 year, 270 days	44 years, 19 days	Republican
Tennessee	Randy McNally	January 30, 1944	January 10, 2017	72 years, 346 days	9 years, 290 days	82 years, 270 days	Republican
Texas	Dan Patrick	April 4, 1950	January 20, 2015	64 years, 291 days	11 years, 280 days	76 years, 206 days	Republican
Utah	Deidre Henderson	September 4, 1974	January 4, 2021	46 years, 122 days	5 years, 296 days	52 years, 53 days	Republican
Vermont	John S. Rodgers	July 29, 1965	January 9, 2025	57 years, 160 days	1 year, 291 days	61 years, 90 days	Republican
Virginia	Ghazala Hashmi	July 5, 1964	January 17, 2026	61 years, 196 days	283 days	62 years, 114 days	Democratic
Washington	Cyrus Habib	August 22, 1981	January 15, 2025	43 years, 146 days	1 year, 285 days	45 years, 66 days	Democratic
West Virginia	Randy Smith	March 3, 1960	January 8, 2025	64 years, 311 days	1 year, 292 days	66 years, 238 days	Republican
Wisconsin	Sara Rodriguez	July 25, 1975	January 3, 2023	47 years, 162 days	3 years, 297 days	51 years, 94 days	Democratic

== See also ==
- List of current United States governors by age
