= Keith Regan =

American politician (born 1971)

- Regan in 2026

Acting Lieutenant Governor of Hawaii
- Incumbent
- Assumed office April 23, 2026 (Note: Regan serves as acting LG while Sylvia Luke is on leave, while Meoh-Leng Silliman is acting comptroller in his stead.)
- Governor: Josh Green
- Preceded by: Sylvia Luke

Comptroller of Hawaii
- Incumbent
- Assumed office March 25, 2023; On leave: April 23, 2026 – present
- Governor: Josh Green
- Deputy: Meoh-Leng Silliman
- Preceded by: Audrey Hidano

Personal details
- Born: Keith Allen Regan; 1971 (age 54–55) Lawrence, Massachusetts, U.S.
- Party: Democratic
- Spouse: Lynn Araki (m. 2003)
- Children: 1
- Education: DeVry University (BS); University of Phoenix (MBA); University of Southern California (MPA)

Keith Allen Regan (born 1971) is an American politician who serves as the Comptroller of Hawaii and Director of the Department of Accounting and General Services since March 25, 2023. He has also served as acting lieutenant governor of Hawaii since April 2026.

== Early life ==
Keith Regan was born in Lawrence, Massachusetts in 1971 and raised in North Andover, Massachusetts. He graduated high school in 1988 and then moved with his family to Maui that same year. His father had worked for the EPA. The family decided to move to Hawaii after a vacation and realizing the natural beauty of the islands.

Regan earned a Master's public administration from the University of Southern California and attended a program for government executives at the Harvard Kennedy School of Government.

In 1995, Regan started Hawaiʻi Cartage Inc., a trucking company.

== Political career ==
=== Maui politics ===
He served as finance director from January 2, 2003 to July 16, 2004, and managing director from July 16, 2004 to 2007 and from 2011 to 2018 in Maui Mayor Alan Arakawa's administration.

Regan ran for a Wailuku residency seat on the Maui City Council in 2016, but finished in third during the primary. He won 6,017 votes or about 22.3%.

=== State politics ===
Regan was appointed as the Chief Administrative Officer of the Hawaii Tourism Authority (HTA) on December 10, 2018, starting on December 17, 2018. He was praised for his efforts of rebuilding the tourism industry after the COVID pandemic. In July 2022, Regan resigned to move to the Hawaii Department of Commerce and Consumer Affairs, effective August 3, 2022. He worked as a business management Officer at the Hawaii Department of Commerce and Consumer Affairs until March 2023, when he was appointed and confirmed as state comptroller.

==== Comptroller ====
On December 1, 2022, then Governor-Elect Josh Green announced Regan as his nominee to be the Comptroller of the Department of Accounting and General Services (DAGS). On March 9, 2023, the Hawaii Senate Committee on Government Operations voted 5–0 in favor of Regan's confirmation and he was then confirmed by the full Hawaii Senate unanimously, 24–0, on March 25, 2023.

During his tenure at DAGS, Regan helped to develop the New Aloha Stadium Entertainment District Project, building a new jail on O‘ahu, the renovation of the state Capitol, and revamping the DAGS Enterprise Financial System.

==== Acting Lieutenant Governor ====
On April 23, 2026, he was appointed as the acting lieutenant governor of Hawaii due to Lieutenant Governor Sylvia Luke's decision to take a leave of absence due to an ongoing investigation. Per the gubernatorial line of succession, Regan was chosen after the Senate President, Ron Kouchi, House Speaker, Nadine Nakamura and Attorney General, Anne E. Lopez declined to accept the acting position. Kouchi and Nakamura declined due to their re-election bids. Regan chose not to run in the 2026 elections for the office.

== Personal life ==
Regan met his wife, Lynn Araki, through their participation at the Kiwanis Club. They were married in 2003. Araki's family has been in Hawaii for four generations, with her ancestors emigrating from Japan to work on plantations.

Araki-Regan now works as an attorney doing administrative services at Hawaii's Department of Labor and Industrial Relations. Prior to this, she worked as a state tax collector and was the first deputy director of Hawaii's Transportation Department. She worked in the Arakawa administration as Chief of Staff, budget director and acting managing director.

On July 20, 2007, Regan was one of two people in Maui to get botulism.

During his 2016 City Council Campaign, Regan mentioned he also was a former board member of the Maui Memorial Medical Center Foundation, a former president for the California-Nevada-Hawai‘i district of the Kiwanis Club, and the former president Japanese Cultural Society of Maui. From 2017 to 2018, Regan was a board member of Boy Scouts of America in Maui County Council and of the Japanese Cultural Society of Maui. In 2018, he was also the President and CEO of Credit Associates of Maui, which is a debt collector. From 2023 to 2024, Regan was the treasurer of Boy Scouts of America in Maui County Council. Regan and his wife also host a podcast called “Life, Leadership and Love.”, which they started in 2025.

Their only child graduated from UCLA in June 2026.

Political offices
Preceded by Sylvia Luke	Lieutenant Governor of Hawaii; Acting; 2026–present	Incumbent
