= George K. Noguchi =

American politician

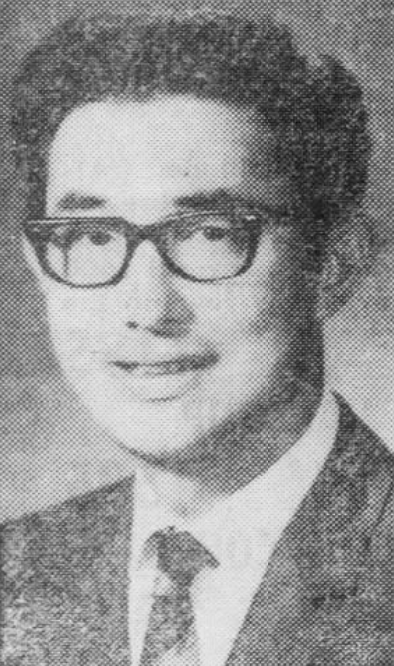
- Noguchi in 1968

Member of the Hawaii House of Representatives
- In office 1967–1968

Personal details
- Born: 1936 (age 89–90) Honolulu, Hawaii, U.S.
- Party: Democratic
- Education: University of Hawaiʻi at Mānoa; George Washington University Law School

George K. Noguchi (born 1936) is an American politician. He served as a Democratic member of the Hawaii House of Representatives.

== Life and career ==
Noguchi was born in Honolulu, Hawaii. He graduated from the University of Hawaiʻi at Mānoa with a bachelor of arts in 1961 and George Washington University Law School.

Noguchi served in the Hawaii House of Representatives from 1967 to 1968.

He was admitted to the Hawaii State Bar Association in 1969.
