= Sylvia Luke =

American politician (born 1967)

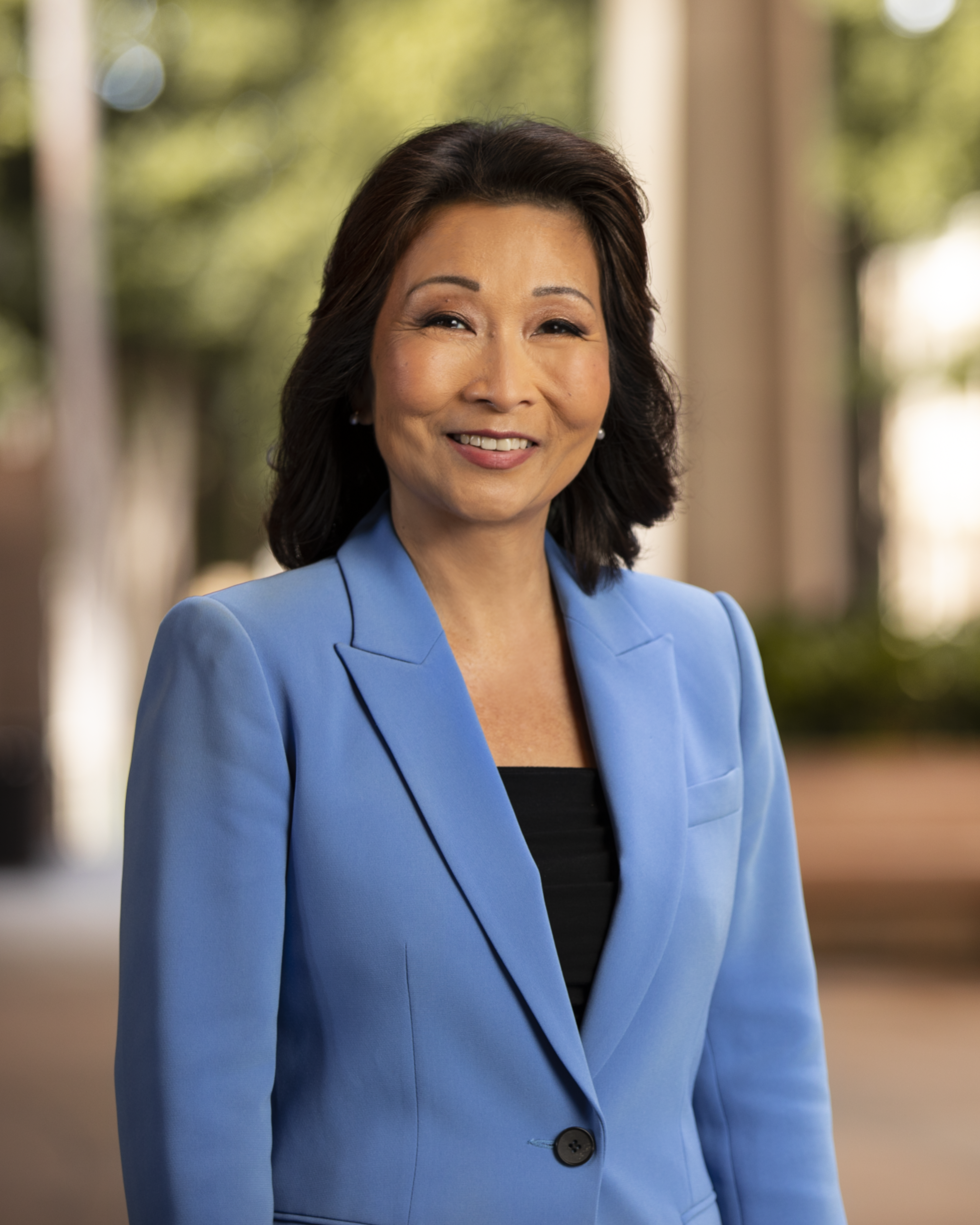
- Luke in 2023

16th Lieutenant Governor of Hawaii
- Incumbent
- Assumed office December 5, 2022; On leave: April 23, 2026 – present (Note: Keith Regan serves as acting LG during Luke's leave.)
- Governor: Josh Green
- Preceded by: Josh Green

Member of the Hawaii House of Representatives
- In office November 3, 1998 – November 8, 2022
- Preceded by: Quentin Kawānanakoa
- Succeeded by: Redistricted
- Constituency: 26th district (1998–2012); 25th district (2012–2022)

Personal details
- Born: Chang Eun Jung; December 15, 1967 (age 58) Seoul, South Korea
- Party: Democratic
- Spouse: Michael Luke (m. 1996)
- Children: 1
- Education: University of Hawaiʻi at Mānoa (BA); University of San Francisco (JD)

Sylvia Eun Jung Luke (née Chang, born December 15, 1967) is an American politician who has served since 2022 as the 16th Lieutenant Governor of Hawaii. (Note: On leave due to campaign finance scandals. Keith Regan, state comptroller, is serving as acting lieutenant governor during Luke's leave.) A member of the Democratic party, she served in the Hawaii House of Representatives representing the 26th district from 1998 to 2013, and the 25th district from 2013 to 2022. Luke is the first politician of South Korean descent to be elected to a statewide office in the United States.

In 2026, Luke took a leave of absence following a grand jury indictment for bribery.

== Early life and education ==
Sylvia Luke was born Chang Eun Jung (장은정) on December 15, 1967, in Seoul, South Korea, the eldest child of businessman Yun Hoo “Paul” Chang and Yun Ja Chang. Luke's Korean name, Eun, meaning silver, inspired her mother to have her English name be Sylvia. Luke's father passed away when she was 16 following complications from a stroke.

Luke's family moved to Hawaiʻi when she was nine years old. She attended Queen Kaahumanu Elementary School, where her homeroom teacher volunteered to coach her English skills after school. Luke later attended Lincoln Elementary School and Kawananakoa Middle School before graduating from Roosevelt High School in 1985. While in her junior and senior years at Roosevelt, Luke conducted independent research at the University of Hawaiʻi at Mānoa on genetics in entomology.

Luke earned a Bachelor of Arts degree from the University of Hawaiʻi at Mānoa and a Juris Doctor from the University of San Francisco School of Law. She also spent a semester studying international studies at Yonsei University in Korea, and attend the University of Hawaii's William S. Richardson School of Law for her last year of law school.

== Early career ==
Luke worked as an attorney after graduating from law school until being elected in 1998.

== Hawaii House of Representatives ==
Luke served from November 1998 until 2013 in the Hawaii House of Representatives for the 26th district, and from November 2012 until 2022 for the 25th district, overall representing Makiki, Punchbowl, Nuʻuanu, Dowsett Highlands, Pacific Heights, and Pauoa. In addition to serving as a legislator, she worked as an attorney in private practice.

Luke served as Vice Chair of the House Committee on Economic Development and Business Concerns, Vice Speaker from 2001 to 2004, Chair of the House Select Committee on War Preparedness, and Chair of the House Committee on Judiciary from 2005 to 2006. Her time as Judiciary chair would see her voicing support for policies of harsher punishments for sex offenders and convicted felons with significant crimes. She was the first woman to chair the Finance Committee in the Legislature's history.

=== Chair of House Committee on Finance (2013–2022) ===
As Chair of the House Committee on Finance, Luke created a legislative working group to work towards maximizing federal reimbursements for Medicaid, claiming the Hawaii Department of Education could recover up to $50 million to $100 million more a year. She would also take steps to regain control over state spending, including vocalizing support for transparency, prioritizing spending, and special funds. Luke later introduced legislation for regular reviews of tax credits and exemptions.

During the COVID-19 pandemic, Luke worked to allocate federal relief funds from the Coronavirus Aid, Relief, and Economic Security Act (CARES) to allocated for rent subsidies, unemployment insurance, and personal protective equipment (PPE) for schools and hospitals with help from the House Select Committee on COVID-19 Economic and Financial Preparedness. She also established a satellite unemployment insurance claims center at the Convention Center to help process backlogged unemployment claims and direct federal funding to local business recovery efforts, and extended COVID-19 relief funds to cover proposed cuts for social services.

== Lieutenant governor of Hawaiʻi ==
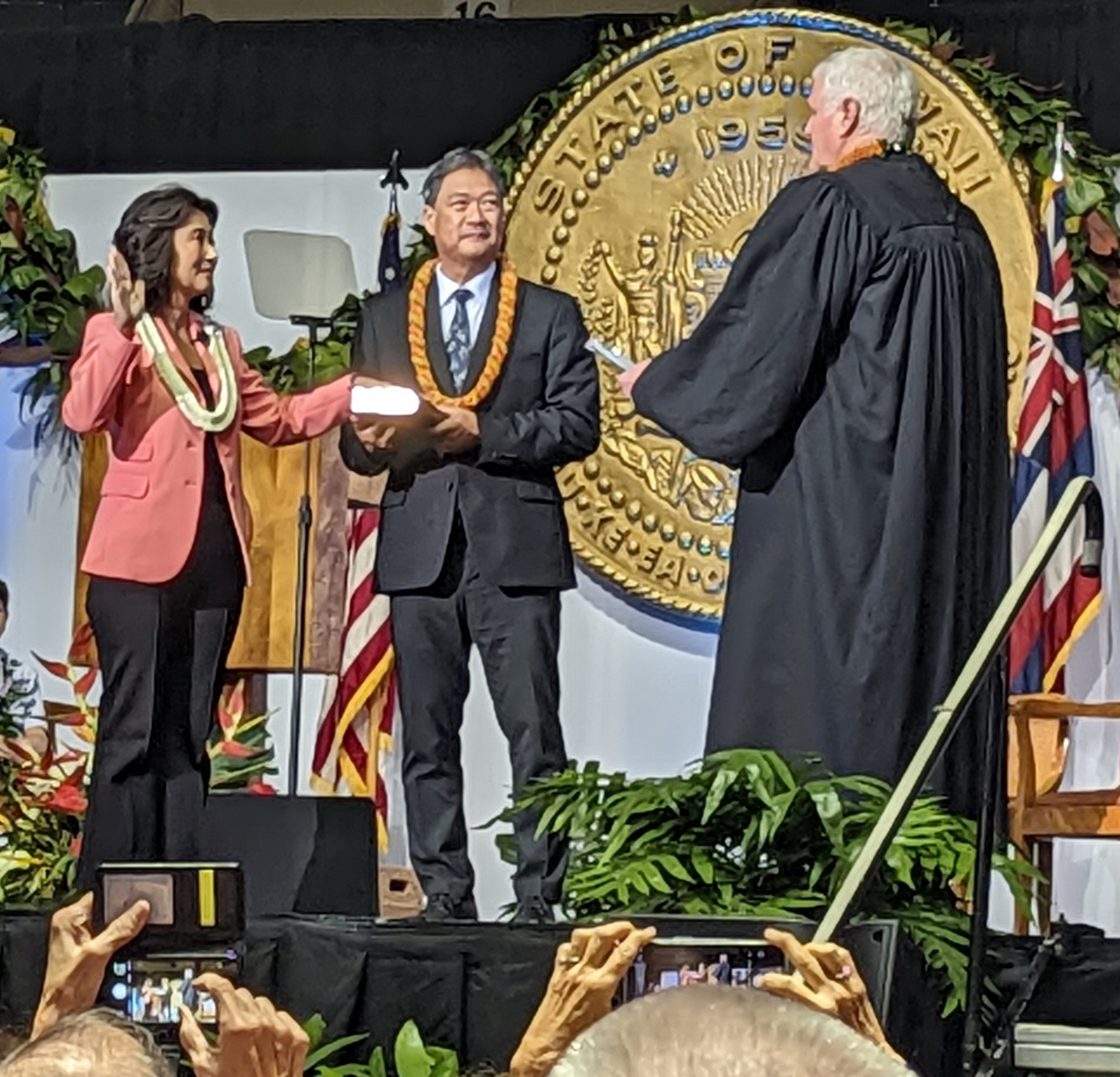
Luke being sworn in as lieutenant governor of Hawaii in 2022 by Hawaii Chief Justice Mark E. Recktenwald

=== 2022 campaign for lieutenant governor ===
In 2021, Luke announced her intention to run for Lieutenant Governor of Hawaii. Luke won the Democratic primary for lieutenant governor and was elected alongside Democratic gubernatorial nominee Josh Green in the November general election. Luke was inaugurated as the 16th Lieutenant Governor of Hawaiʻi on December 5, 2022.

=== Tenure ===
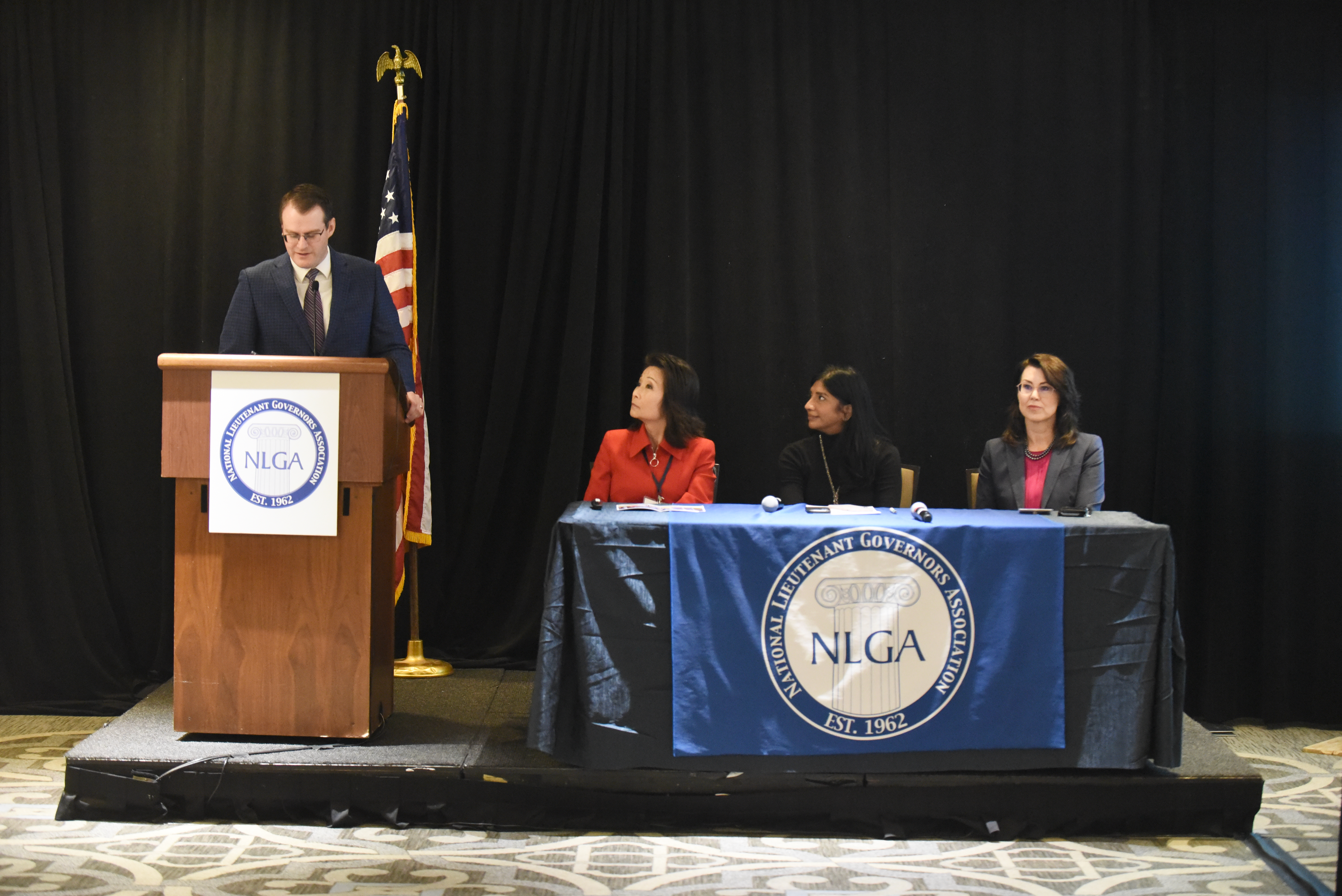
Luke in 2023 on a National Lieutenant Governors Association panel with Lt. Governors Aruna Miller and Deidre Henderson

In January 2023, Luke launched the Ready Keiki initiative to grow preschool capacity and facilities through classroom expansion and subsidies, citing her experiences as a working mother of difficult access to preschools and child care is for lower income families. Luke also utilized federal funds to modernize the state's broadband access and coordinate federal funding strategies. Additionally, Luke introduced legislation to update outdated systems, including the state's Apostille system, but would ultimately see the bill vetoed. The system was eventually be updated in 2025.

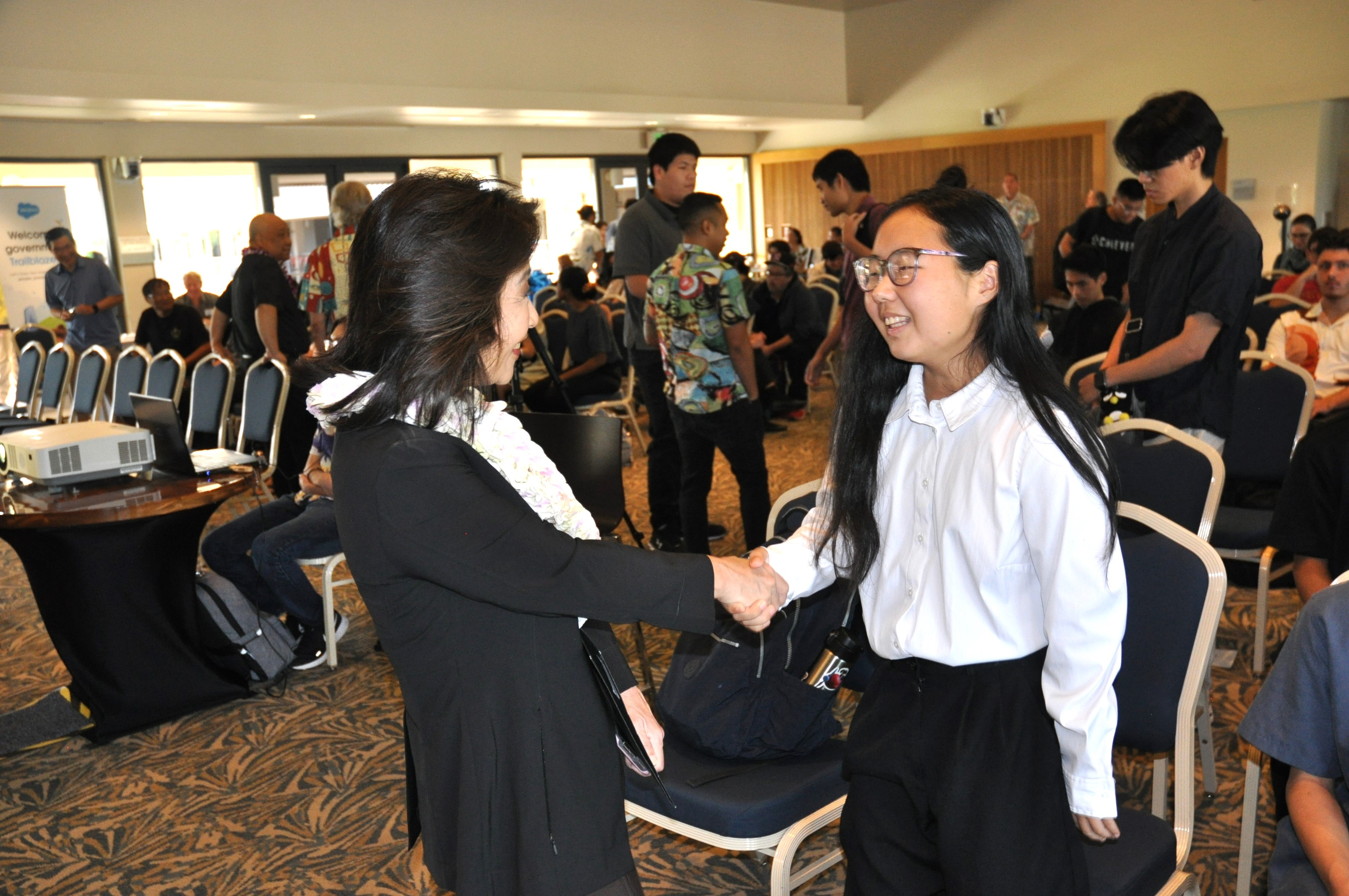
Luke greets a student at the 2023 Hawaii Annual Code Challenge at the University of Hawaii at West Oahu.

==== 2023 Maui and Hawaii Island Fires ====
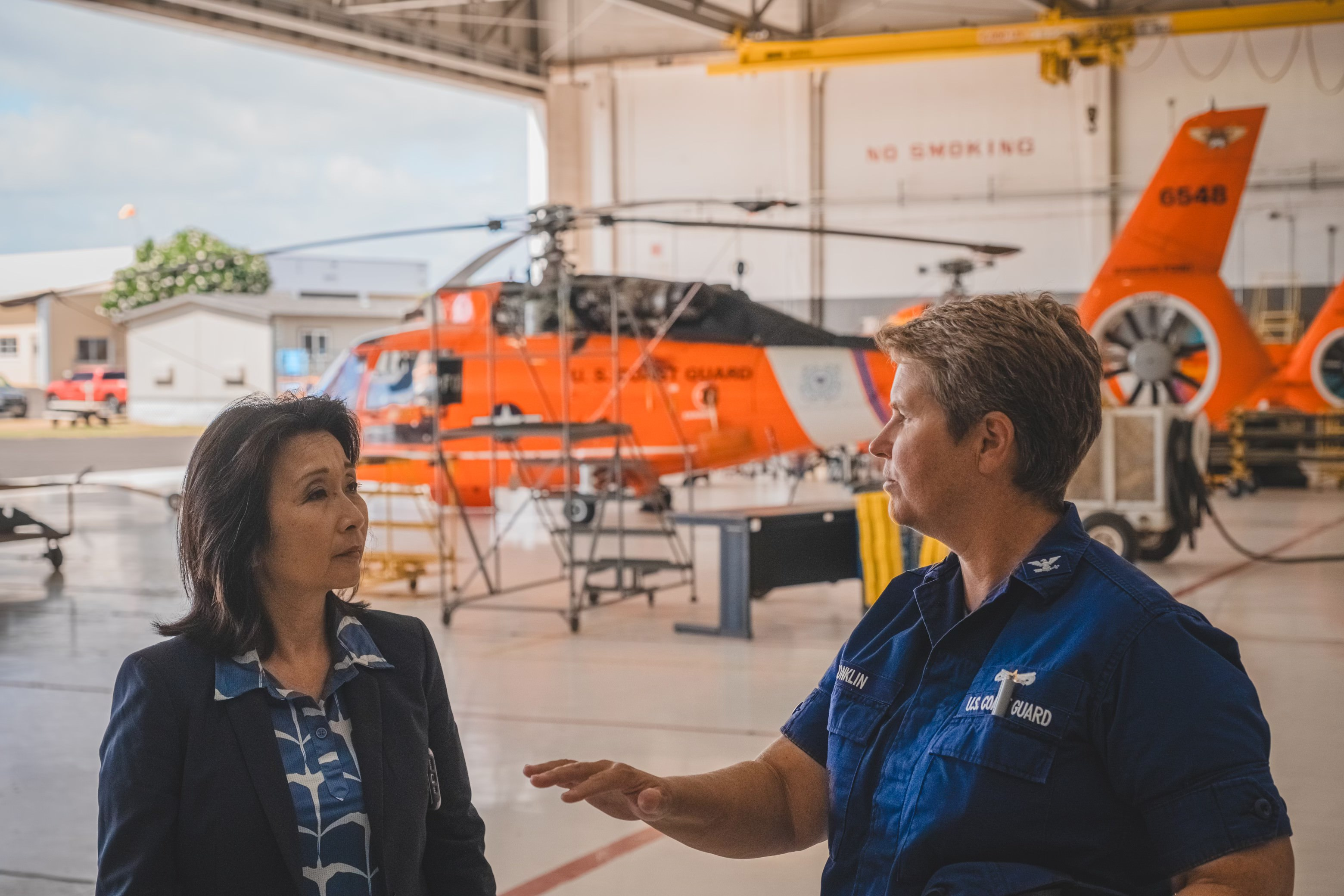
Lt. Gov. Sylvia Luke prepares to fly aboard a Coast Guard C-130 to assess the fire damage and observe response efforts firsthand August 9, 2023. A total of 17 lives were saved from the water and 40 survivors were located ashore by Coast Guard Station Maui boat crews.

Serving as acting Governor during the start of the August 2023 fires in Maui and Hawaiʻi, Luke declared a state of emergency and issued an emergency proclamation, activating the National Guard and authorized expenditures for disaster relief. She would further coordinate with local groups, including Council for Native Hawaiian Advancement, Mahi Pono, the Salvation Army, the County of Maui, and the Office of Hawaiian Affairs, to set up donation and distribution sites for those affected by the Maui fires.

==== Hawaiʻi–South Korea relations ====
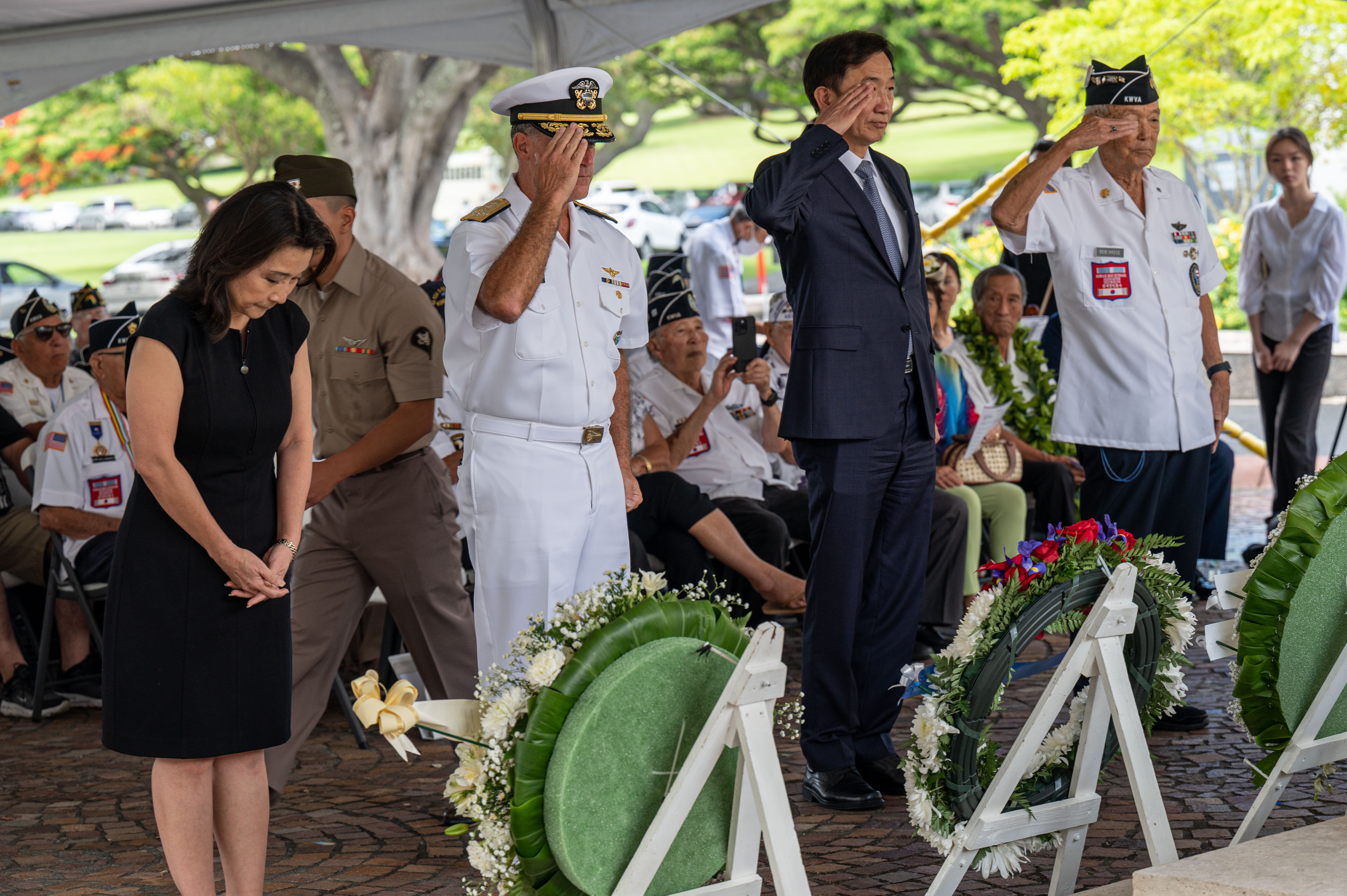
Lt. Gov. Sylvia Luke, Adm. John C. Aquilino, Commander U.S. Indo-Pacific Command, Seo Young, Consul General of the Republic of Korea, and Bob Imose, Korean War veteran, salute after a wreath laying at the 73rd Korean War Commemoration Ceremony at the National Memorial Cemetery of the Pacific at Punchbowl. The event also marked 70 years of the U.S.-ROK Alliance.

Luke has used her position as a Korean immigrant and the first Korean American elected to a statewide office to promote bilateral ties between the Republic of Korea and both Hawaiʻi and the United States. In December 2022, Luke met with the intelligence committee Chair of the South Korean National Assembly and spoke at an event hosted by the Consulate General of Korea.

On August 19, 2023, the South Korean government and Consul General Lee Seo Young worked with Luke to donate $2 million USD for Maui fire disaster relief.

== Bribery case ==
On January 20, 2022, then-Representative Luke was reported to have attended a dinner alongside Representative Ty Cullen with a lobbyist and his stepdaughter, in which Luke received $10,000. Though not having reported the money until February 2026, she attempted to return the money in March 2022 following a guilty plea by Cullen and Senator Jamie Kalani English for accepting bribes. Luke claimed the missed report as an error by her staff.

On March 27, 2025, Honolulu Civil Beat reported on an improperly redacted court filing that detailed a lawmaker accepting $35,000 on January 20, 2022, following a recording made by Cullen for the Federal Bureau of Investigation.

Attorney General Anne E. Lopez launched an investigation into the $35,000 in late January 2026, later identifying Luke as the target of a bribery investigation. On April 19, 2026, Luke withdrew her candidacy for reelection as Lieutenant Governor amid the scandal. Governor Josh Green canceled his trip to Washington D.C. as to "ensure steady leadership for our state during this time".

On April 23, 2026, it was announced that Luke would take an unpaid leave of absence and state comptroller Keith Regan would assume her constitutional duties.

On July 24, 2026, an Oʻahu grand jury indicted Luke and four others on charges of conspiracy to commit bribery, bribery by a public servant, and falsifying candidate committee reports in connection with the state attorney general's investigation into Hawaiʻi's COVID-19 community testing program run by lobbyist Toby Solidum. Luke surrendered to authorities, posted bail, and, through her attorneys, denied the allegations. Following the indictment, on July 25, 2026, Governor Josh Green called on Luke to resign.

== Personal life ==
She is married to Michael Luke and has one son. The couple met in college while both were serving as senators for the Associated Students of the University of Hawaii. Luke has two dogs, Musubi and Momo.

== Electoral history ==
- 1998 When Republican Representative Quentin Kawānanakoa retired and left the District 26 seat open, she won the three-way September 19, 1998 Democratic Primary with 1,476 votes (44.9%), and won the November 3, 1998 General election with 4,914 votes (54.4%) against Republican nominee Christopher Dawson.
- 2000 she was unopposed for the September 23, 2000 Democratic Primary, winning with 3,400 votes, and won the November 5, 2002 General election with 4,344 votes (54.4%) against Republican nominee David Pang.
- 2002 she was unopposed for the September 21, 2002 Democratic Primary, winning with 3,474 votes, and won the November 5, 2002 General election with 5,317 votes (57.3%) against Republican nominee Signe Godfrey, who had been redistricted from District 6.
- 2004 she was unopposed for the September 18, 2004 Democratic Primary, winning with 3,520 votes, and won the November 2, 2004 General election with 6,245 votes (62.5%) against Republican nominee Bob Tom.
- 2006 Luke and Tom were both unopposed for their September 26, 2006 primaries, setting up a rematch; she won the November 7, 2006 General election with 4,918 votes (60.1%) against Tom.
- 2008 she was unopposed for the September 20, 2008 Democratic Primary, winning with 3,550 votes, and was unopposed for the November 4, 2008 General election.
- 2010 she won the September 18, 2010 Democratic Primary with 4,688 votes (75.7%), and won the November 2, 2010 General election with 6,189 votes (69.5%) against Republican nominee Norm Katz.
- 2012 Redistricted to District 25, and with Democratic Representative Della Au Belatti redistricted to District 24, she was unopposed for both the August 11, 2012 Democratic Primary, winning with 4,319 votes, and the November 6, 2012 General election.
- 2022 she won the 13 August 2022 Hawaii Lieutenant Governor Democratic Primary, race called by The Associated Press.

== Awards and Recognitions ==
- Friends of the Library of Hawaii Legislator of the Year, 2022
- AARP Hawaiʻi Retirement Savings Champion, 2022
- Hawaiʻi Restaurant Association Hall of Fame Industry Advocate, 2022
- Hawaiʻi Dental Association Legislator of the Year, 2022
- Adult Friends for Youth "Pearl Hero", 2022
- Healthcare Association of Hawaiʻi Achievement in Advocacy Award, 2019
- Hawaii Farm Bureau Legislator of the Year, 2017
- AARP Hawaii Certificate of Appreciation for CARE Act, 2016
- Guide Dogs of Hawaii Certificate of Appreciation for supporting Visually Impaired Children in Hawaii, 2016
- Hawaii State Hospital Door to Hawaii's Future for supporting the Goddard Project, 2015
- US Japan Council's Asian American Leadership Program Delegate, 2014
- Hawaii Women Lawyers Distinguished Service Award, 2014
- Healthcare Association of Hawaiʻi State Representative of the Year, 2014
- Hawaii Wholesale Liquor Dealers Association Legislator of the Year Award, 2013
- Easter Seals Hawaii Certificate of Appreciation, 2013
- Humane Society of the United States Humane State Legislator Award, 2006
- Republic of Korea National Assembly Congratulatory Award, 2006
- AARP Hawaii Certificate of Appreciation for Consumer Protection, 2006
- Korean American Coalition Pioneer Award in Leadership, 2003
- Hawaii Jaycees Three Outstanding Young Persons, 2001
- Hawaii Technology Trade Association Outstanding Civic Leadership Award, 2000

== See also ==
- List of minority governors and lieutenant governors in the United States

== Notes ==
Party political offices
Preceded by Josh Green	Democratic nominee for Lieutenant Governor of Hawaii; 2022	Succeeded by Derek Kawakami
Political offices
Preceded by Josh Green	Lieutenant Governor of Hawaii; 2022–present On leave: 2026–present	Incumbent
