= 2026 Northern Mariana Islands gubernatorial election =

- November 3, 2026 (first round); November 20, 2026 (second round)
- Reporting: 93.9% as of November 21, 2026; 10:49 AM ChST
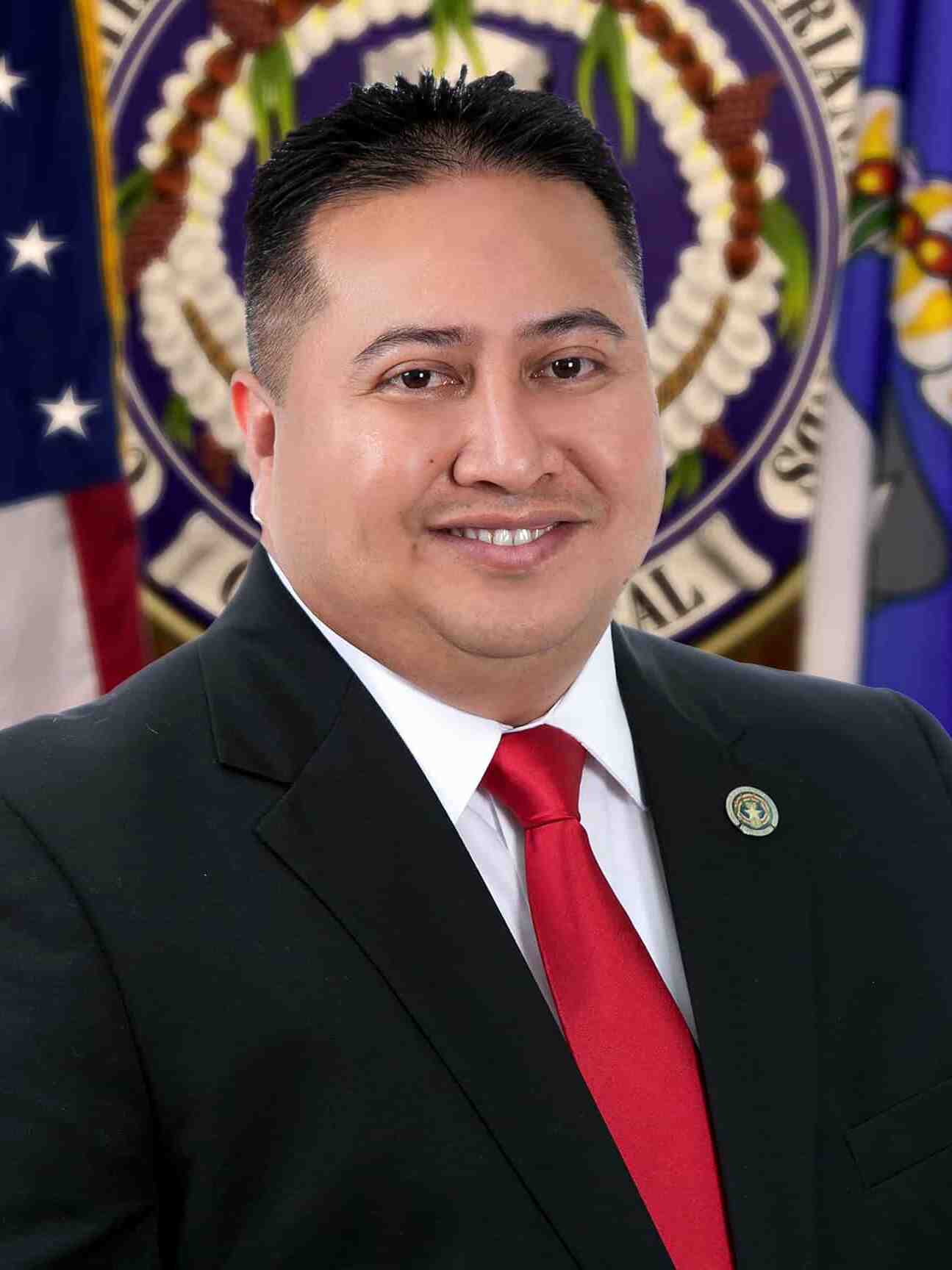

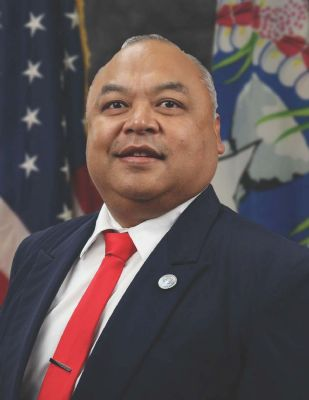

Nominee	Ralph Torres	Blas T. Attao	Lawrence F. Camacho
Party	Republican	Independent	Independent
Alliance		Democratic
Running mate	Ben Jones	Edmund Villagomez	Edith DeLeon Guerrero
First round	6,437; 49.5%	5,043; 38.7%	1,537; 11.8%
Runoff	6,352; 53.1%	5,609; 46.9%	Eliminated
Incumbent Governor
David M. Apatang
Independent

The 2026 Northern Mariana Islands gubernatorial election was held on November 3, 2026, to elect the governor of the Northern Mariana Islands. Incumbent governor David M. Apatang, who was elevated to the role on July 23, 2025, after the death of Arnold Palacios, declined to run for a full term in office. No candidate won a majority of votes, forcing a runoff election on November 20, 2026.

== Background ==
A governing coalition made up of independents and Democrats has governed the Northern Mariana Islands since 2023. In the 2024 general election, Republicans won the open US delegate seat while independents not aligned with the Palacios administration made modest gains in the legislature.

The Republican National Committee announced Palacios rejoined the Republican Party after the 2024 elections. Palacios' return received a lukewarm to hostile reception from local Republicans. Governor Arnold Palacios died on July 23, 2025, and was succeeded by Lieutenant Governor David M. Apatang.

== Candidates ==
=== Declared ===
- Blas T. Attao, former speaker of the Northern Mariana Islands House of Representatives (2019–2021) (Independent)
  - Running mate: Edmund Villagomez, speaker of the Northern Mariana Islands House of Representatives (2021–present)
- Lawrence F. Camacho, commissioner of education (2024–present) (Independent)
  - Running mate: Edith DeLeon Guerrero, former president of the Northern Mariana Islands Senate (2023–2025) from the 3rd district (2021–2025)
- Ralph Torres, former governor (2015–2023) (Republican)
  - Running mate: Ben Jones, principal of Kagman High School

=== Withdrawn ===
- Vinnie Sablan, former territorial senator and nominee for lieutenant governor in 2022 (running for Senate)

=== Declined ===
- David M. Apatang, incumbent governor of the Northern Mariana Islands (2025–present) (endorsed Attao)

== General election ==
=== Endorsements ===
Blas T. Attao (I)

U.S. representatives

- Gregorio Sablan, former House delegate from MP-AL (2009–2025) (Democratic)

Statewide officials

- David Apatang, governor of the Northern Mariana Islands (2025–present)

Political parties

- CNMI Democratic Party
Ralph Torres (R)

U.S. representatives

- Kimberlyn King-Hinds, House delegate from MP-AL (2025–present)

Statewide officials

- Benigno Fitial, former governor of the Northern Mariana Islands (2006–2013)

=== Results ===
2026 Northern Mariana Islands gubernatorial election
Party	Candidate	Running mate	First round		Second round	
Party	Candidate	Running mate	Votes	%	Votes	%
Republican	Ralph Torres	Ben Jones	6,437	49.5%	6,352	53.1%
Independent Democrat	Blas T. Attao	Edmund Villagomez	5,043	38.7%	5,609	46.9%
Independent	Lawrence Camacho	Edith DeLeon Guerrero	1,537	11.8%		
Total votes			13,017	100.0%	11,961	100.0%
TBD gain from Independent						

== See also ==
- 2026 United States gubernatorial elections
- Elections in the Northern Mariana Islands
