= 2026 United States House of Representatives election in the Northern Mariana Islands =

- November 3, 2026
- Reporting: 93.3% as of 3:00 PM EDT
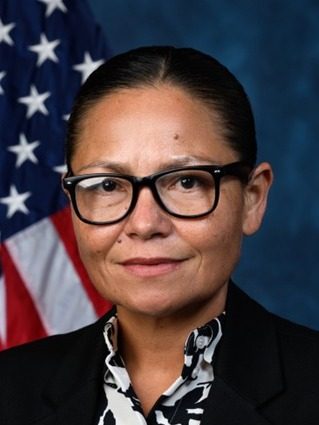

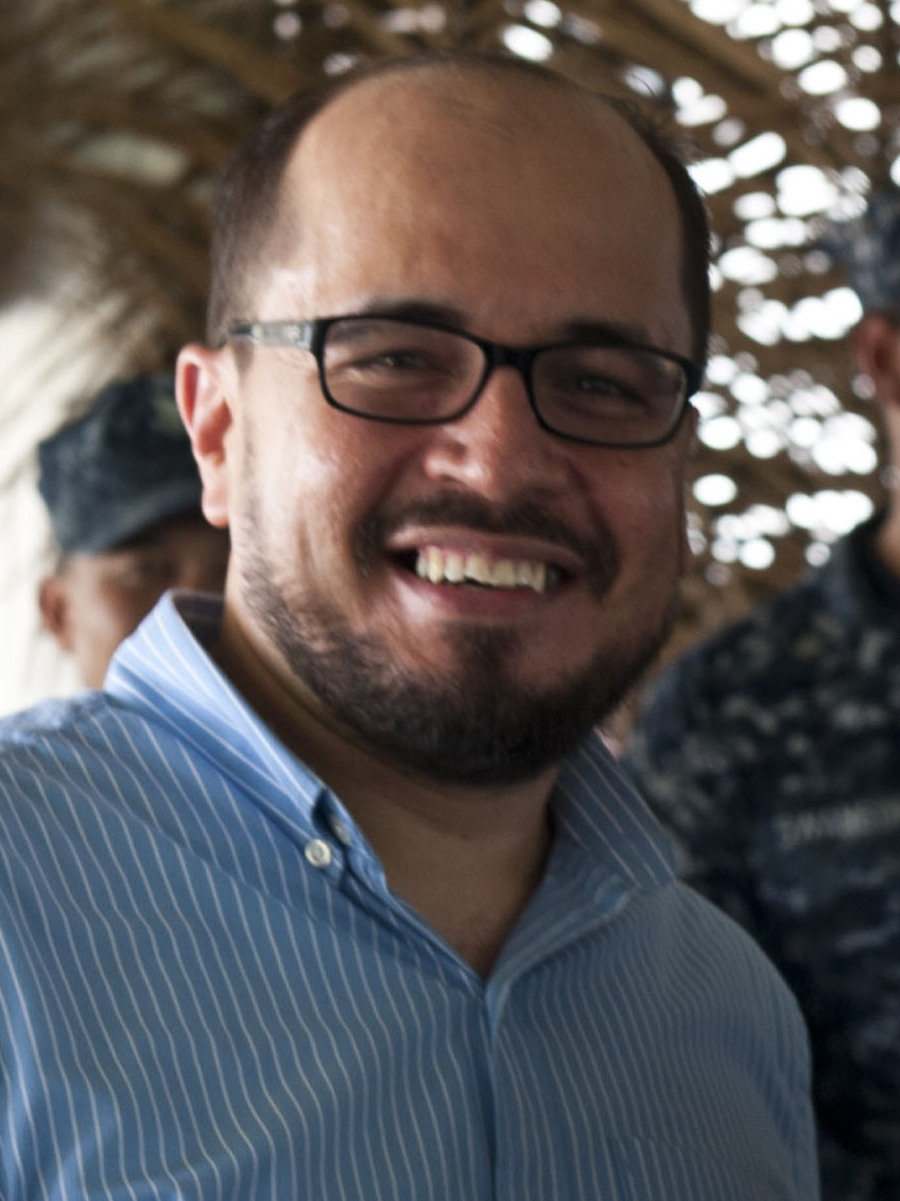
Candidate	Kimberlyn King-Hinds	Galvin Deleon Guerrero
Party	Republican	Independent
Alliance		Democratic
Popular vote	8,194	4,675
Percentage	63.67%	36.33%
- Results by voting district
Delegate before election
Kimberlyn King-Hinds
Republican
Elected Delegate
Kimberlyn King-Hinds
Republican

The 2026 United States House of Representatives election in the Northern Mariana Islands was held on November 3, 2026, to elect the territory's delegate to the United States House of Representatives. The Delegate, who is elected to a two-year term, represents the Northern Mariana Islands' at-large congressional district in the U.S. House of Representatives. The election coincided with the larger 2026 United States House of Representatives elections and the 2026 Northern Mariana Islands general election.

Incumbent Republican delegate Kimberlyn King-Hinds was elected in 2024 with 40.3% of the vote and was re-elected in this election with 63.7% of the vote.

== Background ==
Incumbent King-Hinds was first elected in 2024, becoming the first female delegate in the history of the Northern Mariana Islands to the U.S. House of Representatives. She defeated her main opponent, Democratic nominee Ed Propst, 40.3% to 33.2% of the vote.

== Republican primary ==
=== Candidates ===
After King-Hinds submitted her letter of intent to run for delegate, party chairman Patrick M. Cepeda announced the party would not be considering other candidates for the nomination or holding a primary in deference to King Hinds’ incumbency.

==== Declared ====
- Kimberlyn King-Hinds, incumbent U.S. delegate (2025–present)

==== Disqualified ====
- Gavin Solomon, businessman from New York

=== Endorsements ===
Kimberlyn King-Hinds

Political parties

- CNMI Republican Party

=== Fundraising ===
Campaign finance reports as of June 30, 2026
Candidate	Raised	Spent	Cash on hand
Kimberlyn King-Hinds (R)	$64,121	$59,438	$12,152
Source: Federal Election Commission

== Independents ==
=== Candidates ===
==== Declared ====
- Galvin Deleon Guerrero, president of Northern Marianas College and nephew of former delegate Gregorio Sablan

== General election ==
=== Fundraising ===
Campaign finance reports as of October 14, 2026
Candidate	Raised	Spent	Cash on hand
Kimberlyn King-Hinds (R)	$103,386	$95,596	$16,214
Galvin Deleon Guerrero (I)	$31,476	$22,321	$9,255
Source: Federal Election Commission

=== Results ===
2026 Northern Mariana Islands' at-large congressional district election
Party	Candidate	Votes	%	±%
Republican	Kimberlyn King-Hinds (incumbent)	8,194	63.67%	
Independent	Galvin Deleon Guerrero	4,675	36.33%	
Total votes				
