= 2024 United States House of Representatives election in Northern Mariana Islands =

2024 United States House of Representatives election in the Northern Mariana Islands
- November 5, 2024
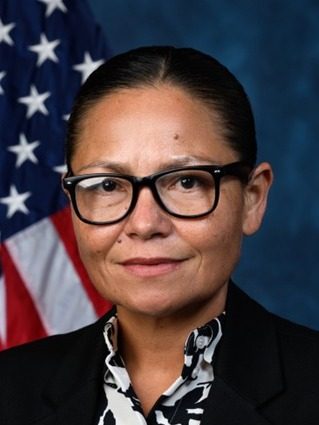

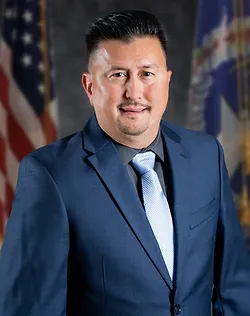

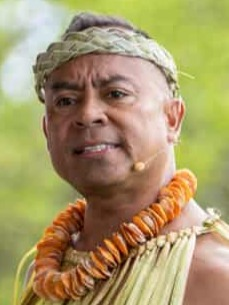

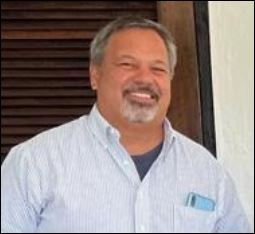
Nominee	Kimberlyn King-Hinds	Ed Propst
Party	Republican	Democratic
Popular vote	4,931	4,067
Percentage	40.34%	33.27%
Nominee	John Gonzales	James Rayphand
Party	Independent	Independent
Popular vote	2,282	665
Percentage	18.67%	5.44%
- Results by voting district: Kimberlyn Kay King-Hinds: 35–40% 40–45% 45–50% 50–55% 80–85% Edwin Kenneth Propst: 35–40% 40–45% No votes
Delegate before election
Gregorio Sablan
Democratic
Elected Delegate
Kimberlyn King-Hinds
Republican

The 2024 United States House of Representatives election in the Northern Mariana Islands was held on Tuesday, November 5, 2024, to elect the territory's delegate to the United States House of Representatives in the 119th United States Congress. The Delegate, who is elected to a two-year term, represents the Northern Mariana Islands' at-large congressional district in the U.S. House of Representatives.

The election coincided with the larger 2024 United States House of Representatives elections and the 2024 Northern Mariana Islands general election.

Incumbent Representative Gregorio Sablan decided to retire rather than seek re-election to a ninth term in office. Republican Kimberlyn King-Hinds won the seat over Democrat Ed Propst, flipping the seat to Republican control for the first time ever. The election of King-Hinds means that every state and territory in the United States has elected a woman to Congress. It was also the first contested election for this seat since 2018.

== Race background ==
Gregorio "Kilili" Sablan was first elected in 2008, becoming the first delegate to the United States House of Representatives in the history of the Northern Mariana Islands. He has held the seat since its creation. In 2022, Sablan was re-elected unopposed in the November election. On January 18, 2024, Sablan announced that he would not seek re-election.

== Democratic primary ==
The CNMI Democratic Party endorsed Ed Propst.

=== Declared ===
- Ed Propst, floor leader of the Northern Mariana Islands House of Representatives

=== Declined ===
- Gregorio Sablan, incumbent delegate (2009–present) (endorsed Propst)

=== Endorsements ===
Ed Propst

U.S. Delegates

- Gregorio Sablan, Delegate to the U.S. House of Representatives from MP-AL (2009–present)

Governors

- Arnold Palacios, Governor of the Northern Mariana Islands (2023–present) (Independent)

Lieutenant Governors

- David Apatang, Lieutenant Governor of the Northern Mariana Islands (2023–present) (Independent)

Territorial legislators

- Tina Sablan, territorial representative from the 2nd district (2008–2010, 2015–2023)
- Ralph Naraja Yamul, territorial representative from the 3rd district (2019–present) (Independent)

Political parties

- CNMI Democratic Party

== Republican primary ==
The Republican Party canceled the primaries and endorsed Kimberlyn King-Hinds as their candidate after John Gonzales withdrew from the primary and announced that he will be running as an independent.

=== Declared ===
- Kimberlyn King-Hinds, former chair of the Commonwealth Ports Authority Board of Directors

=== Withdrawn ===
- John Gonzales, business consultant and independent candidate for U.S. House in 2008 (running as an independent)

=== Endorsements ===
Kimberlyn King-Hinds

Political parties

- CNMI Republican Party

== Independents ==
=== Declared ===
- John Gonzales, business consultant and candidate for U.S. House in 2008
- Liana Hofschneider, indigenous activist
- James Rayphand, former director of the Office of Vocational Rehabilitation

=== Declined ===
- Edith DeLeon Guerrero, president of the Northern Mariana Islands Senate (running for re-election)
- Juan Lizama, retired judge and candidate for U.S. House in 2008

== Results ==
2024 United States House of Representatives election in Northern Mariana Islands
Party	Candidate	Votes	%
Republican	Kimberlyn Kay King-Hinds	4,931	40.34%
Democratic	Edwin Kenneth Propst	4,067	33.27%
Independent	John Oliver Delos Reyes Gonzales	2,282	18.67%
Independent	James Michael Rayphand	665	5.44%
Independent	Liana Sablan Hofschneider	280	2.29%
Total votes		12,225	100.0%
Republican gain from Democratic			
