= 2016 United States House of Representatives election in Northern Mariana Islands =

2016 United States House of Representatives election in the Northern Mariana Islands
- November 8, 2016
Nominee	Gregorio Sablan
Party	Independent
Popular vote	10,605
Percentage	100.0%
Delegate before election
Gregorio Sablan
Independent
Elected Delegate
Gregorio Sablan
Independent

The 2016 congressional election in the Northern Mariana Islands was held on Tuesday, November 8, 2016, to elect the territory's sole Delegate to the United States House of Representatives.

Incumbent Delegate Gregorio Sablan, an independent who caucuses with the Democratic Party, ran unopposed for re-election. Sablan, first elected in 2008, had held the seat since its creation in 2009.

The Northern Mariana Islands' non-voting delegate to the U.S. House of Representatives was elected for a two-year term. The election coincided with the elections of other federal and state offices, including the 2016 Northern Mariana Islands general election, as well as the nationwide 2016 United States House of Representatives elections and the 2016 United States general elections.

== Candidates ==
=== Independent ===
- Gregorio Sablan, incumbent Delegate for Northern Mariana Islands' at-large congressional district since 2009

== General election ==
Sablan, who ran unopposed, won the November 2016 election.

Northern Mariana Islands' at-large district
Party	Candidate	Votes	%	±%
Independent	Gregorio Kilili Camacho Sablan (incumbent)	10,605	100.00%	+34.70%
Total votes		10,605	100.00%	
Independent hold				

== See also ==
- 2016 United States House of Representatives elections
- 2016 Northern Mariana Islands general election
