= 2012 Northern Mariana Islands constitutional referendum =

Ballot measure in the Northern Mariana Islands

Northern Mariana Islands constitutional referendum, 2012
November 6, 2012; 12 years ago
- Voting system: simple majority

Initiative 17-5
Yes	62.35%
No	37.65%

Initiative 17-12, HD1
Yes	88.38%
No	11.62%

Initiative 17-2, HD3, HS2
Yes	81.63%
No	18.37%

A constitutional referendum was held in the Northern Mariana Islands on 6 November 2012, alongside the election for the islands' representative to the United States House of Representatives. Voters were asked whether they approved of three proposed amendments to the constitution. All three were approved.

== Background ==
One of the three proposals was for the government to issue bonds to pay for the country's pension scheme, a proposal which had been rejected in a 2010 referendum. It would involve adding a new section to chapter X of the constitution:

Pension Obligation Bonds. Upon the affirmative vote of two-thirds of the members of each house of the Legislature, the Commonwealth may issue pension obligation bonds, the cumulative amount of which shall not exceed the Commonwealth's actuarilly determined unfunded accrued liability to the Retirement Fund. The net proceeds of each bond issuance shall be deposited and invested along with other monies in a defined benefit plan trust fund administered by the Northern Mariana Islands Retirement Fund. The bonds issued under this section shall comply with Section 3 of this Article and shall be exempt from Section 4 of this Article.

The second amendment was to allow the Board of Regents to revise the mission statement of the Northern Marianas College, which would involve amending Section 2 (b) of Article XV.

The third amendment involved making the Attorney General an elected position, which would require amending Article III, section 11 of the constitution.

== Results ==
Do you approve of House Legislative Initiative 17-5 to add a new Section 10 to Article X of the Constitution of the Northern Mariana Islands to authorize the Commonwealth to issue pension obligation bonds and for other purposes?

Choice	Votes	%
For	6,876	62.35
Against	4,152	37.65
Invalid/blank votes	1,571	–
Total	12,599	100
Registered voters/turnout	16,771	75.12
Source: Direct Democracy

Do you approve of Senate Legislative Initiative 17-12, HD1 to amend Section 2 (b) of Article XV 11 of the Constitution of the Northern Mariana Islands to authorize the Board of Regents to revise the mission statement of the Northern Marianas College?

Choice	Votes	%
For	10,084	88.38
Against	1,326	11.62
Invalid/blank votes	1,180	–
Total	12,599	100
Registered voters/turnout	16,771	75.12
Source: Direct Democracy

Do you approve of House Legislative Initiative 17-2, HD3, HS2 to amend Article III, Section 11 of the Constitution of the Northern Mariana Islands to authorize the election of an Attorney General?

Choice	Votes	%
For	9,248	81.63
Against	2,081	18.37
Invalid/blank votes	1,270	–
Total	12,599	100
Registered voters/turnout	16,771	75.12
Source: Direct Democracy
