= 2012 United States House of Representatives election in Northern Mariana Islands =

2012 United States House of Representatives election in the Northern Mariana Islands
- November 6, 2012
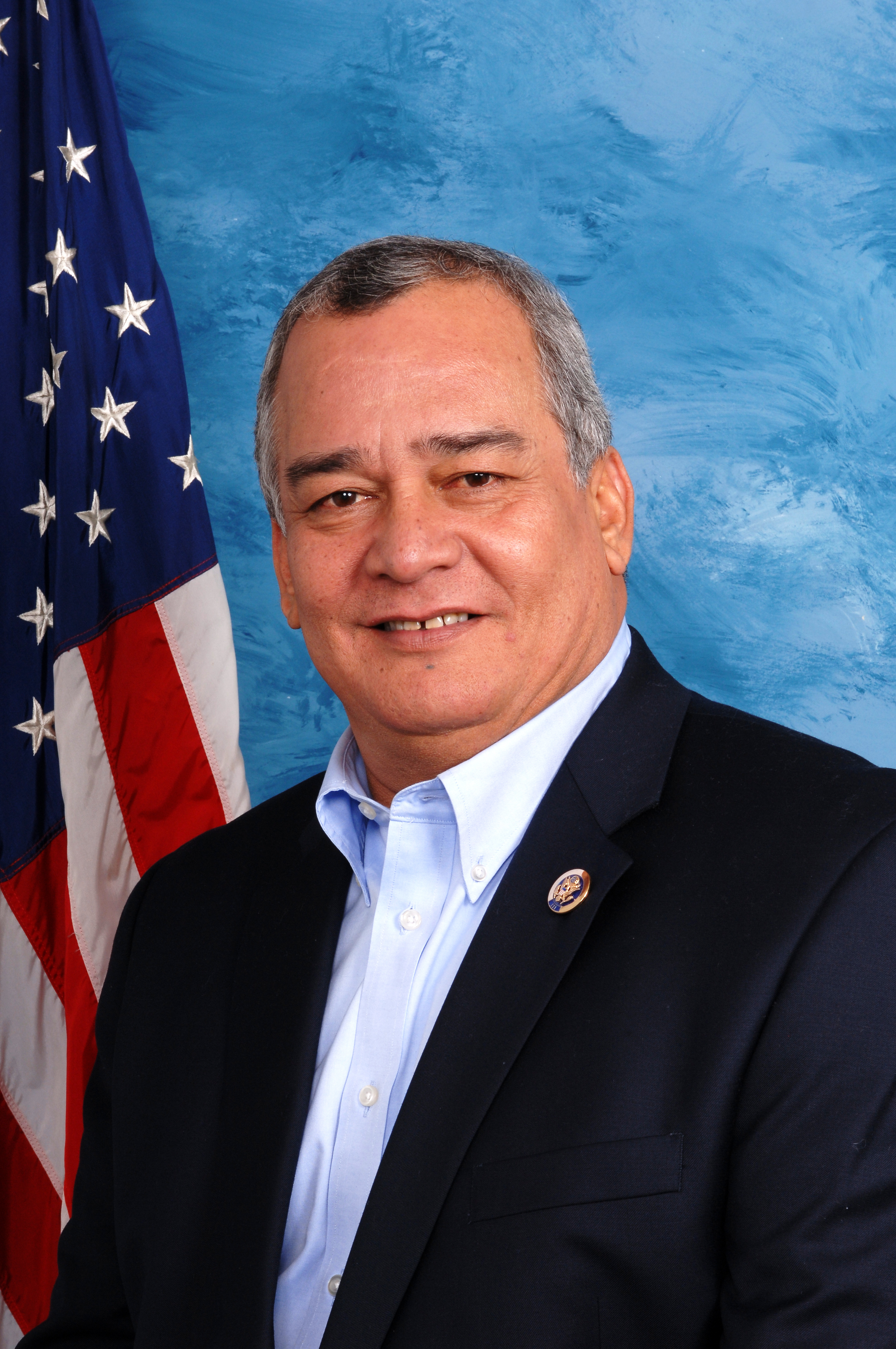

Nominee	Gregorio Sablan	Ignacia Demapan
Party	Independent	Republican
Popular vote	9,829	2,503
Percentage	79.7%	20.3%
- Results by voting district: Gregorio Sablan: 70–75% 75–80% 80–85% 85–90% >95%
Delegate before election
Gregorio Sablan
Independent
Elected Delegate
Gregorio Sablan
Independent

The 2012 Congressional election in the Northern Mariana Islands was held on November 6, 2012 to elect the territory's sole Delegate to the United States House of Representatives. Representatives and non-voting Delegates are elected for two-year terms.

Delegate Gregorio Sablan, an independent who caucuses with the Democratic Party, has held the seat since its creation in 2008. Sablan won re-election in the 2008 four-person race with 43%, or 4,896 of the 11,325 total votes cast. He is the first non-voting delegate to represent the Northern Mariana Islands in the U.S. House of Representatives.

Sablan launched his re-election campaign for a third term on August 24, 2011.

Republican Party leaders in the Northern Mariana Islands, including Governor Benigno Fitial, had reportedly encouraged John Gonzales to run against Sablan in the race. Gonzales, a former Covenant Party member and the executive director of the Northern Mariana Islands public library system, previously finished in 3rd place in the 2008 United States House of Representatives election in the Northern Mariana Islands.

== Candidates ==
- Gregorio Sablan (independent), incumbent Delegate
- Ignacia Tudela "Acha" Demapan (Republican), elementary school principal

=== General election results ===
Incumbent Del. Gregorio "Kilili" Sablan won a landslide re-election, earning more than 7,000 votes more than his Republican challenger, Dr. Ignacia "Acha" Demapan, the largest vote margin of any political candidate in Northern Mariana Islands history.

Northern Mariana Islands's at-large congressional district
Party	Candidate	Votes	%	±%
Independent	Gregorio Kilili Camacho Sablan (incumbent)	9,829	79.70%	+36.47%
Republican	Ignacia Tudela Demapan	2,503	20.30%	N/A
Total votes		12,332	100.00%	
Independent hold				

== See also ==
- United States House of Representatives election in the Northern Mariana Islands, 2010
