= 2022 Northern Mariana Islands gubernatorial election =

- November 8, 2022 (first round); November 25, 2022 (runoff)
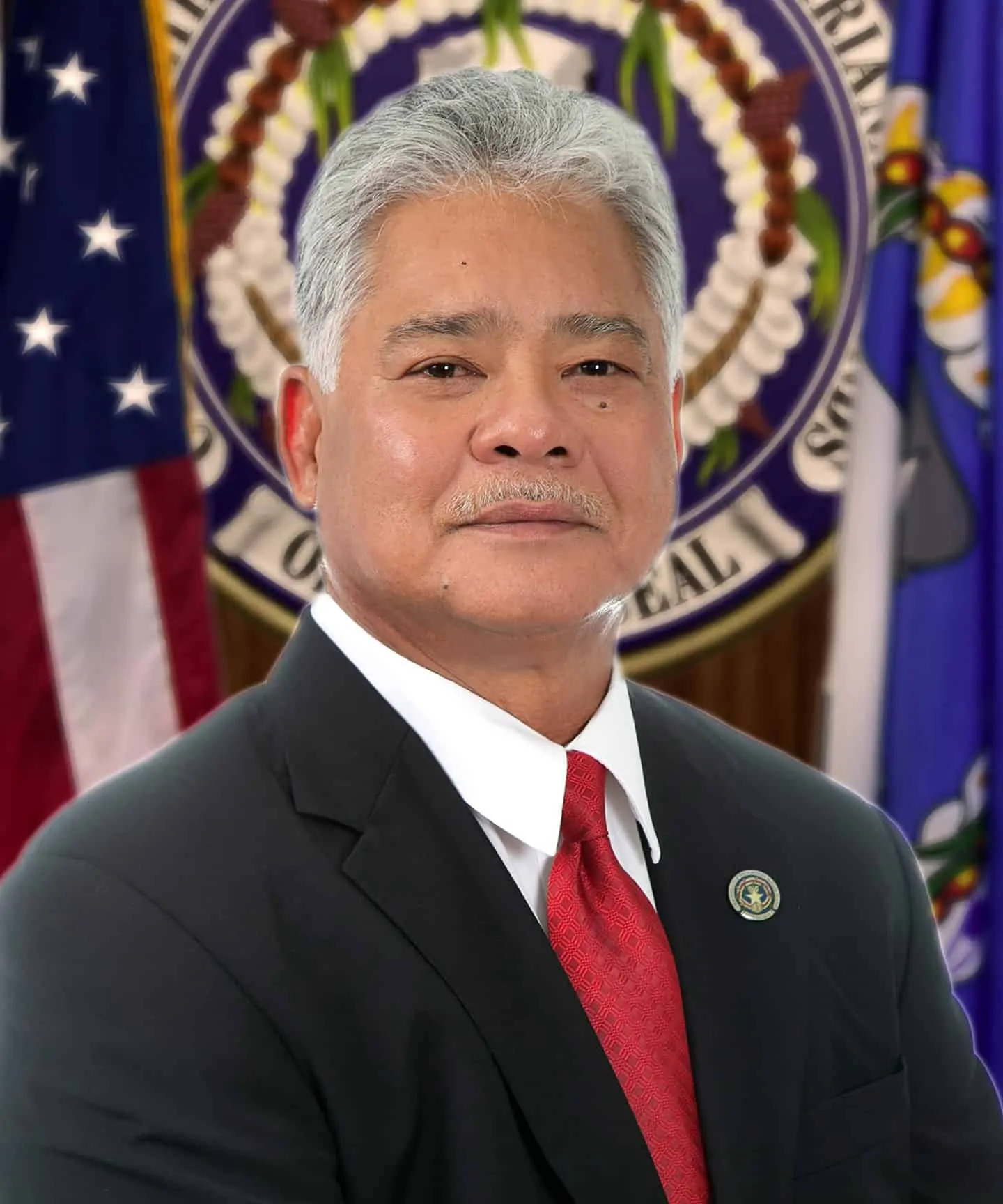

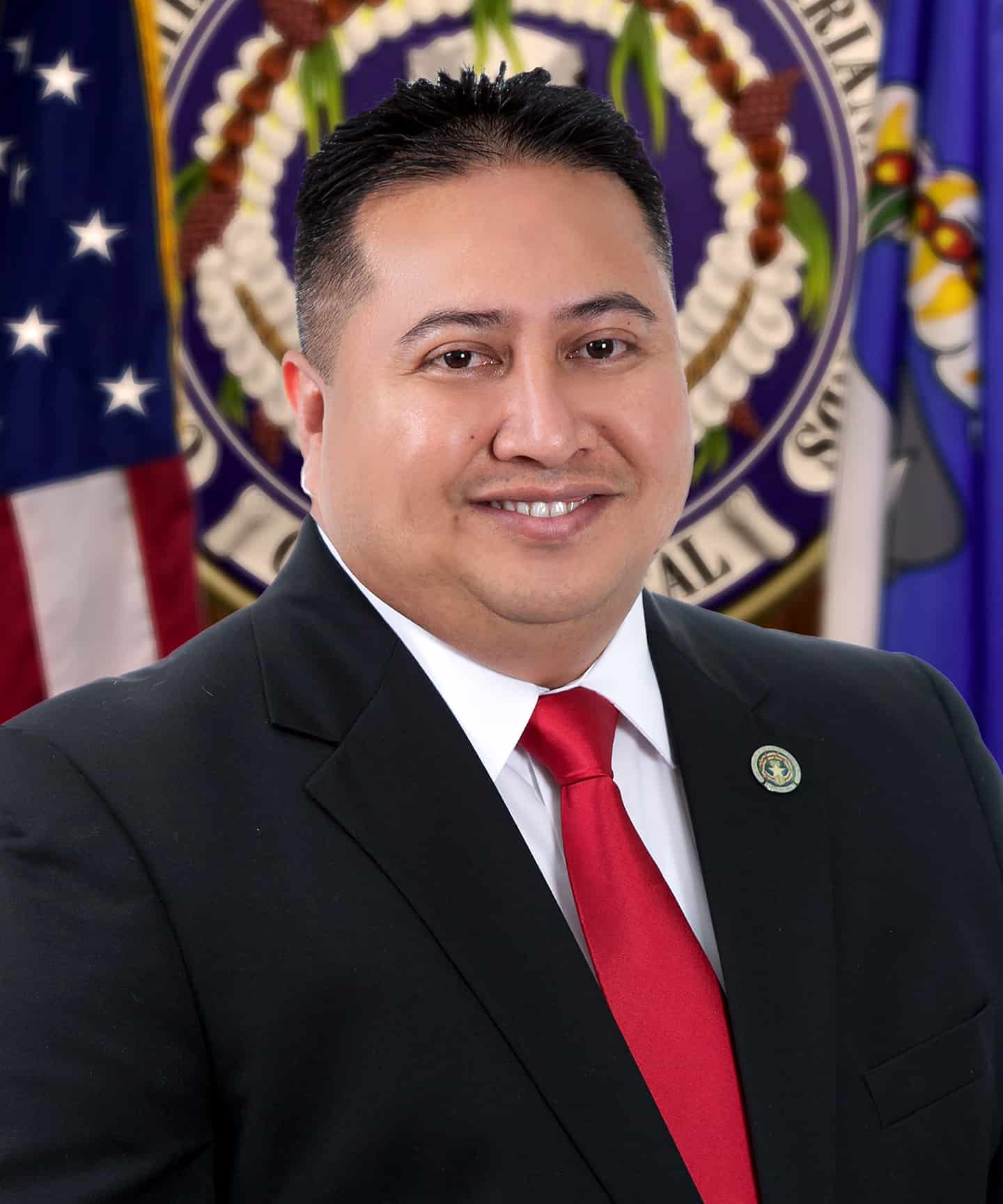
Nominee	Arnold Palacios	Ralph Torres
Party	Independent	Republican
Running mate	David Apatang	Vinnie Sablan
Popular vote	7,394	6,263
Percentage	54.14%	45.86%
- Results by voting district: Arnold Palacios: 50–55% 60–65% 65–70% Ralph Torres: 50–55% 65–70% 70–75%
Governor before election
Ralph Torres
Republican
Elected Governor
Arnold Palacios
Independent

The 2022 Northern Mariana gubernatorial election took place on November 8, 2022, to elect the governor of the Northern Mariana Islands and the lieutenant governor of the Northern Mariana Islands to a four-year term in office. Because no candidate received 50% of the vote in the general election, the two highest-placing candidates advanced to a runoff election on November 25, 2022.

Incumbent Republican governor Ralph Torres ran for re-election to a second full term in office with territorial senator Vinnie Sablan as his running mate. Lieutenant Governor Arnold Palacios, a career Republican, also contested the seat, running as an independent with Saipan mayor David Apatang as his running mate. Democratic nominee Tina Sablan, a member of the Northern Mariana Islands House of Representatives, is the first woman to be nominated for Governor of the Northern Mariana Islands. She chose fellow territorial representative Leila Staffler as her running mate.

In the general election, Torres came in first with 38.83% of the vote, followed by Palacios at 33.15% and Sablan at 28.01%. Because no candidate received more than 50% of the vote, a runoff between Torres and Palacios was held on November 25, 2022. Sablan and Staffler endorsed Palacios in the runoff, and Palacios and Apatang signed a "unity pledge" with them promising action on several policy issues, including health care, labor, and infrastructure.

Palacios and Apatang won the runoff election with 54.14% of the vote to 45.86% for Torres and Sablan. Palacios was the first independent elected governor of the Northern Mariana Islands, and the first independent to win a gubernatorial election in any U.S. state or territory since 2014. (Note: In 2014, Bill Walker was elected Governor of Alaska and Kenneth Mapp was elected Governor of the U.S. Virgin Islands.)

== Background ==
Torres has been under investigation for misusing public funds since 2019. On January 12, 2022, the Northern Mariana Islands House of Representatives voted to impeach Torres on charges of theft and corruption. A two-thirds majority vote in the Northern Mariana Islands Senate was required to remove the governor from office. The Senate acquitted Torres on May 18 in a 3–4 party-line vote with two senators absent. However, Torres still faced criminal charges brought against him by Attorney General Edward Manibusan. His trial was set for July 5, 2022, but was delayed several times and will not take place until after the November election. Manibusan was reelected in the 2022 election.

== Candidates ==
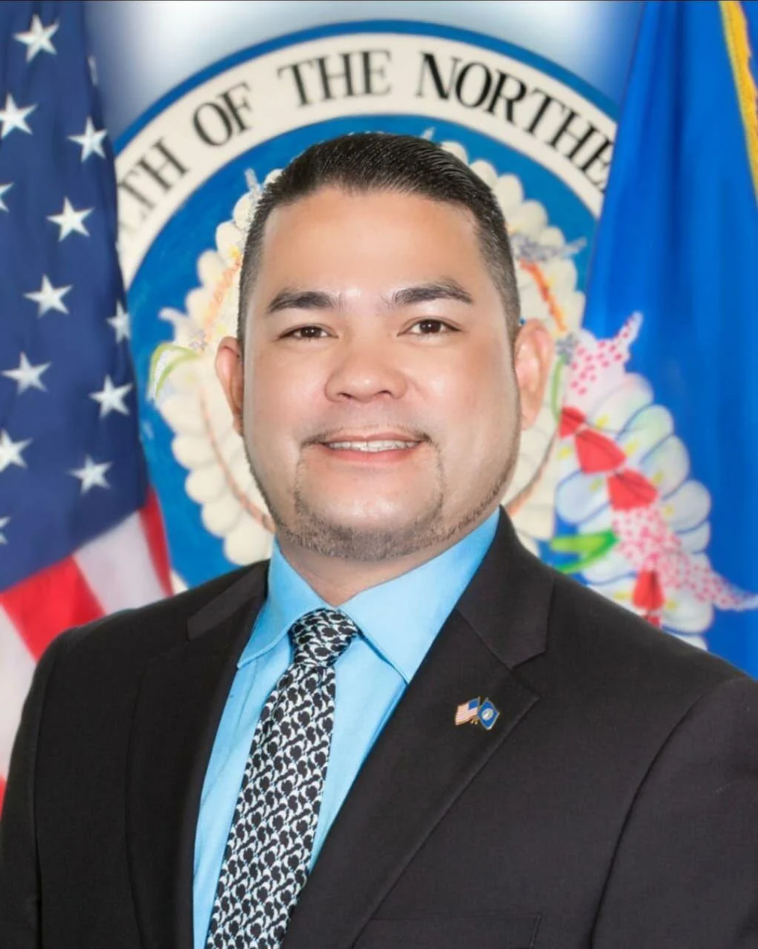
Vinnie Sablan

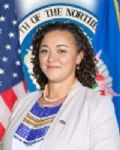
Leila Staffler

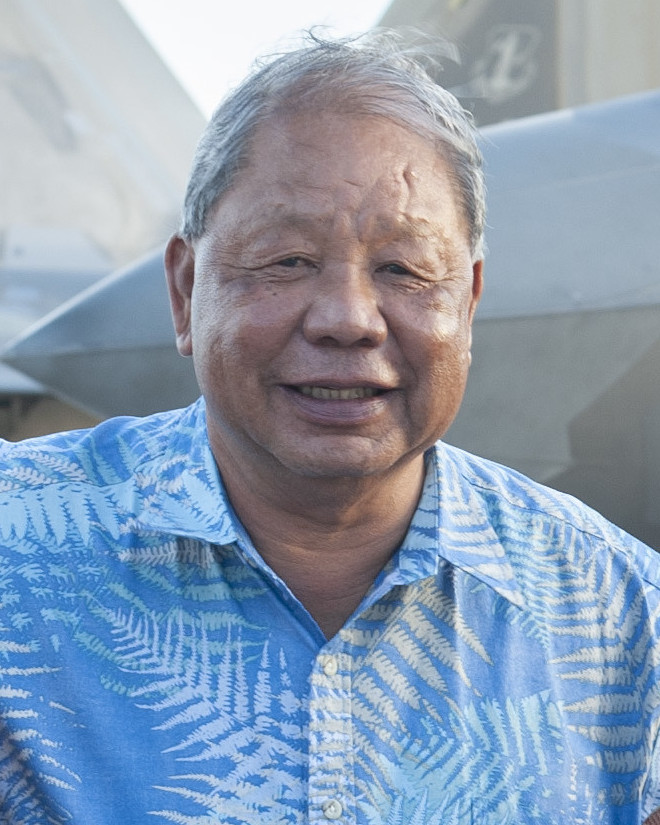
David Apatang

=== Republican Party ===
==== Declared ====
- Ralph Torres, incumbent governor
  - Running mate: Vinnie Sablan, floor leader of the Northern Mariana Islands Senate

==== Declined ====
- Arnold Palacios, Lieutenant Governor of the Northern Mariana Islands (running as an independent)

=== Democratic Party ===
==== Declared ====
- Tina Sablan, territorial representative (endorsed by party)
  - Running mate: Leila Staffler, territorial representative

==== Declined ====
- Edith Deleon Guerrero, territorial senator

=== Independents ===
On October 22, 2021, Palacios and Apatang announced they were leaving the Republican Party and would run as an independent ticket.

==== Declared ====
- Arnold Palacios, Lieutenant Governor of the Northern Mariana Islands
  - Running mate: David Apatang, mayor of Saipan and former territorial representative

==== Declined ====
- Gregorio Sablan, Delegate to the U.S. House of Representatives (running for re-election, endorsed Tina Sablan)

== Endorsements ==
Tina Sablan (D)

Politicians

- Gregorio Sablan, Delegate to the U.S. House of Representatives (2009–present)

Organizations

- Democratic Party of the Northern Mariana Islands
Arnold Palacios (I)

Territory-wide officials

- Juan Babauta, former governor (2002–2006)
- Benigno Fitial, former governor (2006–2013) (Covenant/Republican)

Territorial legislators

- Blas Jonathan Attao, vice speaker of the Northern Mariana Islands House of Representatives (Republican)
- Jesus Attao, former territorial representative
- Oscar Babauta, former speaker of the Northern Mariana Islands House of Representatives
- Roman Benavente, former territorial representative
- Pedro Deleon Guerrero, former speaker of the Northern Mariana Islands House of Representatives
- Janet Maratita, former territorial representative
- Clyde Norita, former territorial representative
- John Reyes, former territorial representative
- John Paul Sablan, territorial representative (Republican)
- John Tenorio, former territorial senator
- Ralph N. Yumul, floor leader of the Northern Mariana Islands House of Representatives (Republican)

Commonwealth Ports Authority board members

- Pete P. Reyes
- Thomas Villagomez

Local politicians

- Marianne Tudela, former mayor of Saipan

== Results ==
Northern Mariana Islands gubernatorial election
Party	Candidate	Running mate	First round		Second round	
Party	Candidate	Running mate	Votes	%	Votes	%
Independent	Arnold Palacios	David Apatang	4,890	33.15%	7,394	54.14%
Republican	Ralph Torres (incumbent)	Vinnie Sablan	5,728	38.83%	6,263	45.86%
Democratic	Tina Sablan	Leila Staffler	4,132	28.01%		
Total			14,750	100%	13,657	100%
Independent gain from Republican						
