= Blas T. Attao =

Northern Mariana Islander politician

Blas Attao
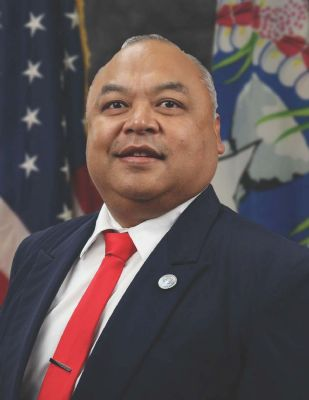

Speaker of the Northern Mariana Islands House of Representatives
- In office January 14, 2019 – January 10, 2021
- Preceded by: Rafael Demapan
- Succeeded by: Edmund Villagomez

Member of the Northern Mariana Islands House of Representatives from the 3rd district
- Incumbent
- Assumed office January 12, 2015

Personal details
- Born: Blas Jonathan Tenorio Attao
- Party: Independent (before 2018, 2022–present); Republican (2018–2022)
- Education: Boise State University (BA)

Blas Jonathan Tenorio Attao is a Northern Mariana Islander politician. He serves as a member for the 3rd district of the Northern Mariana Islands House of Representatives. He first took office January 12, 2015. He is an independent candidate for Governor of the Northern Mariana Islands in the 2026 election.

== Early life and career ==
He attended Boise State University. Attao served as a legislative assistant in the Legislative Bureau during the 15th through 19th Commonwealth Legislatures.

== Political career ==
Attao was elected as an independent candidate in 2014. He was reelected in 2016, 2022, and 2024 as an independent, while winning reelection on the Republican ticket in 2018 and 2020. At the start of the 21st Commonwealth Legislature, Attao was unanimously elected the Speaker of the House. During this time, Attao oversaw the creation of the first bipartisan ethics commission. In the 22nd Commonwealth Legislature, Attao did not run for reelection as Speaker and nominated Edmund Villagomez for the position. After a contentious election for Speaker, Attao was elected unanimously to serve as Vice Speaker.

In July 2025, he announced his campaign for Governor of the Northern Mariana Islands in the 2026 election on an independent ticket with his successor as Speaker Edmund Villagomez.

Political offices
Preceded by Rafael Sablan Demapan	Speaker of the Northern Mariana Islands House of Representatives; 2019–2021	Succeeded by Edmund Villagomez
Party political offices
Preceded by Tina Sablan	Democratic nominee for Governor of the Northern Mariana Islands; Endorsed; 2026	Most recent
