= 2018 United States House of Representatives election in Northern Mariana Islands =

2018 United States House of Representatives election in the Northern Mariana Islands
- November 13, 2018

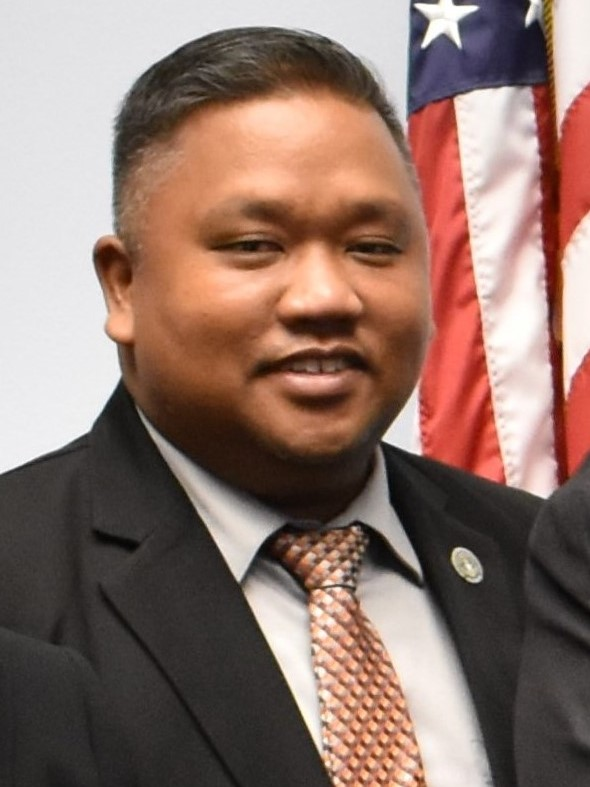
Nominee	Gregorio Sablan	Angel Demapan
Party	Independent	Republican
Popular vote	9,150	5,199
Percentage	63.8%	36.2%
- Results by voting district: Gregorio Sablan: 60–65% 65–70% Angel Demapan: 50–55%
Delegate before election
Gregorio Sablan
Independent
Elected Delegate
Gregorio Sablan
Independent

The 2018 United States House of Representatives election in the Northern Mariana Islands was held on Tuesday, November 13, 2018, to elect the territory's delegate to the United States House of Representatives in the 116th United States Congress. Delegate Gregorio Sablan was re-elected to his sixth term as delegate to the U.S. House of Representatives from the Northern Mariana Islands' at-large district.

The election was originally scheduled for Tuesday, November 6, 2018, to coincide with the 2018 House of Representatives election and the Northern Mariana Islands (CNMI) territorial elections. However, all 2018 elections in the CNMI were postponed until November 13, 2018, due to the impact of Typhoon Yutu, which devastated the Northern Mariana Islands as a Category 5-equivalent super typhoon on October 24, just weeks before the election.

The Northern Mariana Islands' non-voting delegate to the U.S. House of Representatives is elected for a two-year term. Incumbent Delegate Gregorio Sablan, an independent who caucuses with the Democratic Party, successfully sought re-election to a sixth consecutive term. Sablan, who ran unopposed in 2016, defeated Republican Rep. Angel Demapan, a member of the Northern Mariana Islands House of Representatives.

The election coincided with the elections of other federal midterm and Commonwealth offices, including the local Northern Mariana Islands general election and territorial general election, as well as the nationwide 2018 United States House of Representatives elections and the 2016 United States general elections.

== Candidates ==
=== Independent ===
- Gregorio Sablan, incumbent delegate for Northern Mariana Islands' at-large congressional district since January 2009

=== Republican ===
- Angel Demapan, member of the Northern Mariana Islands House of Representatives since January 12, 2015; first elected to the Northern Mariana Islands House of Representatives in the 2014 general election

== Results ==
Incumbent Gregorio Sablan won re-election to his sixth term as delegate, defeating Republican Angel Demapan.

Northern Mariana Islands' at-large district
Party	Candidate	Votes	%	±%
Independent	Gregorio Kilili Camacho Sablan (incumbent)	9,150	63.77%	−36.23%
Republican	Angel Aldan Demapan	5,199	36.23%	N/A
Total votes		14,349	100.00%	
Independent hold				
