= 2020 United States House of Representatives election in Northern Mariana Islands =

2020 United States House of Representatives election in the Northern Mariana Islands
- November 3, 2020
Nominee	Gregorio Sablan
Party	Independent
Popular vote	11,258
Percentage	100.0%
Delegate before election
Gregorio Sablan
Independent
Elected Delegate
Gregorio Sablan
Independent

The 2020 United States House of Representatives election in the Northern Mariana Islands was held on Tuesday, November 3, 2020, to elect the territory's delegate to the United States House of Representatives in the 117th United States Congress. The delegate, who is elected to a two-year term, represents the Northern Mariana Islands' at-large congressional district in the U.S. House of Representatives.

The election coincided with the larger 2020 United States House of Representatives elections and the 2020 Northern Mariana Islands general election.

Incumbent Rep. Gregorio Sablan, an independent who caucuses with the Democratic Party, was unopposed in seeking re-election.

== Race background ==
Gregorio "Kilili" Sablan was first elected in 2008, becoming the first delegate to the United States House of Representatives in the history of the Northern Mariana Islands. He has held the seat since its creation. Sablan ran unopposed in the 2016 election. In 2018, he defeated Republican Angel Demapan with approximately 64% of the vote in the November election.

Sablan filed to run for re-election on August 3, 2020, at the Commonwealth Election Commission office on Saipan. He was the only candidate to contest the 2020 race.

== Candidates ==
=== Independent ===
- Gregorio Sablan, incumbent delegate for Northern Mariana Islands' at-large congressional district since January 2009

== General election ==
Sablan, who ran unopposed, won the November 2020 election.

Northern Mariana Islands's at-large congressional district
Party	Candidate	Votes	%	±%
Independent	Gregorio Kilili Camacho Sablan (incumbent)	11,449	100.00%	+36.23%
Total votes		11,449	100.00%	
Independent hold				
