= Ben Jones (Marianas politician) =

1. REDIRECT 2026 Northern Mariana Islands gubernatorial election
