= Tina Sablan =

Northern Mariana Islands politician

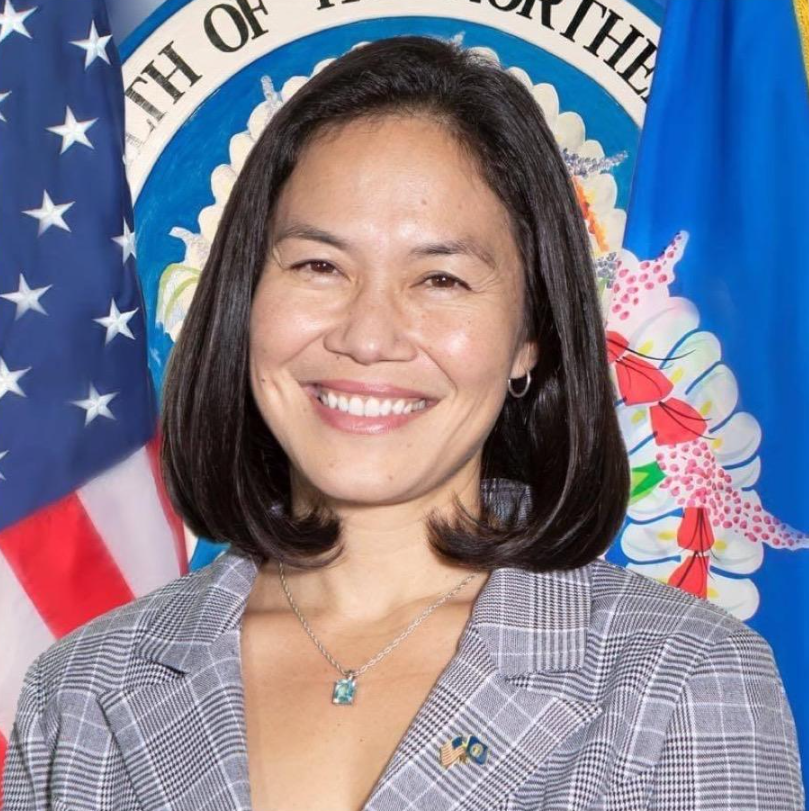
- Sablan during 22nd CNMI Legislature

Member of the Northern Mariana Islands House of Representatives from the 2nd district
- In office January 2019 – January 2023

Member of the Northern Mariana Islands House of Representatives from the 1st district
- In office 2008–2010

Personal details
- Born: Christina-Marie Elise Sablan; May 18, 1981 (age 45)
- Party: Democratic
- Education: College of Santa Fe (BS); University of Hawaiʻi at Mānoa (MUP)

Christina-Marie Elise Sablan (born May 18, 1981), also known as Tina Sablan, is a Northern Marianan politician and former news anchor in the Commonwealth of the Northern Mariana Islands (CNMI). A member of the Democratic Party, Sablan was a member of the Commonwealth House of Representatives, representing Precinct Two.

Sablan was the Democratic Party candidate for CNMI Governor in the 2022 election, where she was the first female nominee from any major party. As of April 15, 2023, Sablan is the Democratic National Committeewoman from the Northern Mariana Islands.

== Early life and education ==
Sablan was born to Eugenio and Carmela Sablan on Saipan on May 18, 1981. She grew up in the communities of Chalan Kanoa and Tanapag. In 2003, Sablan received her bachelor's degree (B.S.) in conservation science from the College of Santa Fe. In 2016, she received a master's degree in urban and regional planning from the University of Hawaiʻi at Mānoa, where she also received a graduate certificate in the Matsunaga Institute for Peace and Conflict Resolution https://sci.manoa.hawaii.edu/programs/matsunaga-institute-for-peace/.

== Activism and journalism career ==
Sablan rose to local prominence from 2005 to 2007 as a key leader in the "Beautify CNMI coalition", which organized islandwide cleanups. Sablan served within the Northern Mariana Islands' Division of Environmental Quality (DEQ) as a waste reduction and recycling coordinator. She was named "Person of the Year" for her activism in 2007 by the Saipan Tribune.

In the realm of journalism, Sablan worked as a news reporter and anchor for KSPN2. Additionally, Sablan served as program manager of the Commonwealth Cancer Association, an anti-cancer group.

== Commonwealth legislature ==
=== 16th Legislature ===
In 2007, Sablan was elected to the House of Representatives for the 16th Legislature, which made her the youngest member of the legislature at the time. Sablan edged out independent candidate Janet Maratita for the last of the six seats in Precinct One. However, she was defeated when she ran for Commonwealth Senate in 2009. After this defeat, Sablan joined the staff of territorial delegate Gregorio Sablan, serving as his deputy communications director and outreach coordinator.

=== 21st and 22nd Legislature ===
In 2018, she returned to the House of Representatives as one of two representatives for Precinct Two, and was reelected in 2020. Saban is a supporter of expanding eligibility for the earned income tax credit (EITC), and introduced legislation to repeal NMI Public Law 11-25 (1998), which limited the EITC. A supporter of LGBT rights, Sablan introduced anti-discrimination legislation to add protections for gender identity and sexual orientation in housing, healthcare, and employment.

As a territorial representative, she was appointed by the federal Environmental Protection Agency (EPA) to serve on the agency's Small Communities Advisory Subcommittee. In the 22nd Commonwealth Legislature, Sablan served as Chair of the House Committee on Health and Welfare in the Commonwealth House of Representatives. In this capacity, she testified before the United States Congress about the need to end racial disparities in healthcare.

== 2022 gubernatorial candidacy ==
As early as 2008 during her first term in the territorial legislature, Sablan was speculated on as a possible future gubernatorial candidate. Sablan was a gubernatorial candidate in the 2022 election, where she faced incumbent Republican governor Ralph Torres and Independent candidate Arnold Palacios. Her candidacy was endorsed by the territorial Democratic Party, and additionally received the support of territorial delegate Gregorio Sablan. In the November election, Sablan finished in third place with 28% of the vote. In the runoff election Sablan endorsed Arnold Palacios over incumbent governor Ralph Torres.

== Governor's advisor ==
After Palacios won the runoff election, Sablan joined his administration as a pro-bono senior policy advisor. Sablan resigned as the Governor's special policy advisor and special assistant for climate policy and planning effective December 27, 2025.

== Personal life ==
Sablan is a resident of Susupe, a village in Saipan.

Party political offices
Preceded by Juan Babauta; Endorsed	Democratic nominee for Governor of the Northern Mariana Islands; 2022	Succeeded by Blas T. Attao; Endorsed
