= Northern Mariana Islands' at-large congressional district =

At-large U.S. House district for the Northern Mariana Islands

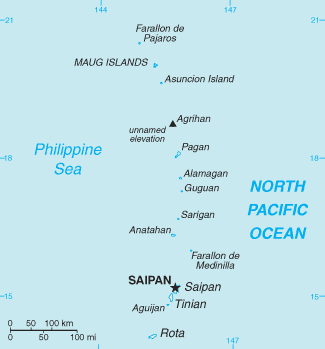
- Delegate: Kimberlyn King-Hinds; R–Tinian
- Area: 179 mi^{2} (460 km^{2})
- Population (2010): 53,883
- Ethnicity: 77.9% other; 22.1% Asian; 0.0% Native American; 0.0% Black; 0.0% Hispanic; 0.0% White

The Northern Mariana Islands' at-large congressional district encompasses the entire U.S. Commonwealth of the Northern Mariana Islands (CNMI). The Commonwealth does not have a voting member of Congress, but does elect a delegate who can participate in debates with the United States House of Representatives. On November 4, 2008, the first delegate was elected to the 111th United States Congress which began on January 3, 2009.

== Establishment and history ==
From 1978 to 2009, in accordance with the Commonwealth's Constitution, the Northern Mariana Islands elected a Resident Representative in Washington, D.C. who was not considered an official member of Congress. They served two-year terms until 1990, when the terms were increased to four years.

Pursuant to Pub. L. 110–229 (text) (PDF), the Northern Mariana Islands first elected a non-voting delegate to Congress in 2008, replacing the Resident Representative. Among nine candidates, independent candidate Gregorio Sablan won the election with 24% of the votes, and incumbent Resident Representative Pedro Agulto Tenorio (Republican) came in second with 21%. Sablan won re-election six times as an independent, but announced in 2021 that he would run as a Democrat for the 2022 election.

== List of resident representatives ==
Resident representatives of the Northern Mariana Islands
Name	Party	Start	End
Edward Pangelinan	Democratic	1978	1984
Edward Pangelinan	Republican	1978	1984
Froilan Tenorio	Democratic	1984	1990
Juan Babauta	Republican	1990	2002
Pete Tenorio	Republican	2002	2009

== List of delegates representing the district ==
Delegates from the Northern Mariana Islands
Delegate	Party	Term	Congress	Electoral history
District established January 3, 2009
Gregorio Sablan (Saipan)	Independent	January 3, 2009 – October 24, 2021	111th 112th 113th 114th 115th 116th 117th 118th	Elected in 2008. Re-elected in 2010. Re-elected in 2012. Re-elected in 2014. Re-elected in 2016. Re-elected in 2018. Re-elected in 2020. Re-elected in 2022. Retired.
Gregorio Sablan (Saipan)	Democratic	October 25, 2021 – January 3, 2025	111th 112th 113th 114th 115th 116th 117th 118th	Elected in 2008. Re-elected in 2010. Re-elected in 2012. Re-elected in 2014. Re-elected in 2016. Re-elected in 2018. Re-elected in 2020. Re-elected in 2022. Retired.
Kimberlyn King-Hinds (Tinian)	Republican	January 3, 2025 – present	119th	Elected in 2024. Re-elected in 2026.

== Election results ==
=== 2008 ===
Northern Mariana Islands' at-large congressional district election, 2008
Party	Candidate	Votes	%
Independent	Gregorio Kilili Camacho Sablan	2,474	24.35%
Republican	Pedro Agulto Tenorio	2,117	20.83%
Independent	John Oliver Delos Santos Gonzales	1,855	18.26%
Independent	Juan Tudela Lizama	1,819	17.90%
Independent	Luis Palacios Crisostimo	946	9.31%
Democratic	David Mendiola Cing	307	3.02%
Independent	Felipe Quitugua Atalig	249	2.45%
Independent	Chong Man Won	230	2.26%
Independent	John Henry Jr. Davis	164	1.61%
Invalid or blank votes			
Total votes		10,161	100.00%
Independent win (new seat)			

=== 2010 ===
Northern Mariana Islands' at-large congressional district, 2010
Party	Candidate	Votes	%
Independent	Gregorio Kilili Camacho Sablan (incumbent)	4,896	43.23%
Covenant	Joseph James Norita Camacho	2,744	24.23%
Republican	Juan Nekai Babauta	1,978	17.47%
Democratic	Jesus "Jesse" Camacho Borja	1,707	15.07%
Total votes		11,325	100.00
Independent hold			

=== 2012 ===
Northern Mariana Islands' at-large congressional district, 2012
Party	Candidate	Votes	%	±%
Independent	Gregorio Kilili Camacho Sablan (incumbent)	9,829	79.70%	+36.47%
Republican	Ignacia Tudela Demapan	2,503	20.30%	N/A
Total votes		12,332	100.00%	
Independent hold				

=== 2014 ===
Northern Mariana Islands' at-large congressional district, 2014
Party	Candidate	Votes	%	±%
Independent	Gregorio Kilili Camacho Sablan (incumbent)	8,549	65.28%	−14.42%
Democratic	Andrew Sablan Salas	4,547	34.72%	N/A
Total votes		13,096	100.00%	
Independent hold				

=== 2016 ===
Northern Mariana Islands' at-large congressional district, 2016
Party	Candidate	Votes	%	±%
Independent	Gregorio Kilili Camacho Sablan (incumbent)	10,605	100.00%	+34.70%
Total votes		10,605	100.00%	
Independent hold				

=== 2018 ===
Northern Mariana Islands' at-large congressional district, 2018
Party	Candidate	Votes	%	±%
Independent	Gregorio Kilili Camacho Sablan (incumbent)	9,150	63.77%	−36.23%
Republican	Angel Aldan Demapan	5,199	36.23%	N/A
Total votes		14,349	100.00%	
Independent hold				

=== 2020 ===
Northern Mariana Islands' at-large congressional district, 2020
Party	Candidate	Votes	%	±%
Independent	Gregorio Kilili Camacho Sablan (incumbent)	11,449	100.00%	+36.23%
Total votes		11,449	100.00%	
Independent hold				

=== 2022 ===
Northern Mariana Islands' at-large congressional district, 2022
Party	Candidate	Votes	%
Democratic	Gregorio Kilili Camacho Sablan (incumbent)	12,315	100.00%
Total votes		12,315	100.00%
Democratic gain from Independent			

=== 2024 ===
Northern Mariana Islands' at-large congressional district, 2024
Party	Candidate	Votes	%
Republican	Kimberlyn King-Hinds	4,931	40.34%
Democratic	Ed Propst	4,067	33.27%
Independent	John Oliver Delos Reyes Gonzales	2,282	18.67%
Independent	James Michael Rayphand	665	5.44%
Independent	Liana Sablan Hofschneider	280	2.29%
Total votes		12,225	100.0%
Republican gain from Democratic			
