= 2022 United States House of Representatives election in Northern Mariana Islands =

2022 United States House of Representatives election in the Northern Mariana Islands
- November 8, 2022
Nominee	Gregorio Sablan
Party	Democratic
Popular vote	12,315
Percentage	100.0%
Delegate before election
Gregorio Sablan
Independent
Elected Delegate
Gregorio Sablan
Democratic

The 2022 United States House of Representatives election in the Northern Mariana Islands was held on Tuesday, November 8, 2022, to elect the territory's delegate to the United States House of Representatives in the 118th United States Congress. The delegate, who is elected to a two-year term, represents the Northern Mariana Islands' at-large congressional district in the U.S. House of Representatives.

The election coincided with the larger 2022 United States House of Representatives elections and the 2022 Northern Mariana Islands general election.

Incumbent Rep. Gregorio Sablan, previously an independent who caucused with the Democratic Party, ran for re-election as the Democratic nominee for the first time in his career.

== Race background ==
Gregorio "Kilili" Sablan was first elected in 2008, becoming the first delegate to the United States House of Representatives in the history of the Northern Mariana Islands. He had held the seat since its creation. In 2020, Sablan was re-elected unopposed in the November election.

== Candidates ==
=== Democratic ===
==== Declared ====
- Gregorio Sablan, incumbent delegate for Northern Mariana Islands' at-large congressional district since January 2009

== Results ==
Northern Mariana Islands's at-large congressional district
Party	Candidate	Votes	%
Democratic	Gregorio Kilili Camacho Sablan (incumbent)	12,315	100.00%
Total votes		12,315	100.00%
Democratic gain from Independent			
