= Rafael Demapan =

Northern Mariana Islander politician (born 1968)

Rafael Sablan Demapan (born August 23, 1968) is a Northern Mariana Islander politician who served in the Northern Mariana Islands House of Representatives from January 10, 2010, to January 2019.

== Early life and career ==
Rafael Sablan Demapan was born August 23, 1968.

== Political career ==
Demapan was elected in the 2009 election to the Northern Mariana Islands House of Representatives as a candidate of the Covenant Party. He was sworn in on January 10, 2010.

After the dissolution of the Covenant Party, Demapan was successfully reelected as a Republican in the 2014 election.

At the start of the 19th Commonwealth Legislature, Demapan was elected Vice Speaker over Roman C. Benavente with 11 votes to Benavente's 9 votes. During this session, he was elevated to speakership in a "shared speakership" arrangement with Joseph Pinaula Deleon Guerrero. Demapan retained the position of Speaker in the 20th Commonwealth Legislature. In 2018, he was an unsuccessful candidate for reelection with independent candidate Tina Sablan and fellow Republican incumbent John P. Sablan winning the two seats.
