= 2010 Northern Mariana Islands constitutional referendum =

Ballot measure in the Northern Mariana Islands

A constitutional referendum was held in the Northern Mariana Islands on 2 November 2010, alongside the election for the islands' representative to the United States House of Representatives. Voters were asked whether they approved of three proposed amendments to the constitution. All three were rejected.

== Background ==
One of the three proposals was for the government to issue bonds to pay for the country's pension scheme. It would involve adding a new section to chapter X of the constitution:

Section 10: Pension Obligation Bonds. Upon the affirmative vote of two-thirds of the members of each house of the Legislature, the Commonwealth may issue pension obligation bonds, the cumulative mount of which shall not exceed the Commonwealth's acturially determined unfunded accrued liability to the Retirement Fund. The net proceeds of each bond issuance shall be deposited and inversted along with other monies in a defined benefit plan trust fund administered by the Northern Mariana Island Retirement Fund. The bond issued under this section shall comply with Section 3 of this Article and shell be exempt from Section 4 of this Article.

The second amendment was to set in law the financing of compensation paid to residents for land expropriation. This would involve amending subsection g of section 5 (Chapter XI) of the constitution:

Original text	Proposed text
The corporation shall receive all moneys from the public lands except those from lands in which freehold interest has been transferred to another agency of government pursuant to section 5(b), and shall transfer these moneys after the end of the fiscal year to the Marianas Public Land Trust except that the corporation shall retain the amount necessary to meet reasonable expenses of administration and management, land surveying, homestead development, and any other expenses reasonably necessary for the accomplishment of its functions. The annual budget of the corporation shall be submitted to the legislature for information purposes only.	The corporation shall receive all moneys from the public lands except those from lands in which freehold interest has been transferred to another agency of government pursuant to section 5(b), and shall transfer these moneys after the end of the fiscal year to the Marianas Public Land Trust except that the corporation shall retain the amount necessary to meet reasonable expenses of administration and management, land surveying, homestead development, and any other expenses reasonably necessary for the accomplishment of its functions; provided further that the corporation shall be authorized to expend up to twenty percent of its revenue to pay and satisfy land compensation claims as provided by law. The annual budget of the corporation shall be submitted to the legislature for information purposes only.

The third amendment concerned limiting a rise in pension payments to the level of secured financing. It proposed adding a new subsection c to Chapter III, section of the constitution:

The Legislature shall not increase benefits until all government obligations to the retirement system have been satisfied or the system is fully funded. Provided further that no law shall be enacted by the Legislature that will create an unfunded liability to the Retirement system.

== Results ==
Do you approve of House Legislative Initiative 17-1 to add a new Section 10 to Article X of the Constitution of the Commonwealth of the Northern Mariana Islands to authorize the Commonwealth to issue pension obligation bonds and for other purposes?

Choice	Votes	%
For	3,376	43.42
Against	4,400	56.58
Invalid/blank votes		–
Total	7,776	100
Registered voters/turnout	16,477	
Source: Direct Democracy

Do you approve of House Legislative Initiative 16-18 to amend Article XI, Section 5(g) of the NMI Constitution to authorize the Department of Public Lands to use up to twenty percent of its revenue to pay and satisfy land compensation claims; and for other purposes?

Choice	Votes	%
For	3,228	43.22
Against	4,472	56.78
Invalid/blank votes		–
Total	7,700	100
Registered voters/turnout	16,477	
Source: Direct Democracy

Do you approve of House Legislative Initiative 16-13 to amend Article III, Section 20 of the Constitution of the Northern Mariana Islands?

Choice	Votes	%
For	3,716	48.43
Against	3,957	51.57
Invalid/blank votes		–
Total	7,673	100
Registered voters/turnout	16,477	
Source: Direct Democracy
