= 2008 United States House of Representatives election in Northern Mariana Islands =

2008 United States House of Representatives election in the Northern Mariana Islands
- November 4, 2008
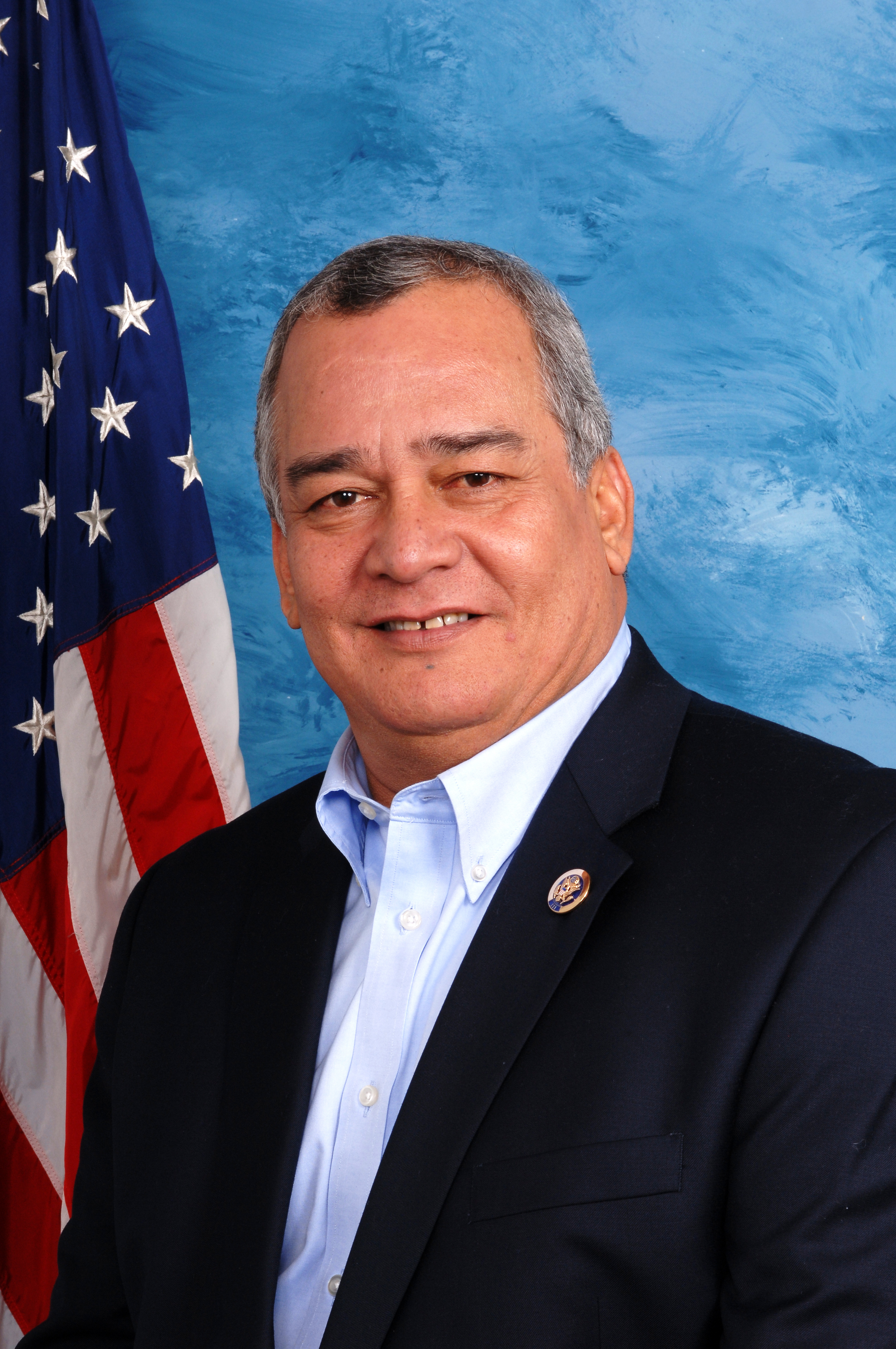

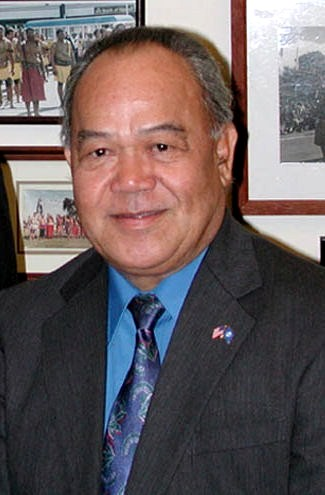

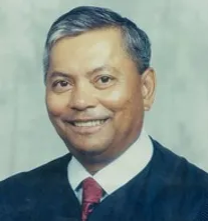

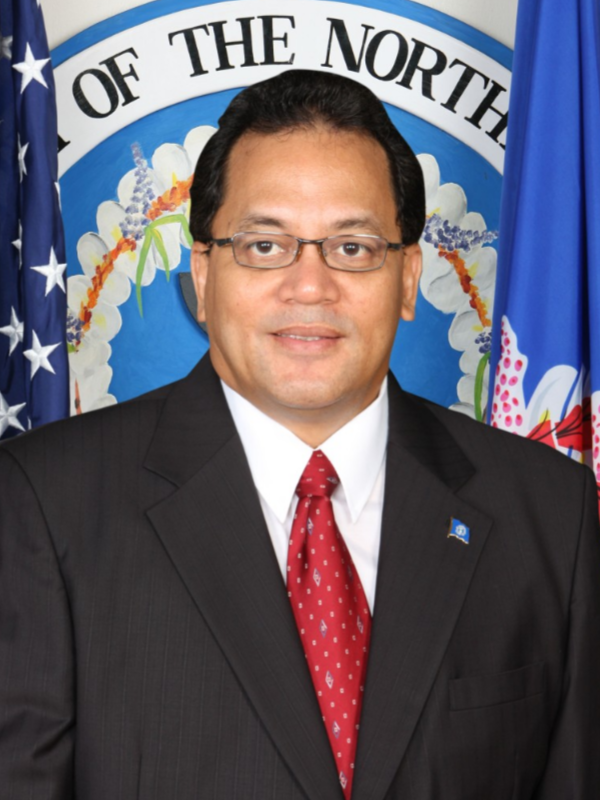

Nominee	Gregorio Sablan	Pedro Tenorio	John Gonzales
Party	Independent	Republican	Independent
Popular vote	2,474	2,117	1,855
Percentage	24.35%	20.83%	18.26%
Nominee	Juan Lizama	Luis Crisostimo	David Mendiola Cing
Party	Independent	Independent	Democratic
Popular vote	1,819	946	307
Percentage	17.90%	9.31%	3.02%
- Results by voting district: Gregorio Sablan: 20–25% 25–30% 30–35% Pedro Tenorio: 20–25% 25–30% John Gonzales: 20–25% 35–40% David Cing: 25–30% 35–40%
Delegate before election
New position
Elected Delegate
Gregorio Sablan
Independent

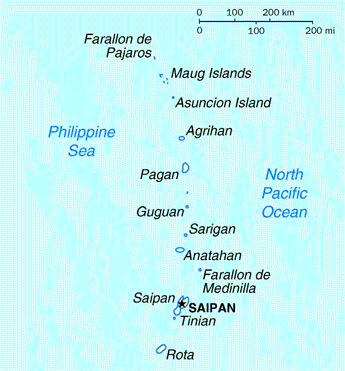
The new Delegate represented the entire Commonwealth in a newly created at-large congressional district.

The Northern Mariana Islands' first election of a delegate to the United States House of Representatives took place on November 4, 2008. Since the CNMI traditionally had general elections in odd-numbered years, the November 2008 ballot contained only this office.

The Commonwealth of the Northern Mariana Islands was the most recent United States jurisdiction to receive congressional representation in the United States House of Representatives (in the form of a non-voting delegate).

Gregorio Sablan, who ran as an independent, won the election and became the first Northern Mariana Islands Delegate in Congressional history. He assumed office in January 2009.

== Election background ==
The Consolidated Natural Resources Act of 2008 allowed the Northern Mariana Islands to elect its first Delegate in history to the United States House of Representatives and created a new Northern Mariana Islands' At-large congressional district.

Under the 2008 law, the new CNMI delegate was allowed to serve in United States Congressional committees within the House of Representatives and vote on proposed legislation on the committee level. However, as with the delegates from other U.S. territories, the CNMI delegate received limited powers, not being permitted to vote on full legislation on the United States House floor. The new delegate received all of the same allowances, benefits and compensation, including an approximately $170,000 a year salary, as a full member of the House of Representatives.

The new legislation also federalized the islands' immigration and labor controls and policies. The new provisions for United States government control over CNMI immigration policy were opposed by Governor Benigno Fitial, who filed a lawsuit in September 2008 in the U.S. District Court for the District of Columbia to halt the takeover. Fitial's suit contended that the immigration takeover by U.S. federal authorities, scheduled for mid-2009, would harm the economy of the Northern Mariana Islands by limiting the number of foreign aliens allowed to work in the territory. The leadership of the Northern Mariana Islands Senate opposed Fitial's lawsuit against the United States government and voted to deny a requested $400,000 in funding for the legal action.

Though legal action was still pending at the time of the election, Governor Benigno Fitial encouraged all registered CNMI voters to cast their ballots for the new delegate on election day.

The deadline for prospective candidates to file to run in the election was August 6, 2008.

The historic first federal election did not attract much attention, in terms of overall voter registration. Less than 13,000 people registered to vote in the lone Congressional election. These voters represented 1/4 of the total CNMI population. This represented a 15 percent drop in the number of registered voters from the 2007 midterm legislative elections.

== Candidates ==
- Listed alphabetically by political party

To be eligible to run in the 2008 Congressional election, each candidate was required to be a United States citizen, at least 25 years of age, and must have resided in the Northern Mariana Islands for at least seven years before the election. Candidates were also required to be registered CNMI voters on the day of the election (November 4, 2008) and could not seek any other elected office simultaneously.

The field of nine candidates for the Congressional election consisted of one Republican, one Democrat and seven independents. The nine candidates represented a very diverse mix of professional backgrounds.

=== Democratic Party (endorsed candidate) ===
- David Mendiola Cing, former member of the Northern Mariana Islands Senate

=== Independent candidates ===
- Felipe Quitugua Atalig, Saipan and Northern Islands Municipal Council member, a Republican, but running as an independent
- Luis Palacios Crisostomo Jr., incumbent member of the Northern Mariana Islands Senate. A Democrat, Crisostomo ran as an independent.
- John Henry Davies Jr., high school teacher and Vietnam War veteran
- John Gonzales, local television talk show host
- Juan Tudela Lizama, retired judge, a Republican, but running as an independent
- Gregorio C. Sablan, former Election Commission executive director, a Democrat, but running as an independent
- Chong Won, businessman originally from South Korea, first time political candidate

=== Republican Party (endorsed candidate) ===
- Pete Tenorio, current elected resident representative in Washington D.C. since 2002.

== Results ==
Northern Mariana Islands's at-large congressional district
Party	Candidate	Votes	%
Independent	Gregorio Kilili Camacho Sablan	2,474	24.35%
Republican	Pedro Agulto Tenorio	2,117	20.83%
Independent	John Oliver Delos Santos Gonzales	1,855	18.26%
Independent	Juan Tudela Lizama	1,819	17.90%
Independent	Luis Palacios Crisostimo	946	9.31%
Democratic	David Mendiola Cing	307	3.02%
Independent	Felipe Quitugua Atalig	249	2.45%
Independent	Chong Man Won	230	2.26%
Independent	John Henry Jr. Davis	164	1.61%
Invalid or blank votes			
Total votes		10,161	100.00%
Independent win (new seat)			
