= 2010 United States House of Representatives election in Northern Mariana Islands =

2010 United States House of Representatives election in the Northern Mariana Islands
- November 2, 2010
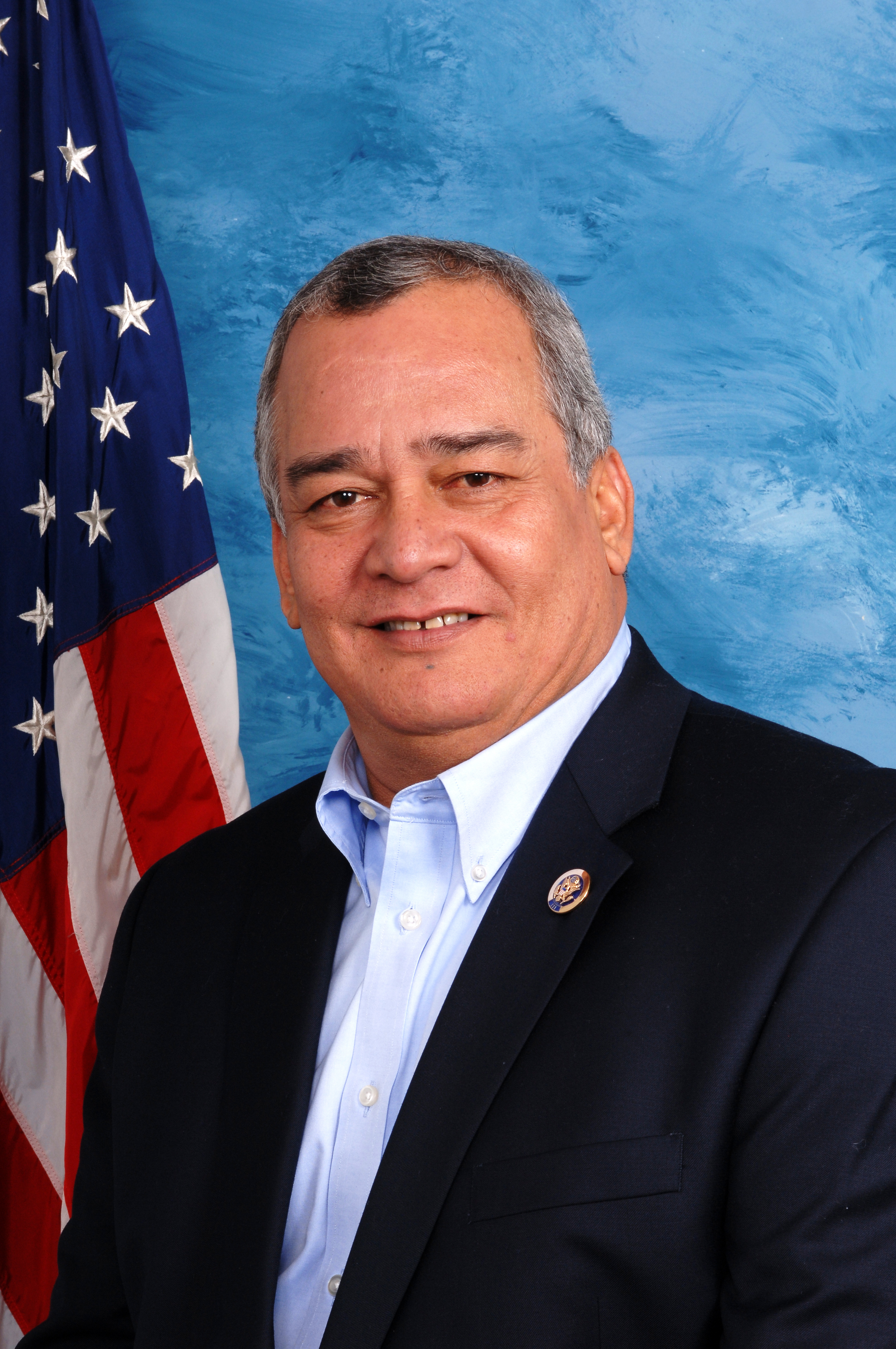

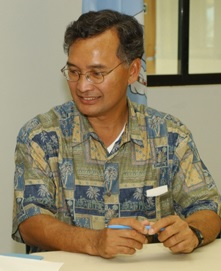

Nominee	Gregorio Sablan	Joe Camacho
Party	Independent	Covenant
Popular vote	4,896	2,744
Percentage	43.2%	24.2%
Nominee	Juan Babauta	Jesus Borja
Party	Republican	Democratic
Popular vote	1,978	1,707
Percentage	17.5%	15.0%
- Results by voting district: Gregorio Sablan: 30–35% 35–40% 45–50% 55–60% Joe Camacho: 40–45%
Delegate before election
Gregorio Sablan
Independent
Elected Delegate
Gregorio Sablan
Independent

The 2010 Congressional election in the Northern Mariana Islands occurred on November 2, 2010 and elected the territory's Delegate to the United States House of Representatives. Representatives and non-voting Delegates are elected for two-year terms; the elected will serve in the 112th Congress from January 3, 2011 until January 3, 2013.

These elections were held concurrently with the United States Senate elections of 2010, the United States House elections in other states and territories, and various territorial and local elections.

== Background ==
Gregorio Sablan, the first delegate from the Northern Mariana Islands to the House of Representatives, ran for re-election. Sablan was challenged by Covenant Party candidate Joe Camacho, an attorney and former Floor Leader in the Northern Mariana Islands House of Representatives. The local Republican Party candidate was Juan N. Babauta, the former Governor of the Northern Mariana Islands. There was also one Democratic (CNMI) challenger, Jesus Borja, a former lieutenant governor.

The race was considered to be highly competitive given Sablan's vulnerability, having been elected by less than a quarter of the vote in 2008, the strong Republican political environment, and the number of strong challengers.

== Candidates ==
- Gregorio Sablan (I), incumbent Delegate
- Joe Camacho (Cov), former Covenant Floor Leader in the Northern Mariana Islands House of Representatives
- Jesus Borja (D), former Lieutenant Governor of the Northern Mariana Islands
- Juan Babauta (R), former Resident Representative and former Governor of the Northern Mariana Islands

=== Results ===
Northern Mariana Islands' at-large district
Party	Candidate	Votes	%	±%
Independent	Gregorio Kilili Camacho Sablan (incumbent)	4,896	43.23%	+18.88%
Covenant	Joseph James Norita Camacho	2,744	24.23%	N/A
Republican	Juan Nekai Babauta	1,978	17.47%	−3.36%
Democratic	Jesus "Jesse" Camacho Borja	1,707	15.07%	+12.05%
Total votes		11,325	100.00	
Independent hold				
