= Kimberlyn King-Hinds =

American politician (born 1975)

Kim King-Hinds
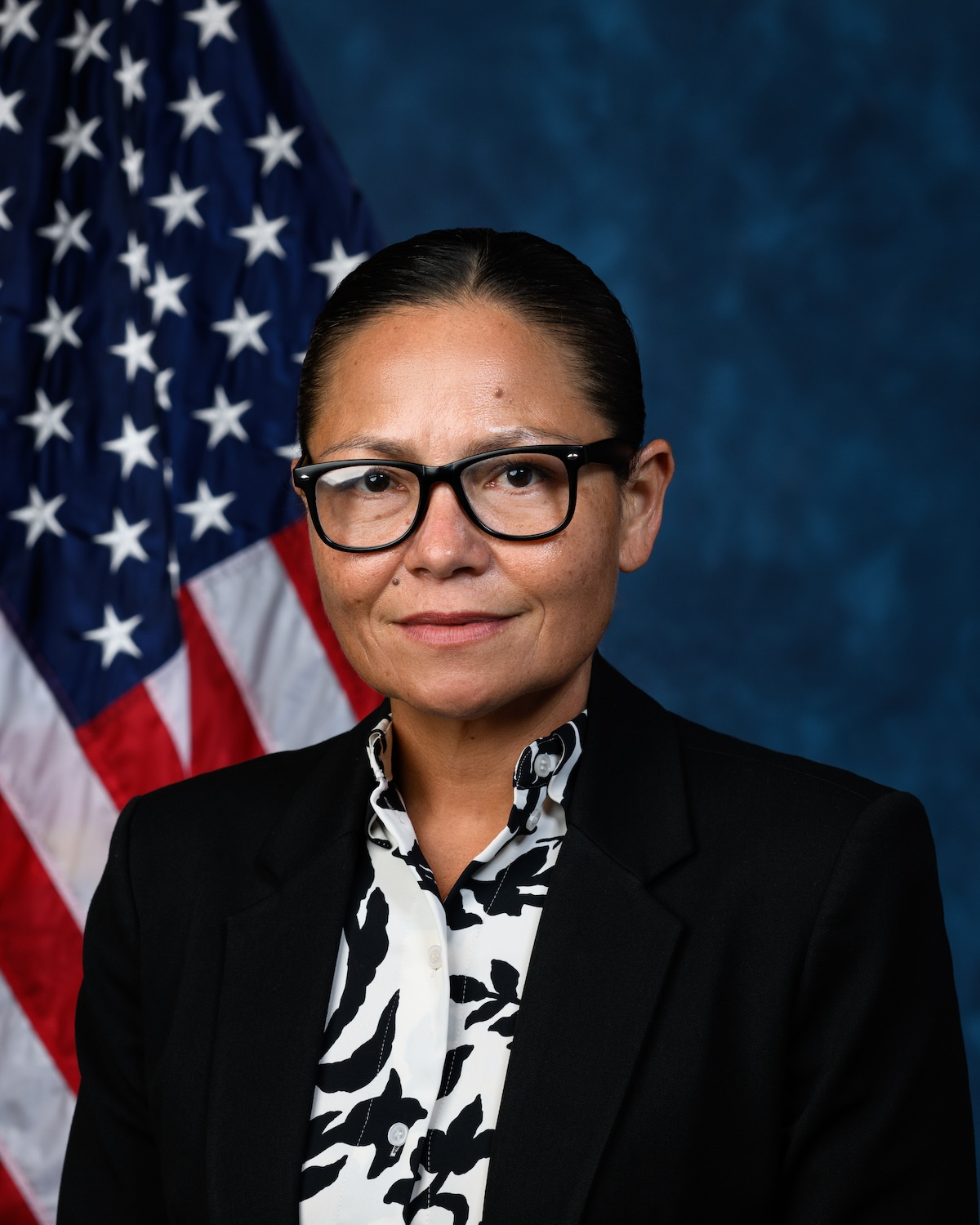
- Official portrait, 2025

Delegate to the U.S. House of Representatives from the Northern Mariana Islands' at-large district
- Incumbent
- Assumed office January 3, 2025
- Preceded by: Gregorio Sablan

Personal details
- Born: Kimberlyn Kay King; April 10, 1975 (age 51) Tinian, Northern Mariana Islands, U.S.
- Party: Republican
- Spouse: Chester Hinds
- Children: 1
- Relatives: Karl King-Nabors (brother)
- Education: Loyola Marymount University (BA); University of Hawaii, Manoa (MA, JD)
- Website: House website Campaign website
- King-Hinds's voice King-Hinds honoring the Association of Pacific Ports; Recorded July 23, 2026

Kimberlyn Kay King-Hinds (née King; born April 10, 1975) is an American attorney and politician serving as the delegate to the United States House of Representatives from the Northern Mariana Islands's at-large congressional district since 2025. A member of the Republican Party, she previously served as chair of the Commonwealth Ports Authority and as a member of the Commonwealth Public Utilities Commission. King-Hinds is one of two Chamorro members of Congress, alongside James Moylan.

== Early life and education ==
King-Hinds was born on April 10, 1975, to Serafina King, who served for a time as a member of the Northern Mariana Islands House of Representatives. Her brother is Senator Karl King-Nabors. King-Hinds is from Tinian. She is married to Chester Hinds and has one child.

She earned a Bachelor of Arts in political science from Loyola Marymount University. She later attended the University of Hawaiʻi at Mānoa where she earned a master's degree in human resource management from the Shidler College of Business, and earned a juris doctor from the William S. Richardson School of Law.

== Legal career and public service ==
From 2000 to 2002, she was the special assistant for projects and community services for Lieutenant Governor Jesus Sablan. She has served as member of the Commonwealth Public Utilities Commission and as Commonwealth Ports Authority board chair. She has served as a former legal counsel of the NMI Settlement Fund. She also served as chair of the Northern Marianas College board of regents from 2002 to 2006. She also served as executive director of the Tinian Youth Center and chief of staff of the Tinian mayor's office.

== U.S. House of Representatives ==
=== 2024 election ===
On January 18, 2024, incumbent Delegate Gregorio Sablan announced that he would not seek re-election in 2024. King-Hinds defeated Democratic candidate Ed Propst and three independent candidates with a plurality of 40.3% of the vote.

=== Tenure ===
King-Hinds was sworn into office at the start of the 119th United States Congress on January 3, 2025.

=== Committee assignments ===
For the 119th Congress:

- Committee on Small Business
  - Subcommittee on Contracting and Infrastructure
  - Subcommittee on Economic Growth, Tax, and Capital Access
- Committee on Transportation and Infrastructure
  - Subcommittee on Aviation
  - Subcommittee on Economic Development, Public Buildings and Emergency Management
  - Subcommittee on Highways and Transit
- Committee on Veterans' Affairs
  - Subcommittee on Economic Opportunity
  - Subcommittee on Health

== Electoral history ==
2024 United States House of Representatives election in Northern Mariana Islands
| Party | Candidate | Votes | % |
|---|---|---|---|
| Republican | Kimberlyn King-Hinds | 4,931 | 40.34% |
| Democratic | Ed Propst | 4,067 | 33.27% |
| Independent | John Oliver Delos Reyes Gonzales | 2,282 | 18.67% |
| Independent | James Michael Rayphand | 665 | 5.44% |
| Independent | Liana Sablan Hofschneider | 280 | 2.29% |
| Total votes | | 12,225 | 100.00% |

U.S. House of Representatives
| Preceded by Gregorio Sablan | Delegate to the U.S. House of Representatives from the Northern Mariana Islands' at-large congressional district 2025–present | Incumbent |
U.S. order of precedence (ceremonial)
| Preceded by Pablo Hernández Rivera | United States delegates by seniority 6th | Last |
| Preceded by Pablo Hernández Rivera | United States Order of Precedence | Succeeded by Jenniffer González-Colón as Governor of Puerto Rico |
