= Gregorio Sablan =

Northern Mariana Islander politician (born 1955)

Kilili Sablan
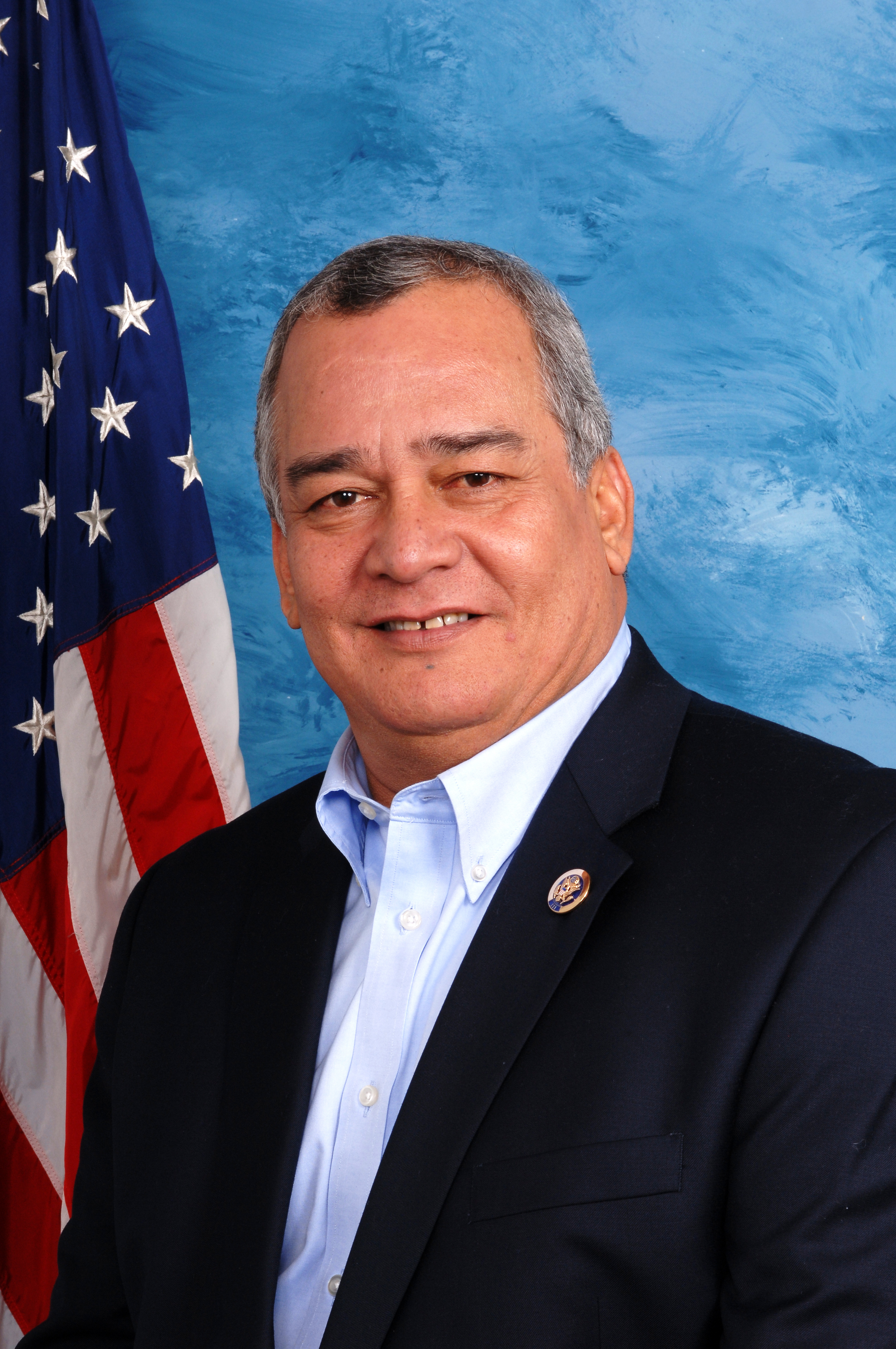
- Official portrait, 2009

Delegate to the U.S. House of Representatives from the Northern Mariana Islands's at-large district
- In office January 3, 2009 – January 3, 2025
- Preceded by: Pedro Tenorio (Resident Representative)
- Succeeded by: Kimberlyn King-Hinds

Personal details
- Born: Gregorio Kilili Camacho Sablan; January 19, 1955 (age 71) Saipan, Trust Territory of the Pacific Islands (now Northern Mariana Islands)
- Party: Democratic
- Spouse: Andrea Sablan
- Children: 6
- Education: University of Guam; Armstrong College; University of Hawaii, Manoa
- Sablan's voice Sablan on Medicaid the insular areas. Recorded June 21, 2019

Gregorio Kilili Camacho Sablan (/ɡrɪˈɡɔːrioʊ kɪˈliːli kəˈmɑːtʃoʊ səˈblɑːn/ grih-GOR-ee-oh kih-LEE-lee kə-MAH-choh sə-BLAHN; born January 19, 1955) is an American politician and former election commissioner. Elected in 2008, Sablan became the first delegate to the United States House of Representatives from the Commonwealth of the Northern Mariana Islands.

Sablan has been a member of the Democratic Party throughout his life, but ran as an independent for the delegate position, as the Democrats had nominated another candidate. He immediately changed his party affiliation in the House to Democratic in 2009, caucuses with Democrats and has remained an official party member during his tenure, but ran as an independent in all of his reelection campaigns between 2010 and 2020. He ran as a Democrat for the first time in 2022. On January 18, 2024, after serving 16 years as the CNMI's delegate to the United States House of Representatives, Sablan announced he would not seek re-election, going on to endorse the floor leader of the Northern Mariana Islands House of Representatives and fellow Democrat, Ed Propst for the 2024 election.

== Early life and education ==
Sablan was born on Saipan, capital of the CNMI, on January 19, 1955. He was the only son of seven children. He grew up in an extended family, spending much time with his grandparents. His father was an employee of Bank of America. His uncle was the mayor of Saipan.

At the age of eleven, Sablan began boarding at Xavier High School, Catholic school in Chuuk in the Federated States of Micronesia, then administered by the United States. He then returned to Saipan, where he graduated from Marianas High School. At the age of sixteen, Sablan began attending the University of Guam before transferring to the Armstrong University. However, he dropped out of college when his father lost his job. Upon returning to Saipan, Sablan married and had three children. He served in the United States Army Reserve from 1981 to 1986. He later attended the University of Hawaiʻi at Mānoa from 1989 until 1990, but did not graduate.

Sablan is married to Andrea, a Filipino American, and has six children, seven grandchildren and four great grandchildren.

== Early political career ==
Sablan was an assistant to Governor Carlos S. Camacho. In the 1981 general election, Sablan defeated Republican candidate Manuel D. Muna for the open seat in Precinct 2 in what was otherwise a strongly Republican election year. Sablan served two terms in the Northern Mariana Islands Commonwealth Legislature from 1982 until 1986 as a Democrat. During his second term, he was the chairman of the Committee on Federal Programs and of the Committee on War Claims and Federal Land Taking. During this time, he was selected as a special representative to hold talks with the United States Assistant Secretary of the Interior to negotiate federal assistance for the CNMI.

Sablan did not run for reelection in 1985. Governor Pedro P. Tenorio nominated Sablan to a CNMI-specific position with Senator Daniel Inouye of Hawaii. He returned to the Marianas after his time with Inoyue. After this, he briefly returned to college before returning to the CNMI to serve as Special Assistant for Management and Budget in the administration of Froilan Tenorio (1994–98). He later served as a Special Assistant in the administration of Pedro P. Tenorio (1998–2002) before being appointed Executive Director of the Commonwealth Election Commission, a position in which he served until he filed to run for delegate.

== Delegate to the U.S. House of Representatives ==
=== Background ===
For 30 years, beginning in 1978, citizens of the CNMI elected a Resident Representative, commonly known as Washington representative, an office established by Article V of the Constitution of the Northern Mariana Islands for the purpose of representing the CNMI in the United States capital and performing related official duties established by CNMI law.

In 2008, the Consolidated Natural Resources Act of 2008, signed into law by President George W. Bush, replaced the position of resident representative with a nonvoting delegate to the House of Representatives. The other United States insular areas, Guam, American Samoa, the United States Virgin Islands, and Puerto Rico, as well as the District of Columbia, already had nonvoting delegates to Congress. The new position received the power to serve in congressional committees, to introduce bills, and to vote on proposed legislation in committee, but still had limited powers on the House floor, lacking the right to vote on legislation on the House floor.

The election of the first delegate was set for November 4, 2008. It was the only contest on the ballot, as local elections in the CNMI occurred in odd-numbered years through 2009 and residents of the CNMI do not have the right to vote in United States presidential elections.

=== Elections ===
==== 2008 ====
Sitting Resident Representative Pedro A. Tenorio, a Republican, announced his candidacy for the new office. David Cing, a former member of the Northern Mariana Islands Senate, received the nomination of the Democratic Party of the Northern Mariana Islands, which was not officially affiliated with the national Democratic Party. Seven independents also ran for the office, including Sablan. Although Sablan was traditionally affiliated with the Democratic Party, he chose to run as an independent.

In the CNMI's first federal election, fewer than 13,000 people registered to vote in the election, and 79 percent of those who registered voted in the election.

During the campaign, Sablan stated that as delegate, he would seek to bring more federal funding for education, more federal funding for health care, and federal funding for a more productive search for effective alternative energy sources to the CNMI. He also said that as delegate he will introduce and pursue passage of submerged lands legislation that would give the CNMI economic rights and regulation for submerged lands and waters out 200 miles from the islands. He also supports federal funding for a United States Coast Guard station in the CNMI, although one already exists in neighboring Guam.

Sablan was elected the CNMI's first delegate to the House of Representatives on November 4, 2008, receiving 2,474 votes, or 23% of the vote. He defeated Tenorio, who received 20%, by only 357 votes. Other close competitors included fellow independents John Gonzales, who received 18.73% of the vote, and Juan Lizama, who received 17.34%.

==== 2010 ====
In a four-way race, Sablan received 4,896 votes (43%) defeating the Covenant Party's Joe Camacho (2,744), the Republican Party's former Governor Juan Babauta (1,978) and Democratic Party's former Lieutenant Governor Jesus Borja (1,707) in the 2010 general election.

==== 2012 ====
Sablan received 9,829 votes (80%) of the votes to Republican Ignacia T. Demapan's 2,503 votes in the November 2012 general election. Sablan is the first political candidate to record such a high winning total over an opponent.

==== 2014 ====
Sablan won the November 2014 election with 65.3% of the vote, defeating Democratic candidate Andrew Sablan Salas.

==== 2016 ====
Sablan successfully ran unopposed in the November 2016 election.

==== 2018 ====
Sablan won the November 2018 election, which was delayed for a week due to the impact of Typhoon Yutu, with 64.6% of the vote, defeating Republican candidate Angel Demapan.

==== 2020 ====
Sablan successfully ran unopposed in the November 2020 election. He received 11,449 votes, the CNMI's highest vote ever received by a candidate for an elected office.

==== 2022 ====
Sablan successfully ran unopposed in the November 2022 election. Previously an independent who caucused with the Democratic Party, he ran for re-election as the Democratic nominee for the first time in his career. He declined to run again in 2024.

=== Tenure ===
Sablan assumed office on January 3, 2009, and was sworn in on January 6. Sablan decided to caucus with the Democratic Party. Several dignitaries from the Northern Mariana Islands attended Sablan's swearing-in-ceremony by House Speaker Nancy Pelosi, including Edward Pangelinan, the first CNMI Resident Representative in Washington, and the outgoing CNMI Resident Representative in Washington, Pete Tenorio, whom Sablan defeated in the 2008 election.

On February 10, 2009, Sablan introduced submerged lands legislation which would give the CNMI "the same benefits in its submerged lands as Guam, the Virgin Islands, and American Samoa have in their submerged lands." The bill passed the House of Representatives by a vote of 416–0 on July 15, 2009, but stalled in the Senate.

Sablan has also introduced a bill which would provide for the establishment of Job Corps centers in U.S. territories and a bill which would authorize college tuition grants of up to $15,000 per year to graduates of CNMI high schools. The latter bill would also allow CNMI students to pay "in-state tuition" at any public college or university in the United States. Both bills stalled in the House.

As of September 2018, Sablan had sponsored two bills and cosponsored 37 that ultimately became law.

As delegate, Sablan has sought and often secured earmarks, energy grants, and other federal funding for projects in the CNMI. Much of this funding came from the American Recovery and Reinvestment Act of 2009. The ARRA did not include the CNMI in a 13.86% across-the-board increase in food stamp benefits nationally, but Sablan successfully lobbied Secretary of Agriculture Tom Vilsack to reprogram $1.459 million to give the Northern Marianas the same 13.86% increase as the rest of the country.

According to a report released by AOL News in July 2010, by the end of June 2010 (nine months into the U.S. government's fiscal year), Sablan had spent more money from his Members Representational Allowances on food than any other congressman with $23,457. Sablan said that the amount was used to refund staffers for various travel costs.

=== Committee assignments ===
- Committee on Education and the Workforce
  - Subcommittee on Early Childhood, Elementary, and Secondary Education
  - Subcommittee on Higher Education and Workforce Development
- Committee on Natural Resources (Vice Chair for Full Committee Insular Affairs, 116th and 117th Congresses)
  - Subcommittee on National Parks, Forests and Public Lands

Past committee assignments

- Committee on Agriculture (117th Congress)
  - Subcommittee on Nutrition, Oversight and Department Operations
- Committee on Veterans' Affairs (115th–117th Congresses)
  - Subcommittee on Health
  - Subcommittee on Oversight and Investigations

=== Caucus memberships ===
- American Citizens Abroad Caucus
- Congressional Asian Pacific American Caucus
- Congressional Hispanic Caucus
- Congressional Victim's Rights Caucus
- Congressional Caucus for the Equal Rights Amendment
- United States Congressional International Conservation Caucus
- National Marine Sanctuary Caucus
- Congressional Arts Caucus
- Congressional Wildlife Refuge Caucus
- U.S.-Japan Caucus
- United States–China Working Group
- Congressional Caucus on Turkey and Turkish Americans

== See also ==
- List of Asian Americans and Pacific Islands Americans in the United States Congress

U.S. House of Representatives
Preceded by Pedro Tenorio as Resident Representative of the Northern Mariana Islands	Delegate to the U.S. House of Representatives from the Northern Mariana Islands's at-large congressional district 2009–2025	Succeeded by Kimberlyn King-Hinds
