= Non-voting members of the United States House of Representatives =

Non-voting members of the United States House of Representatives (called either delegates or resident commissioner, in the case of Puerto Rico) are representatives of their territory in the House of Representatives, who do not have a right to vote on legislation in the full House but nevertheless have floor privileges and are able to participate in certain other House functions. Non-voting members may introduce legislation and may vote in a House committee of which they are a member.

There are six non-voting members: a delegate representing the District of Columbia, a resident commissioner representing Puerto Rico, and one delegate for each of the other four permanently inhabited U.S. territories: American Samoa, Guam, the Northern Mariana Islands and the U.S. Virgin Islands. A seventh delegate, representing the Cherokee Nation, has been formally proposed, while an eighth, representing the Choctaw Nation, which is named in the Treaty of Dancing Rabbit Creek has neither been proposed nor seated. As with voting members, delegates are elected every two years, except the resident commissioner of Puerto Rico, who is elected every four years.

== Privileges of delegates ==
Non-voting members serve exclusively in the House of Representatives; the Senate has no non-voting members (with the exception of the vice president of the United States, who may vote but only to break ties) and no members representing the territories or the District of Columbia. All delegates serve a term of two years, while resident commissioners serve a term of four years. They receive compensation, benefits, and franking privileges (the ability to send outgoing U.S. mail without a stamp) similar to full House members. The rules governing the rights of a non-voting member are set forth in the House Rules adopted in each congress (i.e., every two years). Since 1993, they have changed three times, giving delegates, along with the resident commissioner, privileges that they did not have previously.

== Early history ==
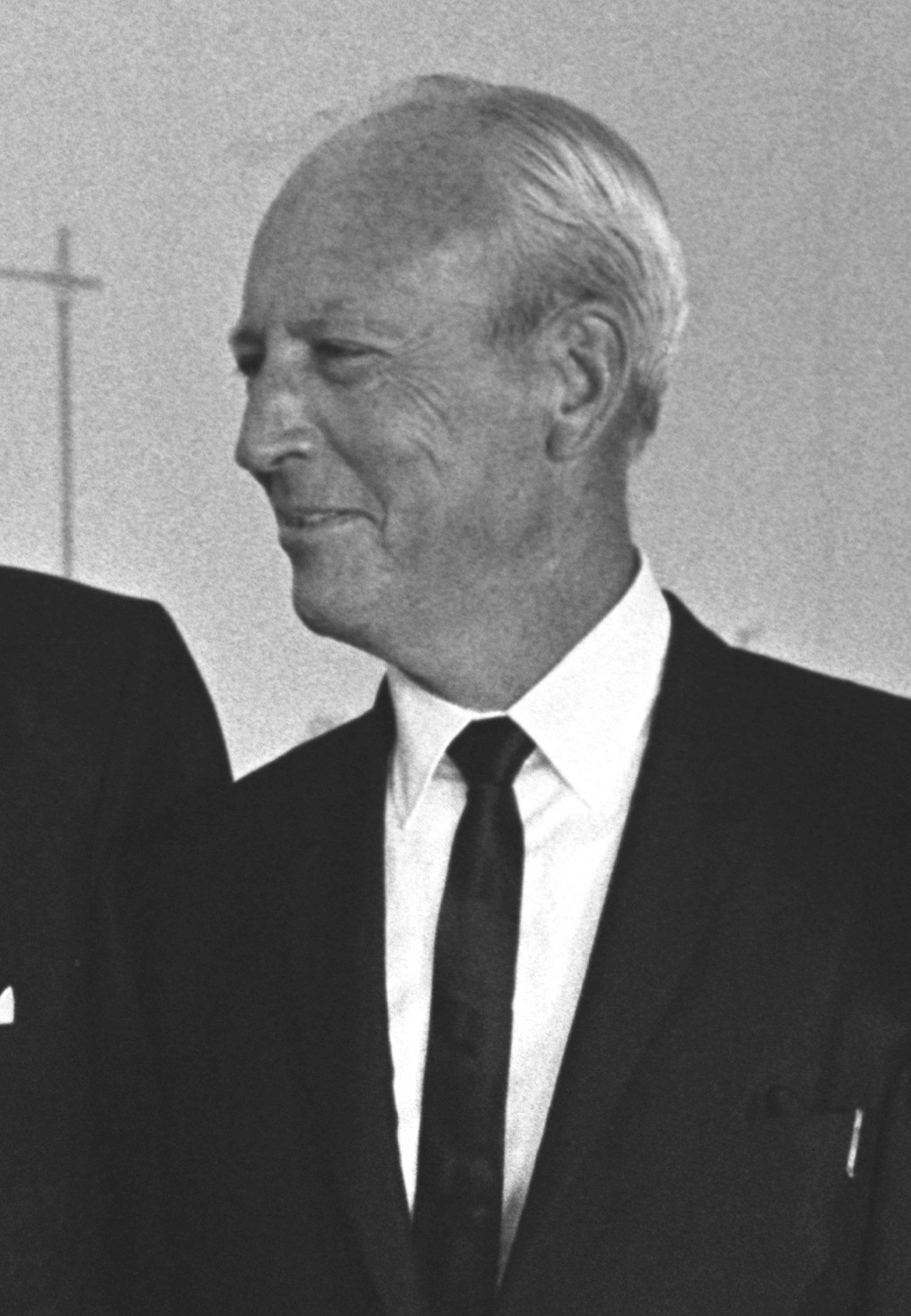
John A. Burns, the last delegate from Hawaii

Territorial delegates existed before the ratification of the United States Constitution. The Northwest Ordinance of 1787 allowed for territory with "five thousand free male inhabitants of full age" to elect a non-voting delegate to the Continental Congress. After the ratification of the Constitution, the first United States Congress reenacted the Ordinance and extended it to include the territories south of the Ohio River.

In 1790, the state of North Carolina—having recently ratified the constitution, becoming the 12th state—sent its congressional delegation to what was then the federal capital at New York City. Among them was former State of Franklin governor John Sevier, whose district (Washington District) comprised the "counties beyond the Alleghenies". He took office June 16, 1790, however, the government of North Carolina had ceded Washington District to the federal government on February 25, 1790, and it was organized as the Southwest Territory on August 7, 1790. He remained a member of the House until March 3, 1791, when he was appointed brigadier general of the militia.

On September 3, 1794, James White was elected by the Southwest Territory, which contained the former Washington District, to be their delegate to Congress. A resolution was put forth in the House to admit him to Congress, but as a delegate was not a position stated in the Constitution, the House debated what, if any, privileges White would have. As the Northwest Ordinance had only stated that a delegate is to sit "in Congress" the first debate was which chamber a delegate would sit in. Resolutions that he sit in both chambers and that his right to debate is limited to territorial matters were defeated. Ultimately, the House voted to allow him a non-voting seat in the House.

Following his placement, representatives debated whether he should take the oath. Representative James Madison stated "The proper definition of Mr. White is to be found in the Laws and Rules of the Constitution. He is not a member of Congress, therefore, and so cannot be directed to take an oath, unless he chooses to do it voluntarily." As he was not a member, he was not directed to take the oath, though every delegate after him has done so. He was also extended franking privileges, which allowed him to send official mail free of charge, and compensation at the same rate as members.

In 1802 Congress passed a law that specifically extended franking privileges and pay to delegates. An act passed in 1817 codified the term and privileges of delegates:

[I]n every territory of the United States in which a temporary government has been, or hereafter shall be established...shall have the right to send a delegate to Congress, such delegate shall be elected every second year, for the same term of two years for which members of the House of Representatives of the United States are elected; and in that house, each of the said delegates shall have a seat with a right of debating, but not of voting.

From that point on, until August 1959, there was not a single congress without delegates. During the period from 1870 to 1891, there were as many as ten serving at one time. With the admission of Hawaii, and with Puerto Rico sending a Resident Commissioner, the office temporarily went out of existence.

== Resident commissioner ==
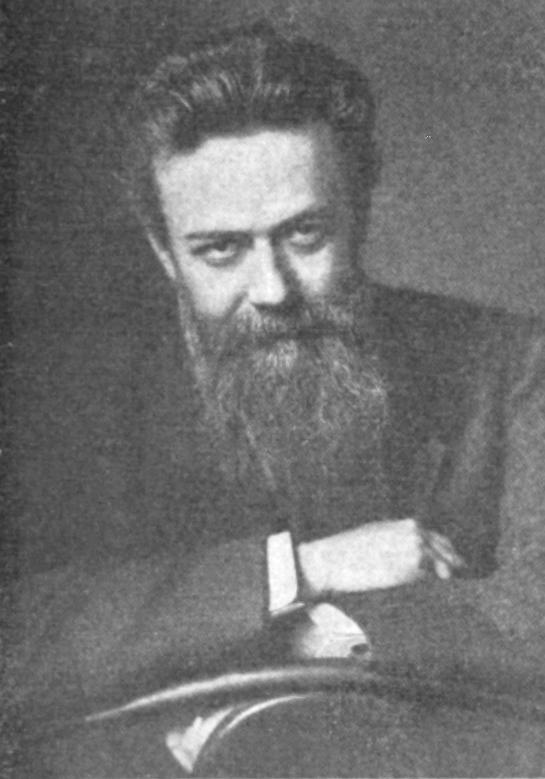
Federico Degetau y González of Puerto Rico, the first resident commissioner in the United States Congress

Similar to delegates are resident commissioners, who represented the large areas acquired during the Spanish–American War, and for much of the 20th century were considered colonies, not territories and unlike the previously acquired areas which would become the contiguous U.S. or Alaska and Hawaii, did not initially have residents with the rights of or to U.S. citizenship. Territories can gain independence from the United States with the consent of Congress, and in the case of the Philippines, they have.

=== Puerto Rico ===
Puerto Rico, a U.S. commonwealth, has been represented by a non-voting resident commissioner since 1901. The resident commissioner holds a status similar to that of a delegate within the House, but, since 1921, serves a four-year term. The resident commissioner is the only individual elected to the House who serves for this duration.

=== The Philippines ===
From 1907 until 1937, while it was a U.S. territory, the Philippines elected two non-voting resident commissioners to serve in the U.S. House of Representatives. From 1937 until 1946, while it was a U.S. commonwealth, the Philippines sent one non-voting resident commissioner to the House. Upon independence in 1946, the Philippines ceased to be represented in Congress but was instead represented by an Ambassador to the United States.

== List of past delegates ==
Listed here by their congressional districts.

Overview of delegates
District	Start	End	Duration (years)
Alabama Territory	1818	1819	1
Alaska Territory	1906	1959	53
Arizona Territory	1864	1912	48
Arkansas Territory	1819	1836	17
Colorado Territory	1861	1876	15
Dakota Territory	1861	1889	28
Florida Territory	1822	1845	23
Hawaii Territory	1900	1959	59
Idaho Territory	1864	1890	26
Illinois Territory	1812	1818	6
Indiana Territory	1805	1816	11
Iowa Territory	1838	1846	8
Kansas Territory	1854	1861	7
Michigan Territory	1819	1836	17
Minnesota Territory	1849	1858	9
Mississippi Territory	1801	1817	16
Missouri Territory	1812	1821	9
Montana Territory	1865	1889	24
Nebraska Territory	1855	1867	12
Nevada Territory	1861	1864	3
New Mexico Territory	1851	1912	61
Northwest Territory	1799	1802	3
Oklahoma Territory	1890	1907	17
Oregon Territory	1849	1859	10
Orleans Territory	1806	1812	6
Philippines	1907	1946	39
Southwest Territory	1794	1796	2
Utah Territory	1851	1897	46
Washington Territory	1854	1889	35
Wisconsin Territory	1836	1848	12
Wyoming Territory	1869	1890	21

== Current delegates ==
In the mid-1960s, a number of small territories that had no prospects of becoming states began to petition for representation in Congress. Starting in 1970, the House of Representatives started to grant representation to these territories, but with limited voting rights.

=== American Samoa ===
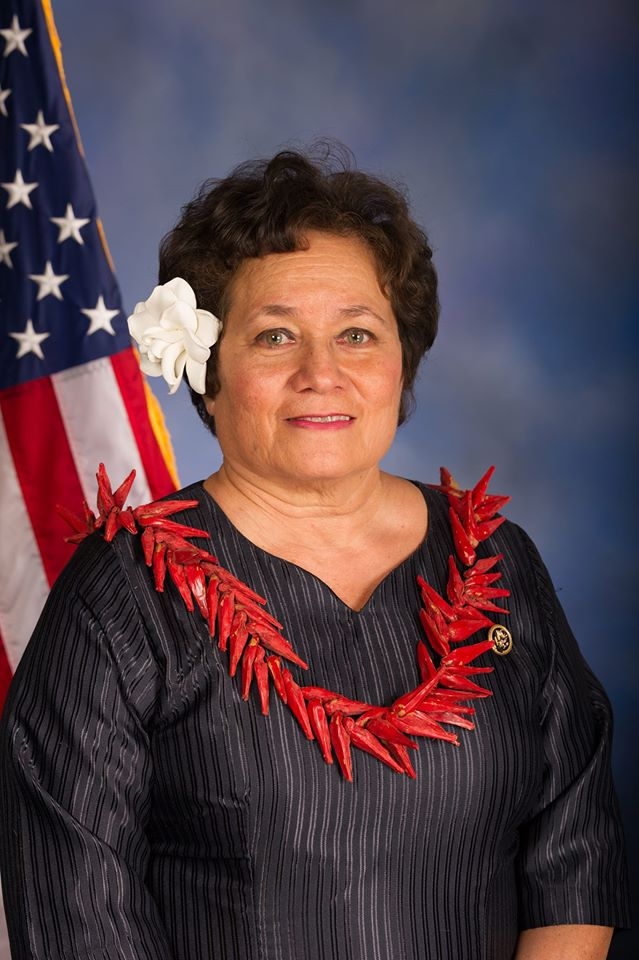
Amata C. Radewagen is American Samoa's first female delegate

As the U.S. Virgin Islands and Guam had delegates in Washington, D.C., the American Samoa-based Political Status Study Commission had meetings with the delegates from these two territories. They came home to Pago Pago convinced of the importance of having this representation in the nation's capital. Members of the American Samoa Fono had already been attending budget hearings in Washington for over a decade by 1970. During a special session held in July 1969, Salanoa Aumoeualogo, the President of the American Samoa Senate, introduced Senate Bill 54 to create a delegate at-large to Washington with four-year terms (without congressional rights), which was approved by Governor Owen Aspinall on August 8, 1969. A. U. Fuimaono was elected as the first delegate at-large in 1970 before ending his term to run unsuccessfully for Governor of American Samoa. A. P. Lutali became the territory's second delegate to Washington in 1975. Fofō Sunia was elected in 1978 after Lutali declined to run for reelection. He went to Washington knowing his term would be limited to two years, since a law had passed establishing an official non-voting delegate seat for American Samoa. Sunia was elected as American Samoa's first congressional delegate in 1981.

=== District of Columbia ===
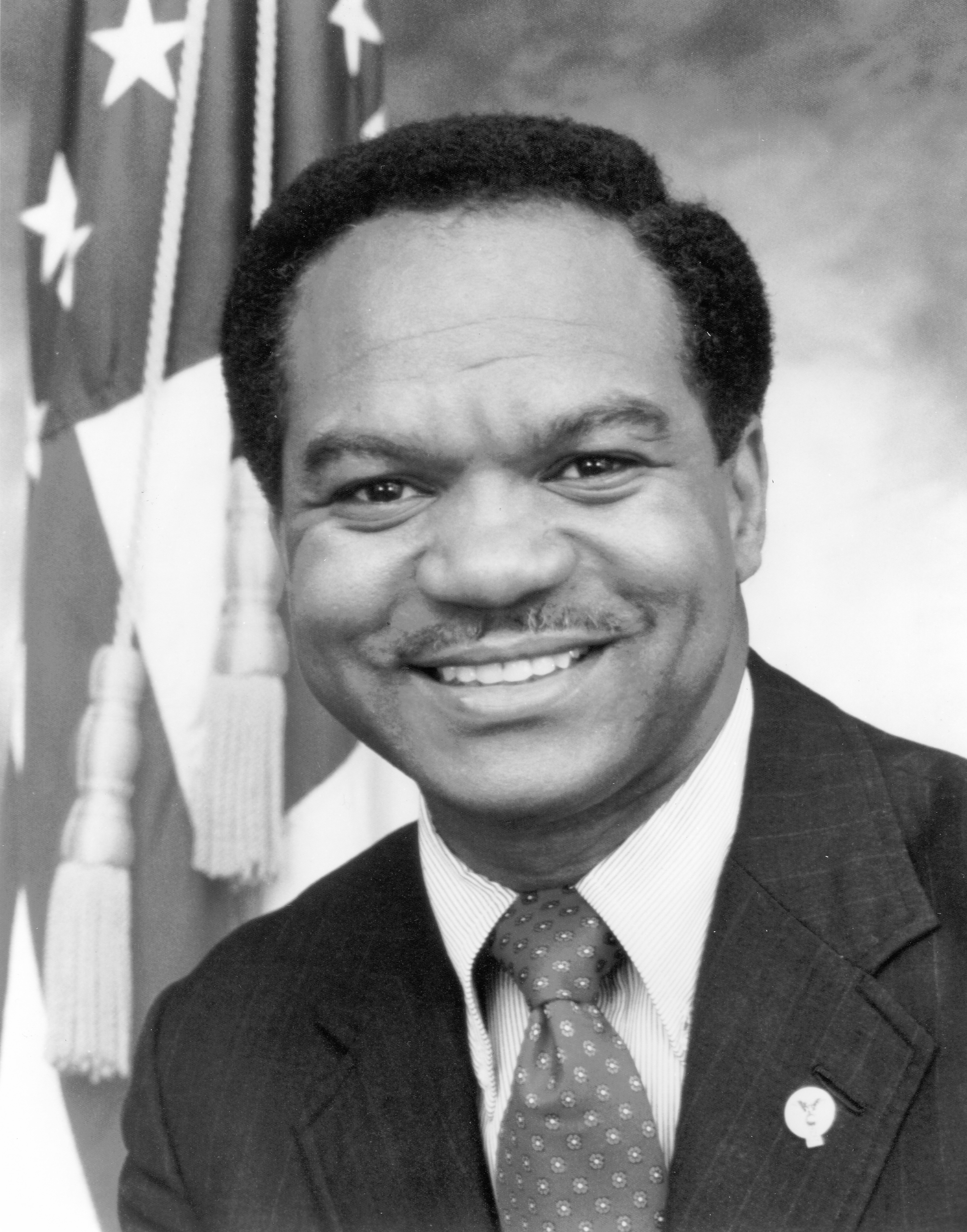
Walter E. Fauntroy, delegate from the District of Columbia from 1971 to 1991

The District of Columbia is a federal district, not a territory, commonwealth or insular area. From 1871 to 1875, it briefly had a delegate to Congress. This situation did not last long and congressional representation was terminated. The district had no other delegates until 1971, when the House of Representatives agreed to seat Walter E. Fauntroy. He served in that position between March 23, 1971 and January 3, 1991, when Eleanor Holmes Norton was elected. Norton will continue in this position until January 3rd, 2027, when she will be succeeded by Robert White Jr.

=== U.S. Virgin Islands ===
In 1972, the House agreed to admit Ron de Lugo as a delegate from the United States Virgin Islands, which had been a U.S. territory since 1917 after they were purchased from Denmark under the 1916 Treaty of the Danish West Indies. The current delegate, Democrat Stacey Plaskett, became the first nonvoting delegate to serve as an impeachment manager in the second impeachment trial of Donald Trump.

=== Guam ===
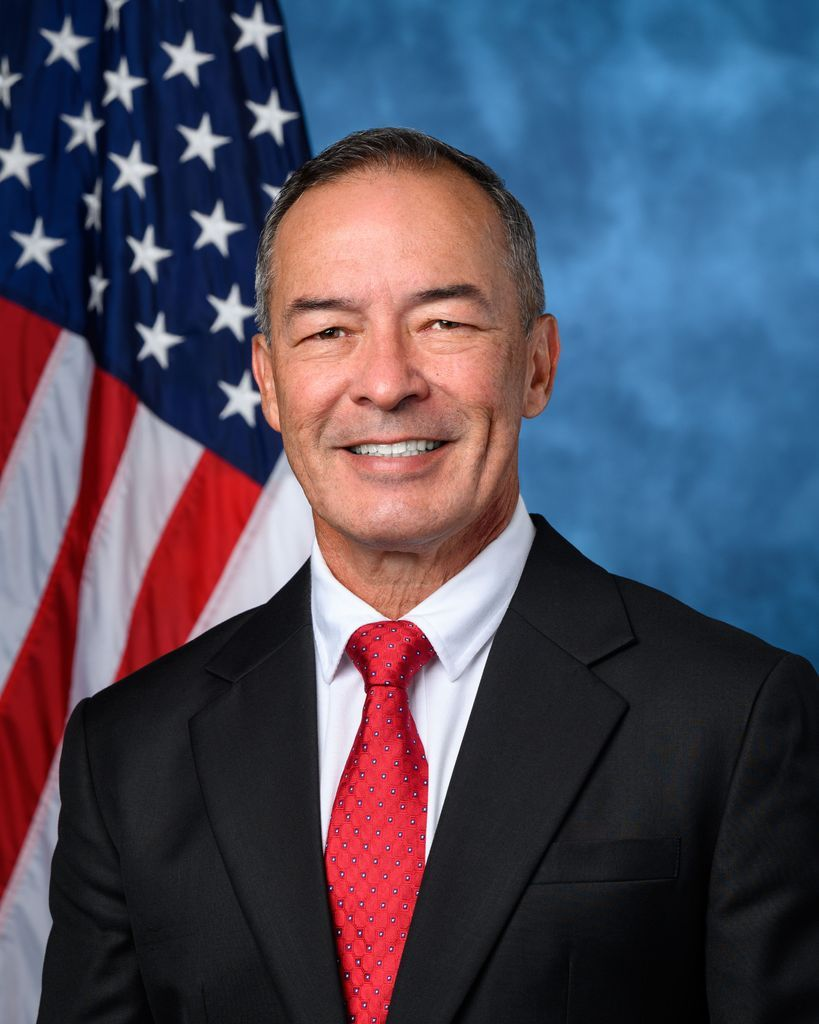
James Moylan, delegate from Guam since 2023

In 1972, the House also agreed to admit Antonio Borja Won Pat as a delegate from Guam, which had been a U.S. territory since 1899 when it was ceded to the United States by Spain under the Treaty of Paris. Won Pat had been serving as the Washington Representative since 1965, an office without congressional rights that lobbied for a place in the House. Since 2023, this seat has been represented by Republican James Moylan.

=== Northern Mariana Islands ===
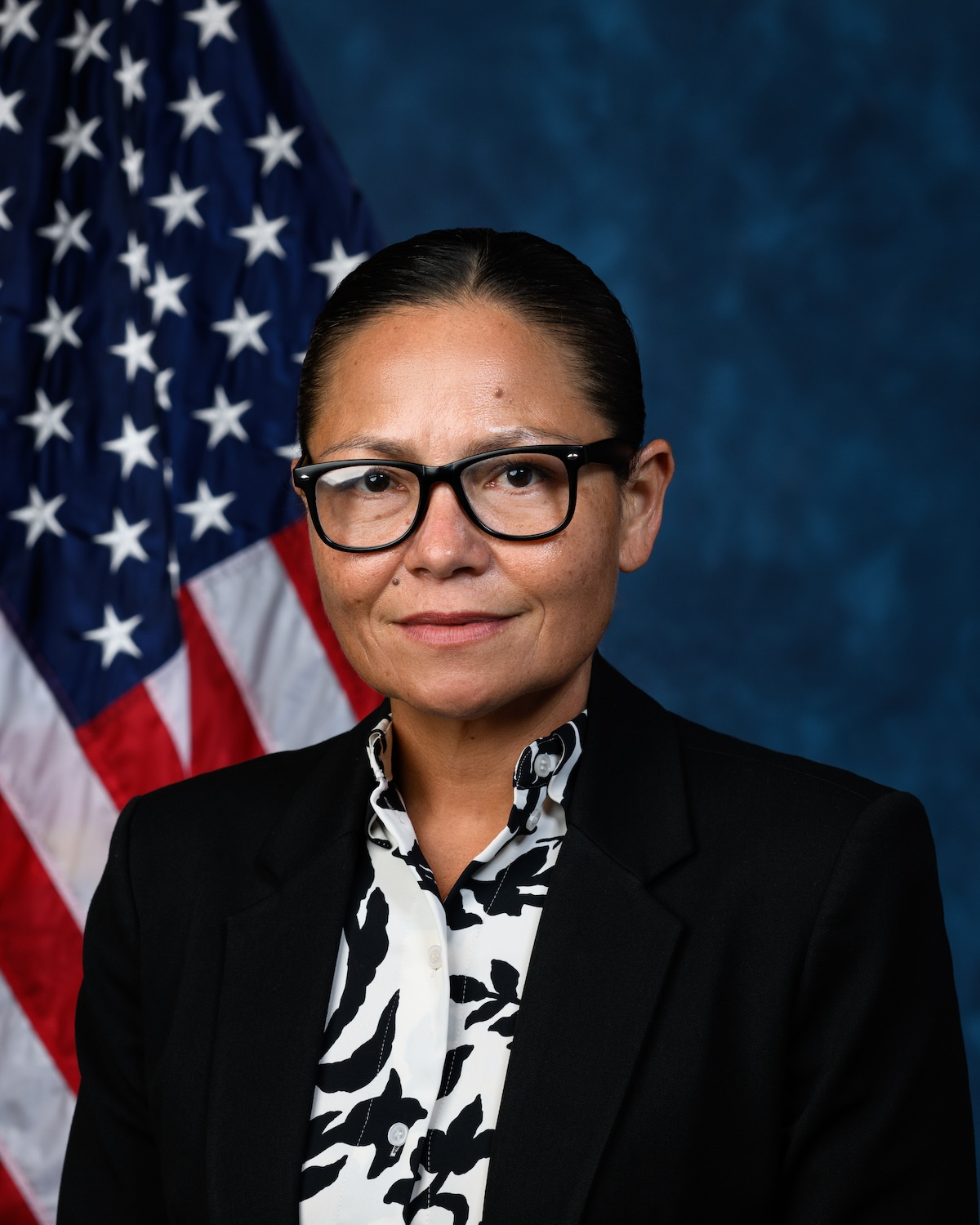
Kimberlyn King-Hinds, delegate from the Northern Mariana Islands since 2025

For thirty years, since 1978, citizens of the Commonwealth of the Northern Mariana Islands (CNMI) elected a resident representative, commonly known as Washington representative, an office without congressional rights that was established to represent the CNMI in Washington and performing related official duties established by CNMI law.

In 2008, the Consolidated Natural Resources Act of 2008, signed into law by President George W. Bush, replaced the position of Resident Representative with a non-voting delegate to the House of Representatives. The election of the first delegate took place in November 2008. It was the only contest on the ballot because CNMI elections traditionally occurred in odd-numbered years. Democrat Gregorio Sablan won the election and took office in January 2009. Sablan retired in 2024 and was succeeded by Republican Kimberlyn King-Hinds.

== Proposed representation ==
=== Native American treaty-right delegates ===
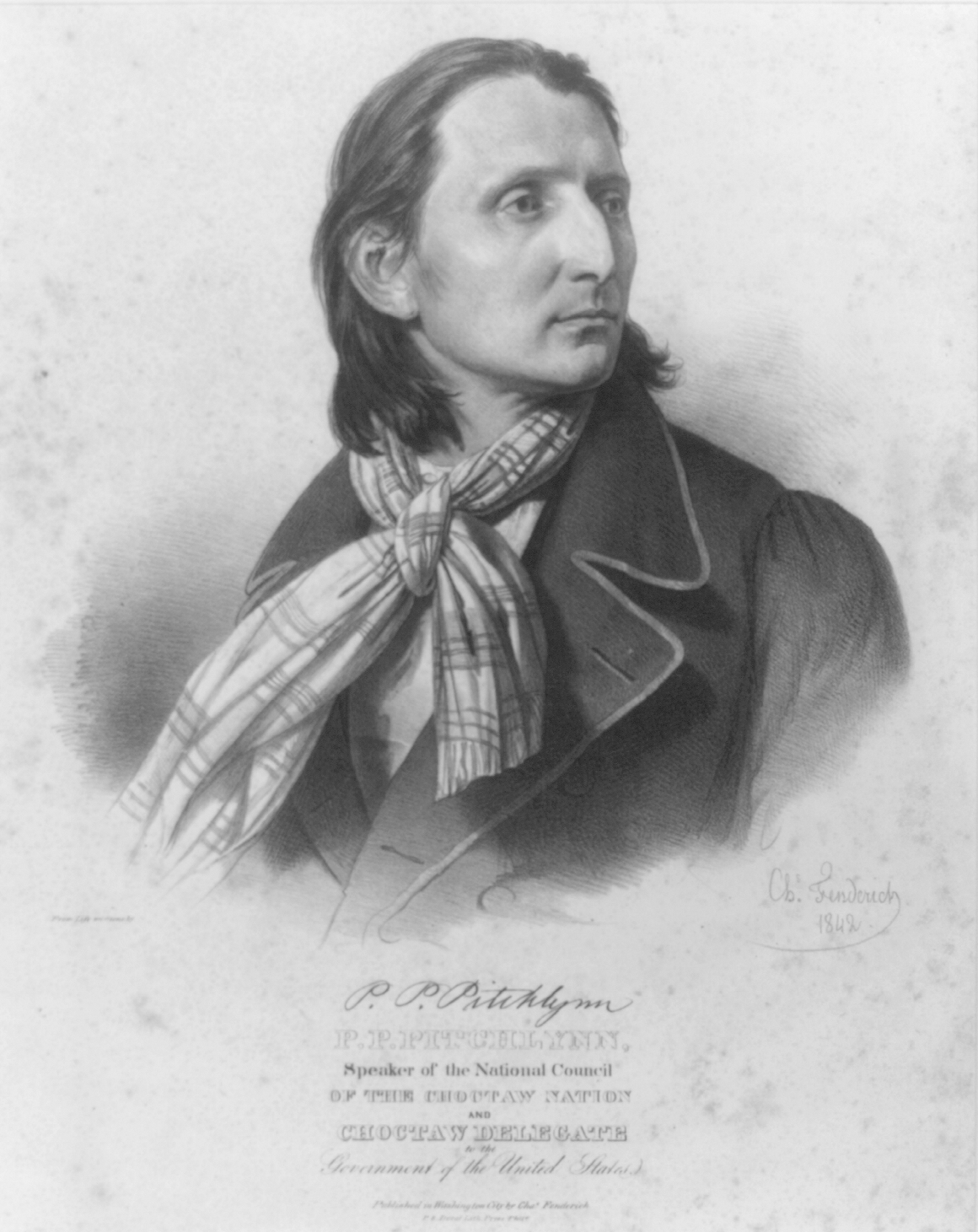
Choctaw Nation Delegate Peter Pitchlynn, who served as ambassador from 1845 to 1861 and again from 1866 to 1881

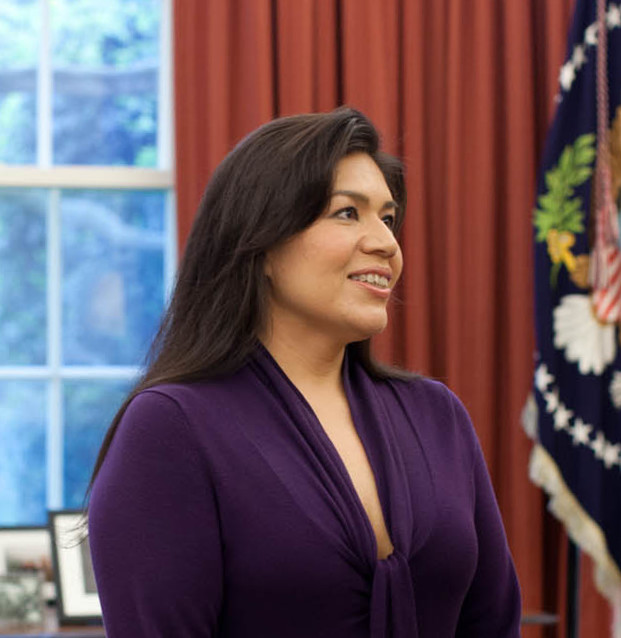
Cherokee Nation Delegate to Congress Kimberly Teehee

The Cherokee and Choctaw Native American tribes have treaty rights to send delegates to Congress. The right to a non-voting delegate to Congress was promised to the Cherokee by the Treaty of Hopewell in 1785 (affirmed in 1835's Treaty of New Echota) and to the Choctaw under the Treaty of Dancing Rabbit Creek in 1830, "whenever Congress shall make provision for [a delegate]". Congress has never provided for the appointment of delegates from Indian tribes. The Choctaw tribe has never appointed a delegate to Congress and the Cherokee had not until 2019. However, the Choctaw did send a non-congressional delegate to Washington for most of the 19th century as an ambassador to represent them before the U.S. government, the most noteworthy being Peter Pitchlynn.

In addition, the first treaty signed between the United States and a Native American nation, the Treaty of Fort Pitt (1778) with the Lenape ("Delaware Nation"), encouraged them to form a state that would have representation in Congress; however, it is unclear if the treaty would allow a delegate without the formation of a U.S. state. In 2022, Deborah Dotson, president of Delaware Nation, expressed an opinion that their treaty right was "stronger" than the Cherokees' and voiced frustration about their treaty promises being ignored.

A similar situation actively exists at the state legislature level with the Maine House of Representatives maintaining seats for three non-voting delegates representing the Penobscot (since 1823), the Passamaquoddy (since 1842), and the Maliseet (since 2012). The rights of the tribal delegates has fluctuated over time but appears to have been born from a practice in Massachusetts General Court (Maine was a part of Massachusetts until 1820). Unlike the situation at the federal level, Maine's state-level tribal delegates are established by state law rather than treaties. As of 2018, only the Passamaquoddy seat was filled; the other two Nations had chosen to not fill their seats in protest over issues of tribal sovereignty and rights; the Maliseet returned and filled their seat again in 2025, leaving only the Penobscot vacant. The Wisconsin Legislature, the Legislative Assembly of New Brunswick in Canada, and the New Zealand Parliament were allegedly reviewing Maine's indigenous delegate policy for their own adoption (though New Zealand had already established Māori electorates since 1867).

A 2022 Congressional Research Service report on Native representation in Congress

There remain, however, untested questions about the validity of such delegates. If tribal citizens are represented in the House by both a voting member and a non-voting delegate, that might be seen as contrary to the principle of "one person, one vote". Disagreement on which federally recognized tribes would appoint the relevant delegate could also occur (e.g. the Choctaw delegate might represent only the Choctaw Nation of Oklahoma, say, or also the Mississippi Band of Choctaw Indians; similarly with the Cherokee Nation and the United Keetoowah Band of Cherokee Indians). In 2022, the Congressional Research Service published "Legal and Procedural Issues Related to Seating a Cherokee Nation Delegate in the House of Representatives", addressing these concerns and logistical issues.

On August 25, 2019, the Cherokee Nation formally announced its intention to appoint a delegate, nominating Kimberly Teehee, the tribe's vice president of government relations, as its first delegate. According to the process used for other non-voting delegates, the House of Representatives must vote to formally admit Teehee. Some congressional leaders have expressed concerns about Teehee being appointed by a tribal government rather than elected by tribal members; Teehee has contended that, since the Cherokee Nation is a sovereign nation, her appointment as a delegate should be viewed analogous to an ambassadorship. An ambassadorial view of Native delegates is consistent with prior history of Native envoys to Washington and Maine's state-level tribal delegates. Teehee's appointment to the House was not finalized in the 116th Congress and has been reported to have been delayed by the COVID-19 pandemic. Teehee remained unseated as of September 2022, when the Cherokee Nation government reiterated their insistence that Congress seat her.

=== Proposed representation in the Senate ===
Michael San Nicolas, who represented Guam in the House, filed bills proposing for the election of single, nonvoting delegates by Guam, American Samoa, the Northern Mariana Islands, Puerto Rico and U.S. Virgin Islands to the Senate, all for six-year terms. The 2022 version of the bill, H. R. 6941, received the endorsement of the Congressional Hispanic Caucus. San Nicolas also cosponsored legislation in favor of statehood for the District of Columbia and Puerto Rico.

== Expanding (and contracting) voting rights ==
The positions of non-voting delegates are now a more or less permanent fixture of the House of Representatives, having been supported by legislation. However, this legislation stipulates that "...the right to vote in the committee shall be provided by the Rules of the House." Under Article I, Section 5 of the U.S. Constitution, the House establishes its rules, which allows a majority of the House to change the powers of delegates. Since the 1970s, delegates have served on Congressional committees with the same powers and privileges as members of Congress, including the right to cast votes, but since 1993 their ability to vote on the floor of the House has changed several times.

In 1993, the 103rd Congress approved a rule change that allowed the four delegates and the resident commissioner to vote on the floor of the House, but only in the Committee of the Whole. However, if any measure passed or failed in the Committee of the Whole because of a delegate's vote, a second vote—excluding the delegates—would be taken. In other words, delegates were permitted to vote only if their votes had no effect on a measure's ultimate outcome. This change was denounced by Republicans as a case of partisanship, as all five of the delegates either were Democrats or were allied with the Democrats at the time. The Democrats had lost a dozen House seats in the 1992 elections, and Republicans charged that allowing delegates to vote would inflate Democratic vote totals.

In 1995, this rule was reversed by the newly seated Republican majority in the 104th Congress, stripping the delegates, all of whom caucused with the Democrats, of even non-decisive voting privileges. Upon re-gaining control of the House in January 2007, Democrats revived the 1993–1995 status for delegates during both the 110th and 111th Congresses. After taking back control of the House in 2011, Republicans again revoked the right of delegates to vote in the Committee of the Whole during the term of the 112th Congress. In 2019, Democrats regained control of the House and again restored voting rights for delegates; they retained the right to vote in the Committee of the Whole since the 116th United States Congress. In a contrast from previous GOP majorities, delegate voting in the Committee of the Whole remained in place for the 118th Congress.

== Current non-voting members of the U.S. House of Representatives ==
As of the 119th United States Congress, the six non-voting delegates consist of three Democrats and three Republicans. Pablo Hernández Rivera, of Puerto Rico, a member of the Popular Democratic Party, affiliates nationally to the Democratic Party.

Overview of current non-voting members of the House
District	Title	Incumbent	Party	House Caucus Affiliation	First elected	Constituency map
American Samoa at-large	Delegate	Amata Coleman Radewagen	Republican	Republican	2014	
District of Columbia at-large	Delegate	Eleanor Holmes Norton	Democratic	Democratic	1990	
Guam at-large	Delegate	James Moylan	Republican	Republican	2022	
Northern Mariana Islands at-large	Delegate	Kimberly King-Hinds	Republican	Republican	2024	
Puerto Rico at-large	Resident commissioner	Pablo Hernández Rivera	Popular Democratic	Democratic	2024	
U.S. Virgin Islands at-large	Delegate	Stacey Plaskett	Democratic	Democratic	2014	

== See also ==
- Member of Congress
- Shadow congressperson
- Maine Legislature: Maine House of Representatives (Non-voting tribal delegates)
- American Samoa Fono: American Samoa House of Representatives (Swains Island)
