= 2020 Northern Mariana Islands general election =

- 3 November 2020
- Delegate election
- 3 November 2020
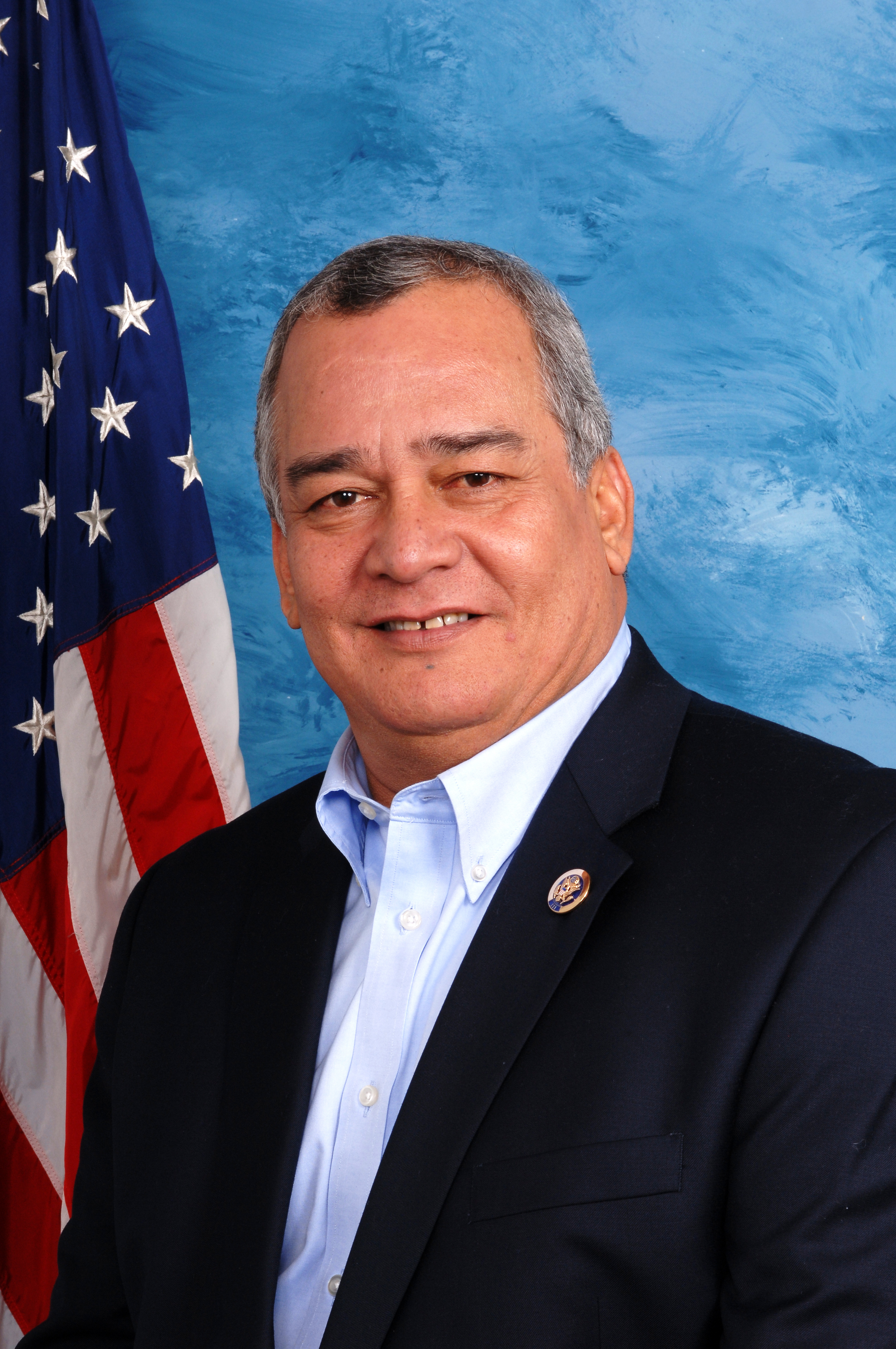

Nominee	Gregorio Sablan
Party	Independent
Popular vote	11,449
Percentage	100.00%
Delegate before election
Gregorio Sablan
Independent
Elected Delegate
Gregorio Sablan
Independent
- Senate election
- 3 of the 9 seats in the Senate; 5 seats needed for a majority
Party	Seats
Republican	5
Independents	3
Democratic	1
This lists parties that won seats. See the complete results below.
- House election
- All 20 seats in the House of Representatives; 11 seats needed for a majority
Party	Seats
Republican	9
Democratic	8
Independents	3
This lists parties that won seats. See the complete results below.

The 2020 Northern Mariana Islands general election were held on Tuesday, 3 November 2020, corresponding with the 2020 United States general elections. Voters in the Northern Mariana Islands voted for the non-voting delegate to the United States House of Representatives, 3 seats in the Northern Mariana Islands Senate, all twenty seats in the Northern Mariana Islands House of Representatives, seats for the municipal council, seats for the board of education, 1 justice, and 2 judges.

This election oversaw the return of the CNMI Democratic Party as a major force in CNMI politics for the first time in a decade. 2020 also saw the first time a party was able to challenge the CNMI Republican Party since the Covenant Party was dissolved in 2013. Four incumbent representatives that were elected as independents announced that they would run for re-election as Democrats while another independent aligns with the party. Prior to the 2020 election, the Democrats had not won a legislative seat since their last wins in the 2007 general elections. The result of the 2020 general election was that the CNMI had experienced a blue wave, with the Democrats controlling nearly half the house and adding a member to the senate. The Republicans lost the trifecta it held since the 2016 Northern Mariana Islands general election and the single-party system it held since 2013. Voter turnout was at 72.05%, lower than the previous general election years of 2018, which was 77.4%, and 2014, which was 76.7%.

== Delegate to the US House of Representatives ==
Incumbent Delegate Gregorio Sablan, an independent who caucuses with the Democratic Party, ran uncontested for re-election. Sablan, first elected in 2008, had held the seat since its creation in 2009. Delegate Gregorio Sablan was re-elected. The Northern Mariana Islands' non-voting delegate to the U.S. House of Representatives are elected for a two-year term.

Northern Mariana Islands's at-large congressional district
Party	Candidate	Votes	%	±%
Independent	Gregorio Kilili Camacho Sablan (incumbent)	11,449	100.00%	+36.23%
Total votes		11,449	100.00%	
Independent hold				

== Northern Mariana Islands Commonwealth Legislature ==
=== Results summary ===
Parties	House Election Results		Seat Change	Party strength
Parties	2018	2020	+/−	Party strength
Republican	13	9	4 ▼	45.00%
Democratic	0	8	8 ▲	40.00%
Independent	7	3	4 ▼	15.00%
Totals	20	20	Steady	100.00%

Parties	Senate Election Results		Seat Change	Party strength
Parties	2018	2020	+/−	Party strength
Republican	6	5	1 ▼	55.56%
Independent	3	3	Steady	33.33%
Democratic	0	1	1 ▲	11.11%
Totals	9	9	Steady	100.00%

=== Senate ===
The Northern Mariana Islands Senate is the upper house of the Northern Mariana Islands Commonwealth Legislature, consisting of nine senators representing three senatorial districts (Saipan & the Northern Islands, Tinian & Aguijan, and Rota), each a Multi-member district with three senators. Each district had one seat open for the 2020 elections.

Rota 1st Senatorial District (1 seat)
Party	Candidate	Votes	%
Independent	Paul Atalig Manglona (incumbent)	764	53.43%
Republican	Dennis James Camacho Mendiola	666	46.57%
Total votes		1,430	100.00%
Independent hold			

Tinian 2nd Senatorial District (1 seat)
Party	Candidate	Votes	%
Republican	Karl Rosario King-Nabors	738	58.52%
Democratic	Jose Pangelinan Cruz	523	41.48%
Total votes		1,261	100.00%
Republican hold			

Saipan 3rd Senatorial District (1 seat)
Party	Candidate	Votes	%
Democratic	Edith E. Deleon Guerrero	5,176	51.23%
Republican	Sixto Kaipat Igisomar (incumbent)	4,928	48.77%
Total votes		10,104	100.00%
Democratic gain from Republican			

=== House of Representatives ===
The Northern Mariana Islands House of Representatives is the lower house of the Northern Mariana Islands Commonwealth Legislature. The house has seven districts and five of the seven are Multi-member district. In 2019, a four-way race took place for a single seat in district 3 after its became vacant when Republican Rep. Francisco Dela Cruz died in January 2019. Republican Party candidate Marco Taisakan Peter was the victor. All twenty seats were up for the 2020 elections.

House of Representative - District 1: Saipan (6 seats)
Party	Candidate	Votes	%
Democratic	Edwin Kenneth Propst (incumbent)	1,891	10.26%
Democratic	Celina Roberto Babauta	1,743	9.46%
Independent	Joseph Arriola Flores (incumbent)	1,594	8.65%
Republican	Joseph Leepan Tenorio Guerrero (incumbent)	1,560	8.46%
Republican	Roy Christopher Aldan Ada	1,530	8.30%
Republican	Angel Aldan Demapan	1,455	7.89%
Republican	Roman Cepeda Benavente (incumbent)	1,298	7.04%
Independent	Vincent Raymond Seman Aldan	1,266	6.87%
Democratic	Peter Francis Reyes Muna	1,247	6.77%
Democratic	Antonio Blas Cabrera	1,180	6.40%
Independent	Luis John Deleon Guerrero Castro (incumbent)	1,120	6.08%
Democratic	Benusto Piteg	1,036	5.62%
Republican	Randall Dexter Masga Pangelinan	820	4.45%
Independent	Glenn Hocog Manglona	693	3.76%
Total votes		18,433	100.00%

House of Representative - District 2: Saipan (2 seats)
Party	Candidate	Votes	%
Democratic	Christina Marie Elise Sablan (incumbent)	587	29.93%
Republican	John Paul Palacios Sablan (incumbent)	534	27.23%
Republican	Daniel Iwashita Aquino Jr.	423	21.57%
Democratic	Luella Ichihara Marciano	417	21.26%
Total votes		1,961	100.00%

House of Representative - District 3: Saipan (6 seats)
Party	Candidate	Votes	%
Independent	Edmund Joseph Sablan Villagomez (incumbent)	1,622	12.76%
Republican	Blas Jonathan "BJ" Tenorio Attao (incumbent)	1,546	12.17%
Republican	Ivan Alafanson Blanco (incumbent)	1,457	11.47%
Democratic	Denita Kaipat Yangetmai	1,287	10.13%
Democratic	Vicente Castro Camacho	1,268	9.98%
Republican	Ralph Naraja Yumul (incumbent)	1,240	9.76%
Democratic	Corina Lorraine Magofna	1,199	9.44%
Republican	Marco Taisakan Peter (incumbent)	1,090	8.58%
Democratic	Alfredo Litulumar Saures	1,051	8.27%
Republican	Jose Ilo Itibus (incumbent)	947	7.45%
Total votes		12,707	100.00%

House of Representative - District 4: Saipan (2 seats)
Party	Candidate	Votes	%
Republican	Joel Castro Camacho (incumbent)	835	32.31%
Democratic	Sheila Therese Jack Babauta (incumbent)	731	28.29%
Republican	Cecilia Remedio Taitano	616	23.84%
Democratic	Jenita Babauta Castro	402	15.56%
Total votes		2,584	100.00%

House of Representative - District 5: Saipan (2 seats)
Party	Candidate	Votes	%
Democratic	Leila Haveia Fleming Clark Staffler	1,330	36.77%
Democratic	Richard Tudela Lizama	954	26.38%
Republican	Lorenzo Iglecias Deleon Guerrero (incumbent)	637	17.61%
Republican	Ramon Sablan Basa	485	13.41%
Independent	Joseph Muna Mendiola	211	5.83%
Total votes		3,617	

House of Representative - District 6: Tinian (1 seat)
Party	Candidate	Votes	%
Republican	Patrick Hofschneider San Nicolas	647	51.72%
Democratic	Frederick Arend Dela Cruz	604	48.28%
Total votes		1,251	100.00%
Republican hold			

House of Representative - District 7 Rota: (1 seat)
Party	Candidate	Votes	%
Independent	Donald Manalang Manglona (incumbent)	916	64.10%
Republican	Barry Cuthbert Toves	513	35.90%
Total votes		1,429	100.00%
Independent hold			

== Municipal Council ==
Municipal Council - Saipan & Northern Islands (non-partisan)
Party	Candidate	Votes	%
Nonpartisan	Antonia Manibusan Tudela	6,332	51.02%
Nonpartisan	Ana Demapan Castro (incumbent)	6,080	48.98%
Total votes		12,412	

Municipal Council - Tinian & Aguiguan (non-partisan)
Party	Candidate	Votes	%
Nonpartisan	Joseph Romaldo Evangelista Santos	856	24.78%
Nonpartisan	Michael Nap King Aldan	795	23.01%
Nonpartisan	Thomasa Rita Palacios Mendiola (incumbent)	658	19.04%
Nonpartisan	Juanita Masga Mendiola	575	16.64%
Nonpartisan	Joseph Manglona Manglona	571	16.53%
Total votes		3,455	

Municipal Council - Rota (non-partisan)
Party	Candidate	Votes	%
Nonpartisan	Willian Apatang Taitano	799	21.52%
Nonpartisan	Jonovan Hocog Lizama	765	20.60%
Nonpartisan	Jim Michael Atalig	647	17.43%
Nonpartisan	Michael Cain Sikebert	612	16.48%
Nonpartisan	Lorita Mesngon Mangolna	590	15.89%
Nonpartisan	Abraham Manglona Ogo	300	8.08%
Total votes		3,713	

== Board of education ==
Board of Education - Saipan & Northern Islands (non-partisan)
Party	Candidate	Votes	%
Nonpartisan	Maisie Bermudes Tenorio	7,248	48.50%
Nonpartisan	Gregory Pat Borja	4,860	32.52%
Nonpartisan	Stephen Carl Woodruff	2,837	18.98%
Total votes		14,945	

Board of Education - Rota (non-partisan)
Party	Candidate	Votes	%
Nonpartisan	Herman Manglona Atalig (incumbent)	985	100.00%
Total votes		985	

== Justices ==
Justice	For retention		Against retention		Total
Justice	Votes	%	Votes	%	Total
Robert Camacho Naraja	9,836	81.28%	2,266	18.72%	12,102

== Judges ==
Judge	For retention		Against retention		Total
Judge	Votes	%	Votes	%	Total
Robert Camacho Naraja	10,236	84.48%	1,881	15.52%	12,117
Kenneth Lewis Govendo	9,592	79.96%	2,404	20.04%	11,996
