= 2016 Northern Mariana Islands general election =

| 8 November 2016 |
- Delegate election
| ← 2014 | 8 November 2016 | 2018 → |
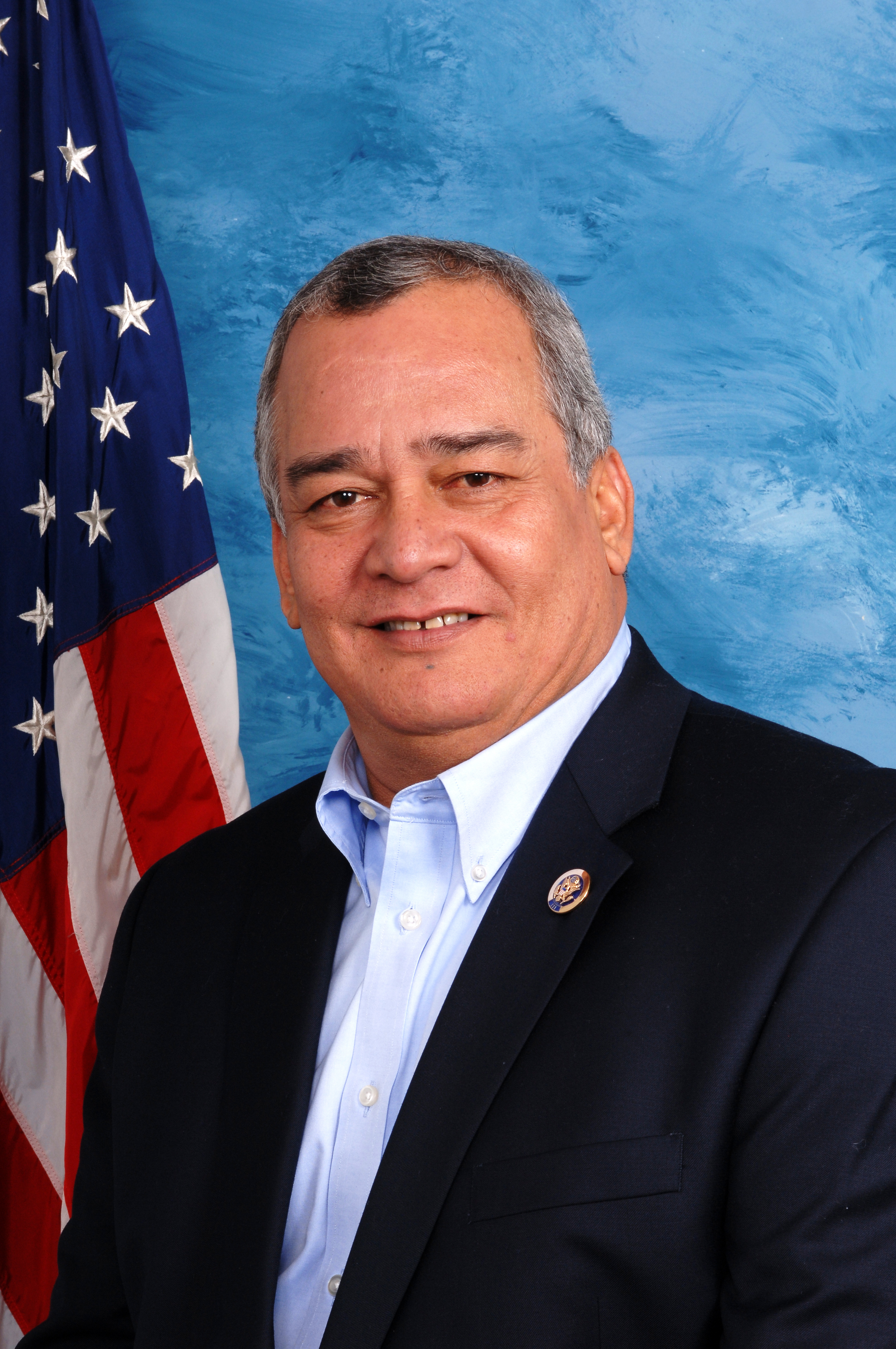

| Nominee | Gregorio Sablan |
| Party | Independent |
| Popular vote | 10,605 |
| Percentage | 100.00% |
Delegate before election
Gregorio Sablan
Independent
Elected Delegate
Gregorio Sablan
Independent
- Senate election
- 3 of the 9 seats in the Senate; 5 seats needed for a majority
| Party | Seats |
|---|---|
| Republican | 7 |
| Independents | 2 |
This lists parties that won seats. See the complete results below.
- House election
- All 20 seats in the House of Representatives; 11 seats needed for a majority
| Party | Seats |
|---|---|
| Republican | 14 |
| Independents | 6 |
This lists parties that won seats. See the complete results below.

The 2016 Northern Mariana Islands general election were held on Tuesday, 8 November, 2016. The election coincided with the 2016 United States general elections.

Voters in the Northern Mariana Islands voted for the non-voting delegate to the United States House of Representatives, 3 seats in the Northern Mariana Islands Senate, all twenty seats in the Northern Mariana Islands House of Representatives, seats for the municipal council, seats for the board of education, and 1 judge.

== Delegate to the US House of Representatives ==
Incumbent Delegate Gregorio Sablan, an independent who caucuses with the Democratic Party, ran unopposed for re-election. Sablan, first elected in 2008, had held the seat since its creation in 2009. Delegate Gregorio Sablan was re-elected. The Northern Mariana Islands' non-voting delegate to the U.S. House of Representatives was elected for a two-year term.

Northern Mariana Islands's at-large congressional district
| Party | Candidate | Votes | % | ±% |
|---|---|---|---|---|
| Independent | Gregorio Kilili Camacho Sablan (incumbent) | 10,605 | 100.00% | +34.70% |
| Total votes | | 10,605 | 100.00% | |
| Independent hold | | | | |

== Northern Mariana Islands Commonwealth Legislature ==
=== Results summary ===
| Parties | House Election Results | | Seat Change | Party Strength |
| Parties | 2014 | 2016 | +/− | Strength |
|---|---|---|---|---|
| Republican | 7 | 14 | 7 ▲ | 70.00% |
| Independent | 13 | 6 | 7 ▼ | 30.00% |
| Democratic | 0 | 0 | Steady | 0.00% |
| Totals | 20 | 20 | Steady | 100.00% |

| Parties | Senate Election Results | | Seat Change | Party Strength |
| Parties | 2014 | 2016 | +/− | Strength |
|---|---|---|---|---|
| Republican | 7 | 7 | Steady | 77.78% |
| Independent | 2 | 2 | Steady | 22.22% |
| Democratic | 0 | 0 | Steady | 0.00% |
| Totals | 9 | 9 | Steady | 100.00% |

=== Senate ===
The Northern Mariana Islands Senate is the upper house of the Northern Mariana Islands Commonwealth Legislature, consisting of nine senators representing three senatorial districts (Saipan & the Northern Islands, Tinian & Aguijan, and Rota), each a Multi-member district with three senators. Each district had one seat open for the 2016 elections.

Rota 1st Senatorial District (1 seat)
| Party | Candidate | Votes | % |
|---|---|---|---|
| Independent | Paul Atalig Manglona | 651 | 43.03% |
| Republican | George Ogo Hocogo | 478 | 31.59% |
| Democratic | Thomas Lee Atalig Manglona | 384 | 25.38% |
| Total votes | | 1,513 | 100.00% |

Tinian 2nd Senatorial District (1 seat)
| Party | Candidate | Votes | % |
|---|---|---|---|
| Republican | Francisco Manglona Borja (incumbent) | 713 | 55.19% |
| Independent | Henry Hofschneder San Nicolas | 579 | 44.81% |
| Total votes | | 1,292 | 100.00% |

Saipan 3rd Senatorial District (1 seat)
| Party | Candidate | Votes | % |
|---|---|---|---|
| Republican | Sixto Kaipat Igisomar (incumbent) | 5,825 | 63.69% |
| Independent | Ray Naraja Yumul | 3,321 | 36.31% |
| Total votes | | 9,146 | 100.00% |

=== House of Representatives ===
The Northern Mariana Islands House of Representatives is the lower house of the Northern Mariana Islands Commonwealth Legislature. The house has seven districts and five of the seven are Multi-member district.

House of Representative - District 1: Saipan (6 seats)
| Party | Candidate | Votes | % |
|---|---|---|---|
| Independent | Edwin Kenneth Propst (incumbent) | 2,024 | 12.68% |
| Republican | Angel Aldan Demapan (incumbent) | 1,975 | 12.37% |
| Republican | Joseph Leepan Tenorio Guerrero (incumbent) | 1,702 | 10.66% |
| Independent | Joseph Pinaula Deleon Guerrero (incumbent) | 1,591 | 9.97% |
| Republican | Janet Ullao Maratita | 1,580 | 9.90% |
| Republican | Gregorio Jr. Muna Sablan | 1,513 | 9.48% |
| Independent | Roman Cepeda Benavente (incumbent) | 1,438 | 9.01% |
| Republican | Antonio Pangelinan Sablan (incumbent) | 1,403 | 8.79% |
| Independent | Joseph Arriola Flores | 1,348 | 8.44% |
| Independent | Ana Sablan Teregeyo | 721 | 4.52% |
| Independent | Anthony Indalecio Duenas | 668 | 4.18% |
| Total votes | | 15,963 | 100.00% |

House of Representative - District 2: Saipan (2 seats)
| Party | Candidate | Votes | % |
|---|---|---|---|
| Republican | John Paul Palacios Sablan (incumbent) | 571 | 39.24% |
| Republican | Rafael Sablan Demapan (incumbent) | 512 | 35.19% |
| Independent | Vincente Aldan Ichihara | 372 | 25.57% |
| Total votes | | 1,455 | 100.00% |

House of Representative - District 3: Saipan (6 seats)
| Party | Candidate | Votes | % |
|---|---|---|---|
| Republican | Ivan Alafanso Blanco | 1,267 | 10.94% |
| Independent | Blas Jonathan "BJ" Tenorio Attao (incumbent) | 1,259 | 10.87% |
| Independent | Edmund Joseph Sablan Villagomez (incumbent) | 1,157 | 9.99% |
| Republican | Donald Cabrera Barcinas | 1,126 | 9.72% |
| Republican | Francisco Santos Dela Cruz | 1,010 | 8.72% |
| Republican | Jose Ilo Itibus | 997 | 8.61% |
| Independent | Ralph Naraja Yumul (incumbent) | 958 | 8.27% |
| Independent | Heiz Sablan Hofschneider | 905 | 7.82% |
| Independent | Anthony Tenorio Benavente (incumbent) | 842 | 7.27% |
| Independent | Ramon Angailen Tebuteb (incumbent) | 831 | 7.18% |
| Independent | Stanley Estanislao Tudela McGinnis Torres | 628 | 5.42% |
| Independent | Vicente Castro Camacho | 600 | 5.18% |
| Total votes | | 11,580 | 100.00% |

House of Representative - District 4: Saipan (2 seats)
| Party | Candidate | Votes | % |
|---|---|---|---|
| Independent | Vinson Edward Flores Sablan (incumbent) | 753 | 34.40% |
| Republican | Alice Santos Igitol | 610 | 27.87% |
| Republican | George Norita Camacho (incumbent) | 529 | 24.17% |
| Independent | Joseph Kani Ruak | 222 | 10.14% |
| Democratic | Aaron Jay Murdock | 75 | 3.43% |
| Total votes | | 2,189 | 100.00% |

House of Representative - District 5: Saipan (2 seats)
| Party | Candidate | Votes | % |
|---|---|---|---|
| Independent | Lorenzo Iglecuas Deleion Guerrero (incumbent) | 843 | 27.58% |
| Republican | Francisco Concepcion Aguon | 827 | 27.05% |
| Republican | Antonio Reyes Agulto | 528 | 17.27% |
| Independent | James Anthony Duenas Cabrera | 522 | 17.08% |
| Independent | Antonio Muna Camacho | 337 | 11.02% |
| Total votes | | 3,057 | 100.00% |

House of Representative - District 6: Tinian (1 seat)
| Party | Candidate | Votes | % |
|---|---|---|---|
| Republican | Edwin Palacios Aldan (incumbent) | 685 | 53.02% |
| Independent | Diana Hocog Borja | 607 | 46.98% |
| Total votes | | 1,292 | 100.00% |

House of Representative - District 7: Rota (1 seat)
| Party | Candidate | Votes | % |
|---|---|---|---|
| Republican | Glenn Lizama Maratita (incumbent) | 804 | 53.96% |
| Democratic | Tricia Marie Atalig Manglona | 686 | 46.04% |
| Total votes | | 1,490 | 100.00% |

== Municipal Council ==
Municipal Council - Saipan & Northern Islands (non-partisan)
| Party | Candidate | Votes | % |
|---|---|---|---|
| Nonpartisan | Luis John Deleon Guerrero Castro | 6,107 | 54.72% |
| Nonpartisan | Diego Litulumar | 5,053 | 45.28% |
| Total votes | | 11,160 | 100.00% |

Municipal Council - Tinian & Aguiguan (non-partisan)
| Party | Candidate | Votes | % |
|---|---|---|---|
| Nonpartisan | Phillip Thomas Menfiola-Long | 731 | 19.17% |
| Nonpartisan | Antonio San Nicolas Borja | 664 | 17.41% |
| Nonpartisan | Edwin Manglona Hofschneider (incumbent) | 658 | 17.26% |
| Nonpartisan | Raynaldo Mendiola Cing (incumbent) | 652 | 17.10% |
| Nonpartisan | Sylvestre Hofschneider Palacios | 580 | 15.21% |
| Nonpartisan | Deborah Aldan Fleming | 528 | 13.85% |
| Total votes | | 3,813 | 100.00% |

Municipal Council - Rota (non-partisan)
| Party | Candidate | Votes | % |
|---|---|---|---|
| Nonpartisan | Anthony Wayne Barcinas | 1,149 | 29.98% |
| Nonpartisan | Kary John Ramos | 1,007 | 26.27% |
| Nonpartisan | Ivan Jr. Mereb (incumbent) | 927 | 24.18% |
| Nonpartisan | Vanessa Lynn Gogue Charfaruros | 750 | 19.57% |
| Total votes | | 3,833 | 100.00% |

== Board of Education ==
Board of Education - Saipan & Northern Islands (non-partisan)
| Party | Candidate | Votes | % |
|---|---|---|---|
| Nonpartisan | Janice Marie Ada Tenorio | 4,706 | 32.08% |
| Nonpartisan | Marylou Seman Ada | 3,758 | 22.62% |
| Nonpartisan | Andrew Lujan Orsini | 3,280 | 22.36% |
| Nonpartisan | James Michael Rayphand | 2,924 | 19.93% |
| Total votes | | 14,668 | |

Board of Education - Rota (non-partisan)
| Party | Candidate | Votes | % |
|---|---|---|---|
| Nonpartisan | Herman Manglona Ataug | 907 | 61.33% |
| Nonpartisan | Dexter Peter Apatang | 572 | 38.67% |
| Total votes | | 1,479 | 100.0% |

== Judges ==
| Judge | For retention | | Against retention | | Total |
| Judge | Votes | % | Votes | % | Total |
|---|---|---|---|---|---|
| Joseph James Norita Camacho | 9,227 | 78.10% | 2,588 | 21.90% | 11,815 |
