= 2012 Northern Mariana Islands general election =

- 6 November 2012
- Delegate election
- 6 November 2012
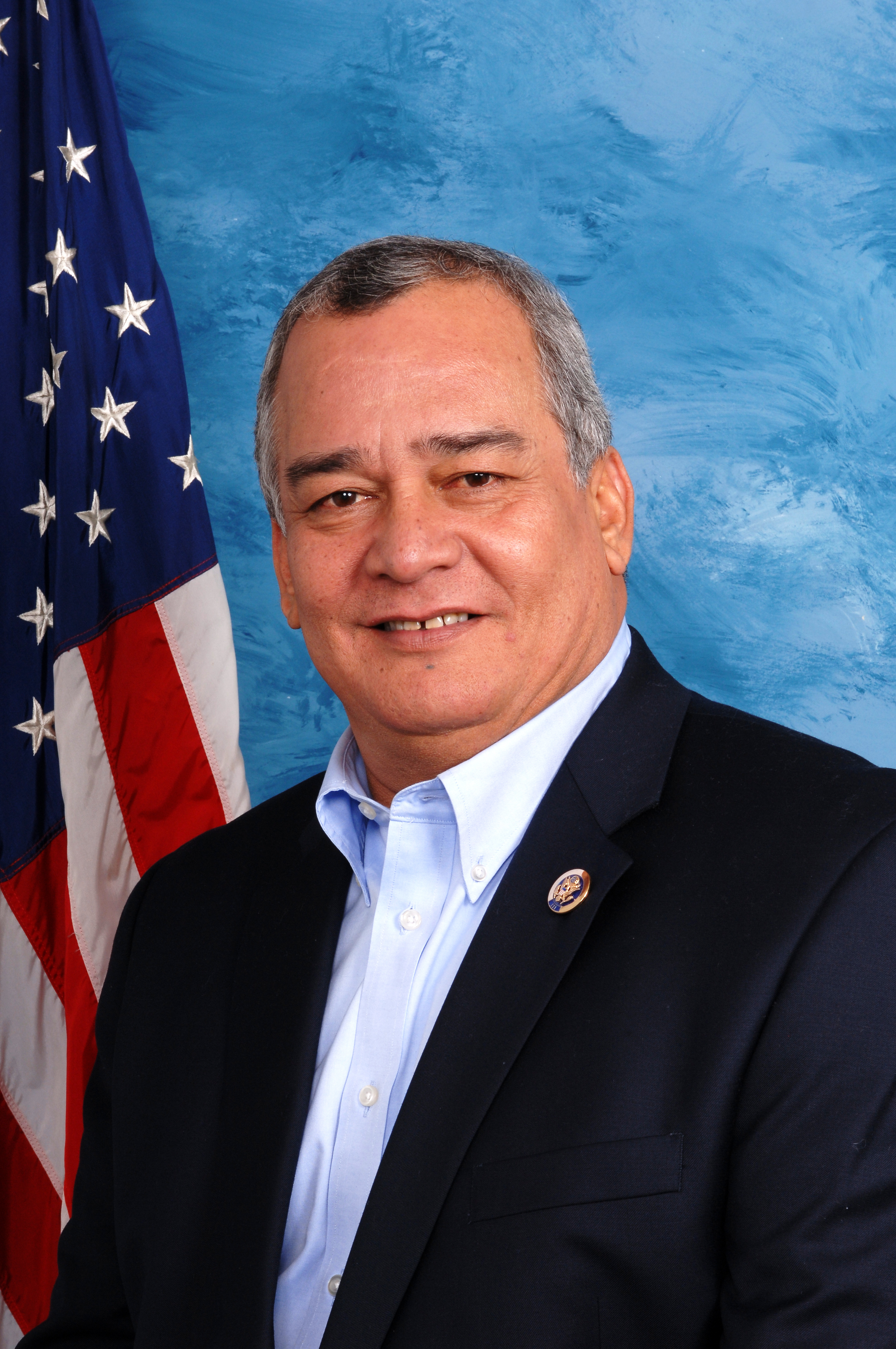

Nominee	Gregorio Sablan	Ignacia Tudela Demapan
Party	Independent	Republican
Popular vote	9,829	2,503
Percentage	79.70%	20.30%
- Results by voting district: Gregorio Sablan: 70–75% 75–80% 80–85% 85–90% >95%
Delegate before election
Gregorio Sablan
Independent
Elected Delegate
Gregorio Sablan
Independent
- Senate election
- 3 of the 9 seats in the Senate; 5 seats needed for a majority
Party	Seats
Republican	5
Independents	4
This lists parties that won seats. See the complete results below.
- House election
- All 20 seats in the House of Representatives; 11 seats needed for a majority
Party	Seats
Independents	12
Republican	4
Covenant	4
This lists parties that won seats. See the complete results below.

The 2012 Northern Mariana Islands general election were held on Tuesday, 6 November 2012. The election coincided with the 2012 United States general elections. Voters in the Northern Mariana Islands voted for the non-voting delegate to the United States House of Representatives, 3 seats in the Northern Mariana Islands Senate, all twenty seats in the Northern Mariana Islands House of Representatives, 4 mayors, seats for the municipal council, seats for the board of education, and 2 judges. Additionally, three referendums were held.

== Delegate to the US House of Representatives ==
Incumbent Delegate Gregorio Kilili Camacho Sablan, an independent who caucuses with the Democratic Party, ran against Republican Candidate Ignacia Tudela Demapan for re-election. Gregorio Sablan, first elected in 2008, had held the seat since its creation in 2009. When Sablan announced his campaign, he drew a crowd including members of the three political parties as well as independents. The politically diverse crowd showed their support to Sablan, displaying unity behind a single candidate. Delegate Gregorio Sablan was re-elected by a massive 60-point spread, with nearly four-fifths of the vote, the largest margin of victory in the history of the Northern Mariana Islands. The Northern Mariana Islands' non-voting delegate to the U.S. House of Representatives was elected for a two-year term. It would be the first time that the election for the CNMI Delegate would be held during the CNMI general elections rather than on its own.

Northern Mariana Islands's at-large congressional district
Party	Candidate	Votes	%	±%
Independent	Gregorio Kilili Camacho Sablan (incumbent)	9,829	79.70%	+36.47%
Republican	Ignacia Tudela Demapan	2,503	20.30%	N/A
Total votes		12,332	100.00%	
Independent hold				

== Northern Mariana Islands Commonwealth Legislature ==
=== Results summary ===
Parties	House Election Results		Seat Change	Party Strength
Parties	2009	2012	+/−	Strength
Independent	4	12	8 ▲	60.00%
Republican	9	4	5 ▼	20.00%
Covenant	7	4	3 ▼	20.00%
Democratic	0	0	Steady	0.00%
Totals	20	20	Steady	100.00%

Parties	Senate Election Results		Seat Change	Party Strength
Parties	2009	2012	+/−	Strength
Republican	5	5	Steady	55.56%
Independent	4	4	Steady	44.44%
Covenant	0	0	Steady	0.00%
Democratic	0	0	Steady	0.00%
Totals	9	9	Steady	100.00%

=== Senate ===
The Northern Mariana Islands Senate is the upper house of the Northern Mariana Islands Commonwealth Legislature, consisting of nine senators representing three senatorial districts (Saipan & the Northern Islands, Tinian & Aguijan, and Rota), each a Multi-member district with three senators. Each district had one seat open for the 2012 elections.

Rota 1st Senatorial District (1 seat)
Party	Candidate	Votes	%
Republican	Victor Borja Hocog	873	57.97%
Independent	Paul Atalig Manglona (incumbent)	633	42.03%
Total votes		1,506	100.00%
Republican gain from Independent			

Tinian 2nd Senatorial District (1 seat)
Party	Candidate	Votes	%
Independent	Francisco Manglona Borja	702	60.94%
Republican	Joaquin Hoashi Borja	450	39.06%
Total votes		1,152	100.00%
Independent gain from Covenant			

Saipan 3rd Senatorial District (1 seat)
Party	Candidate	Votes	%
Independent	Ray Naraja Yumul	3,988	42.53%
Republican	Luis Palacios Crisostimo (incumbent)	2,426	25.87%
Independent	Illuminanda Reyes Bermudes	1,739	18.54%
Covenant	Ana Sablan Teregeyo	1,225	13.06%
Total votes		9,378	100.00%
Independent gain from Republican			

=== House of Representatives ===
The Northern Mariana Islands House of Representatives is the lower house of the Northern Mariana Islands Commonwealth Legislature. The house has seven districts and five of the seven are Multi-member district.

House of Representative - District 1: Saipan (6 seats)
Party	Candidate	Votes	%
Independent	Joseph Pinaula Deleon Guerrero (incumbent)	2,057	12.88%
Independent	Roman Cepeda Benavente	1,989	12.45%
Independent	Janet Ulloa Maratita	1,962	12.28%
Independent	Antonio Pangelinan Sablan (incumbent)	1,932	12.10%
Independent	Mariano Taitano	1,687	10.56%
Republican	Richard Benavente Seman	1,138	7.13%
Covenant	Martin Cabrera Sablan	1,060	6.64%
Republican	Vicente Camacho Cabrera	956	5.99%
Republican	Joseph Mafnas Palacios (incumbent)	867	5.43%
Republican	Eliceo Diaz Cabrera (incumbent)	784	4.91%
Republican	Ramon Concepcion Dela Cruz	782	4.90%
Republican	Jose Tilipao Limes	757	4.74%
Total votes		15,971	100.00%

House of Representative - District 2: Saipan (2 seats)
Party	Candidate	Votes	%
Covenant	John Paul Palacios Sablan	547	28.40%
Covenant	Rafael Sablan Demapan (incumbent)	521	27.05%
Independent	Daniel Jr. Iwashita Aquino	301	15.63%
Republican	Eric Benavente Atalig	278	14.43%
Republican	Liana Sablan Hofschneider	160	8.31%
Independent	Eric Franke Diaz	119	6.18%
Total votes		1,926	100.00%

House of Representative - District 3: Saipan (6 seats)
Party	Candidate	Votes	%
Independent	Ralph Naraja Yumul (incumbent)	1,220	9.64%
Independent	Ramon Angailen Tebuteb (incumbent)	1,138	8.99%
Independent	Francisco Santos Dela Cruz (incumbent)	1,095	8.65%
Covenant	Edmund Joseph Sablan Villagomez (incumbent)	963	7.61%
Independent	Anthony Tenorio Benavente	925	7.31%
Republican	Felicidad Taman Ogumoro (incumbent)	820	6.48%
Republican	Juan Sablan Reyes	802	6.33%
Republican	David Reyes Maratita	785	6.20%
Independent	Mariano Deleon Guerrero Fajardo	768	6.07%
Republican	Jose Pua Saures	762	6.02%
Independent	Ignacio Villagomez Cabrera	738	5.83%
Republican	Roy Taisacan Rios	640	5.05%
Independent	Stanley Estanislao Tudela Mcginnis Torres (incumbent)	629	4.97%
Republican	Jesus Manibusan Castro	609	4.81%
Independent	Raymond Basa Lizama	406	3.21%
Covenant	Brian Ayuyu Torres	362	2.86%
Total votes		12,662	100.00%

House of Representative - District 4: Saipan (2 seats)
Party	Candidate	Votes	%
Covenant	Christopher Duenas Leon Guerrero	639	30.47%
Republican	George Norita Camacho (incumbent)	537	25.61%
Independent	Jesus Jr. Igisomar Wabol	527	25.13%
Republican	Sylvestre Ilo Iguel (incumbent)	394	18.79%
Total votes		2,097	100.00%

House of Representative - District 5: Saipan (2 seats)
Party	Candidate	Votes	%
Independent	Antonio Reyes Agulto	972	30.12%
Independent	Lorenzo Iglecias Deleon Guerrero	900	27.89%
Republican	Ramon Sablan Basa (incumbent)	468	14.50%
Independent	Daniel Ogo Quitugua	458	14.19%
Republican	Frederick Peters Deleon Guerrero (incumbent)	429	13.29%
Total votes		3,227	100.00%

House of Representative - District 6: Tinian (1 seat)
Party	Candidate	Votes	%
Independent	Trenton Brian Conner (incumbent) (Note: Trenton Conner switched his affiliation from Republican to Independent before the elections)	590	51.98%
Republican	Edwin Palacios Aldan	545	48.02%
Total votes		1,135	100.00%
Independent hold			

House of Representative - District 7: Rota (1 seat)
Party	Candidate	Votes	%
Republican	Teresita Apatang Santos (incumbent) (Note: Teresita Santos switched her affiliation from Independent to Republican before the elections)	882	58.96%
Independent	Felix Mundo Santos	614	41.04%
Total votes		1,496	100.00%
Republican hold			

== Municipal Council ==
Municipal Council - Saipan & Northern Islands (non-partisan)
Party	Candidate	Votes	%
Nonpartisan	Ramon Jose Blas Camacho (incumbent)	5,559	51.10%
Nonpartisan	Antonia Manibusan Tudela	5,320	48.90%
Total votes		10,879	100.00%

Municipal Council - Tinian and Aguiguan (non-partisan)
Party	Candidate	Votes	%
Nonpartisan	Antonio San Nicolas Borja	723	21.45%
Nonpartisan	Reynaldo Mendiola Cing	594	17.62%
Nonpartisan	Estevan Pangelinan Cabrera (incumbent)	566	16.79%
Nonpartisan	Patrick A. Manglona (incumbent)	523	15.51%
Nonpartisan	Joseph San Nicolas Cruz (incumbent)	483	14.33%
Nonpartisan	Eugenio Henry Lizama Villagomez	482	14.30%
Total votes		3,371	100.00%

Municipal Council - Rota
Party	Candidate	Votes	%
Nonpartisan	Gardner Trazan Delos Santos Barcinas	865	20.33%
Nonpartisan	Glenn Lizama Maratita	862	20.26%
Nonpartisan	George Ogo Hocog (incumbent)	859	20.19%
Nonpartisan	Prudencio Atalig Manglona (incumbent)	667	15.68%
Nonpartisan	Alexander Apatang	517	12.15%
Nonpartisan	Robert Sikyang Ulloa	484	11.38%
Total votes		4,254	100.00%

== Board of Education ==
Board of Education - Saipan & Northern Islands (non-partisan)
Party	Candidate	Votes	%
Nonpartisan	Janice Marie Ada Tenorio	4,399	30.02%
Nonpartisan	Marylou Seman Ada	4,014	27.40%
Nonpartisan	Victorino Sablan Cepeda	3,790	25.87%
Nonpartisan	Angel Songao Hocog	2,449	16.71%
Total votes		14,652	100.00%

Board of Education - Rota (non-partisan)
Party	Candidate	Votes	%
Nonpartisan	Denise R. King	853	61.46%
Nonpartisan	Dexter Peter Apatang	535	38.54%
Total votes		1,388	100.00%

== Judges ==
Judge	For retention		Against retention		Total
Judge	Votes	%	Votes	%	Total
David Wiseman	9,217	78.42	2,536	21.58	11,753
Perry Inos	9,652	81.62	2,173	18.38	11,825

== Referendum ==
Legislative Initiatives	For		Against		Total
Legislative Initiatives	Votes	%	Votes	%	Votes
17-2, HD3, HS2	9,248	81.63%	2,081	18.37%	
17-12, HD1	10,084	88.38%	1,326	11.62%	
17-5	6,876	62.35%	4,152	37.65%	
