= 2018 Northern Mariana Islands general election =

- Gubernatorial election
- November 13, 2018
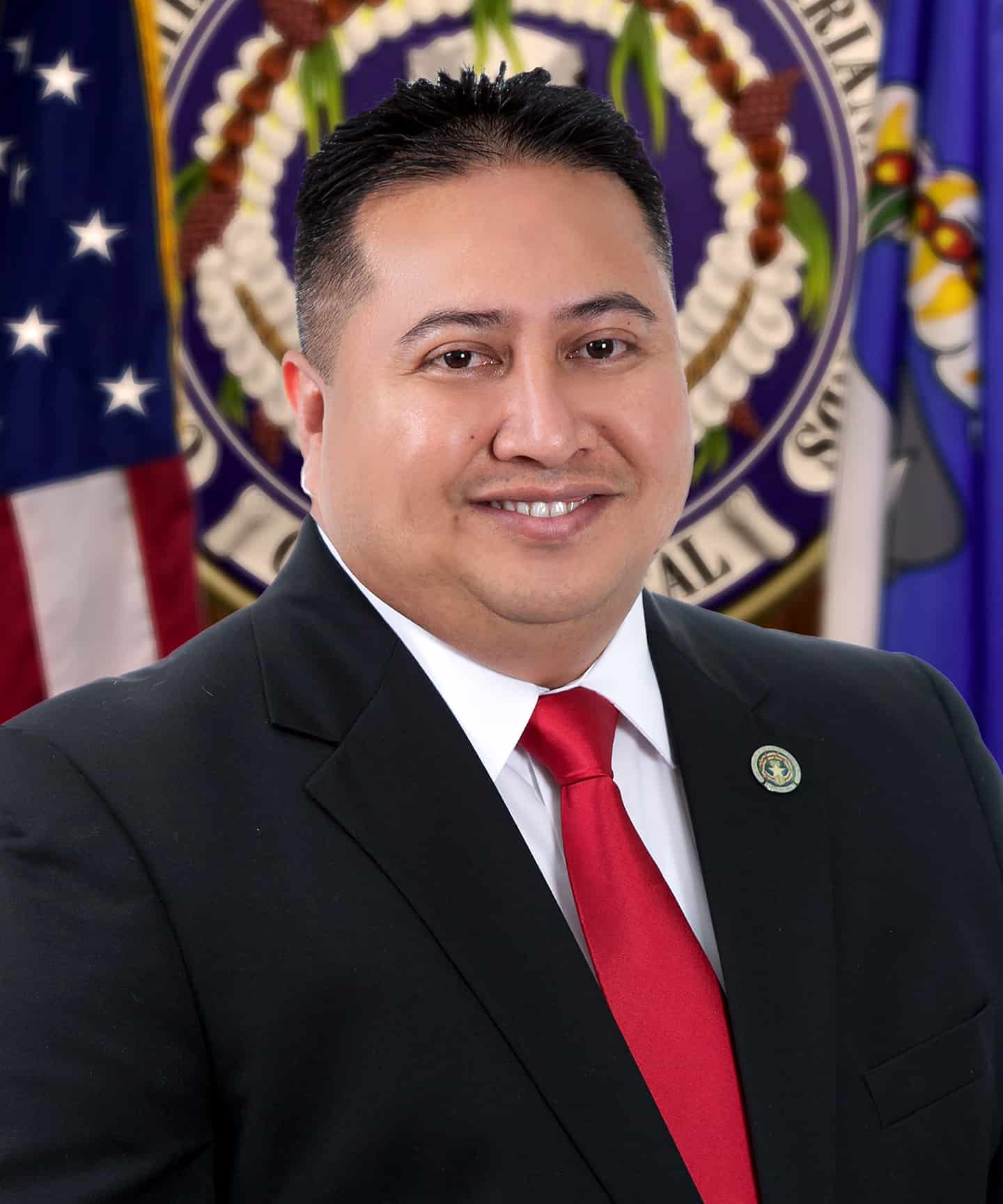

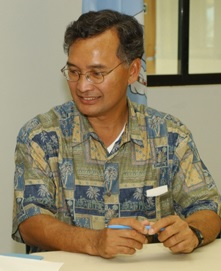
Nominee	Ralph Torres	Juan Nekai Babauta
Party	Republican	Independent
Running mate	Arnold Palacios	Rita Aldan Sablan
Popular vote	8,922	5,420
Percentage	62.21%	37.79%
- Results by voting district: Ralph Torres: 55–60% 60–65% 65–70% 70–75%
Governor before election
Ralph Deleon Guerrero Torres
Republican
Elected Governor
Ralph Deleon Guerrero Torres
Republican
- Delegate election
- November 13, 2018
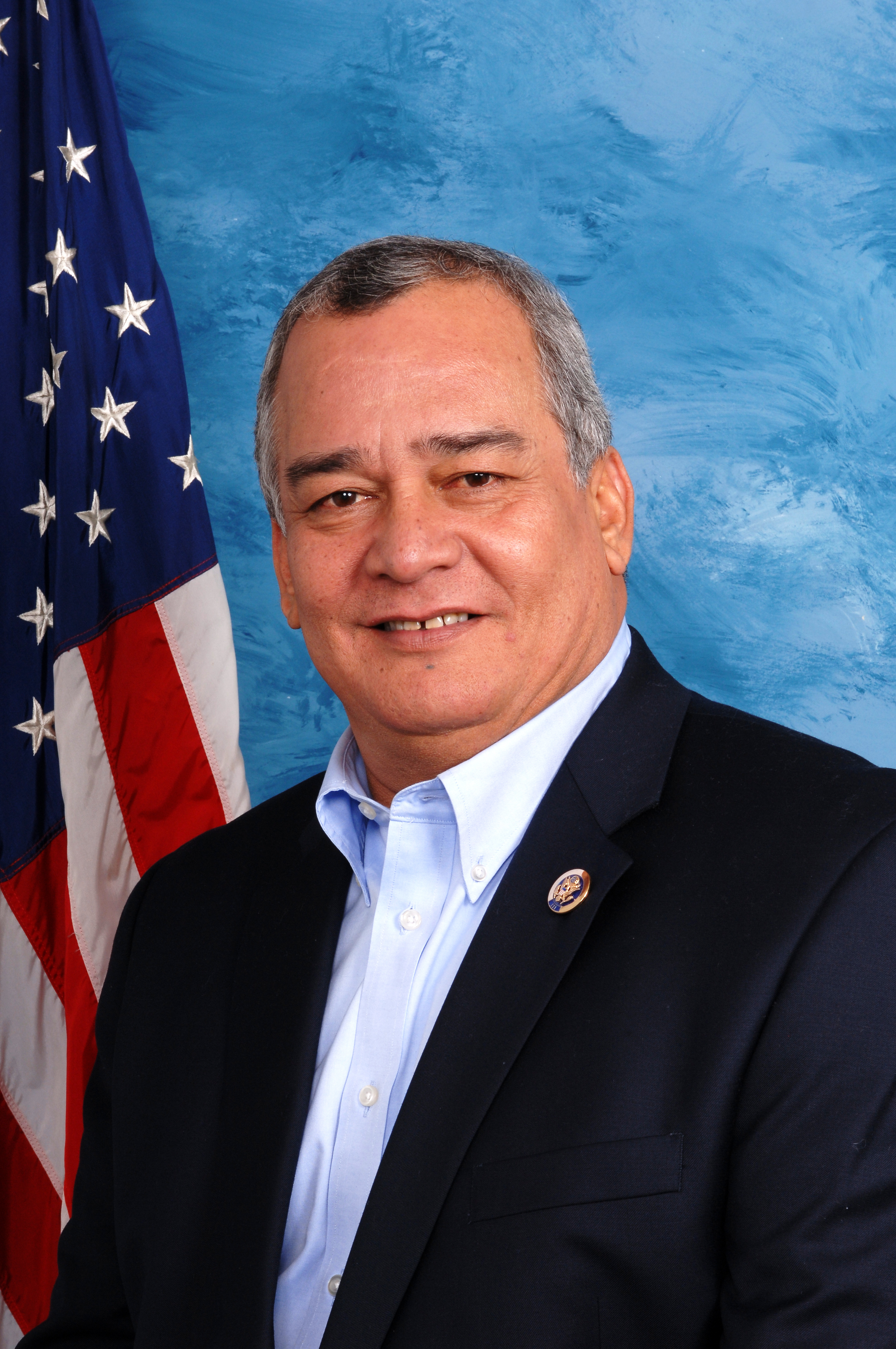

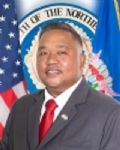
Nominee	Gregorio Sablan	Angel Demapan
Party	Independent	Republican
Popular vote	9,150	5,199
Percentage	63.77%	36.23%
- Results by voting district: Gregorio Sablan: 60–65% 65–70% Angel Demapan: 50–55%
Delegate before election
Gregorio Sablan
Independent
Elected Delegate
Gregorio Sablan
Independent
- Senate election
- 6 of the 9 seats in the Senate; 5 seats needed for a majority
Party	Seats
Republican	6
Independents	3
This lists parties that won seats. See the complete results below.
- House election
- All 20 seats in the House of Representatives; 11 seats needed for a majority
Party	Seats
Republican	13
Independents	7
This lists parties that won seats. See the complete results below.
- Mayoral elections
- 4 mayors
Party	Seats
Republican	3
Independents	1
This lists parties that won seats. See the complete results below.

The 2018 Northern Mariana Islands general election was held on November 13, 2018. Originally scheduled to take place on November 6, 2018 to correspond with the 2018 United States midterm elections, the elections were delayed by one week due to the impact and aftermath of Typhoon Yutu. Early voting was held from November 6-12, 2018. An estimated 18,975 voters were eligible to vote in the 2018 election.

Voters in the Northern Mariana Islands voted for the governor of the Northern Mariana Islands, the non-voting delegate to the United States House of Representatives, attorney general, six seats in the Northern Mariana Islands Senate, all twenty seats in the Northern Mariana Islands House of Representatives, four mayors, seats for the municipal council, seats for the board of education, and two judges.

97 candidates competed for 45 elected positions across the Northern Mariana Islands. High-profile races included the 2018 gubernatorial election between incumbent governor Ralph Torres, a Republican, and former governor Juan Babauta, as well as the race for non-voting delegate to the United States House of Representatives between incumbent Gregorio Sablan and challenger Angel Demapan.

== Gubernatorial election ==
Ralph Deleon Guerrero Torres, the incumbent Republican governor, ran for another term alongside running mate Arnold Indalecio Palacios, and was challenged by former governor and independent Juan Nekai Babauta alongside running mate Rita Aldan Sablan. The gubernatorial contest was held on November 13, 2018, having been delayed one week due to recovery efforts from Typhoon Yutu. Early voting began on November 6. Incumbent Ralph Torres won re-election to his first full term.

=== Candidates ===
==== Independents ====
- Juan Nekai Babauta, former governor of the Northern Mariana Islands (2002–2006), former Resident Representative of the Northern Mariana Islands (1990–2002) and former member of the Northern Mariana Islands Senate (1986–1990)
  - Rita Aldan Sablan, former Education Commissioner

==== Republican Party ====
- Ralph Deleon Guerrero Torres, incumbent governor of the Northern Mariana Islands (serving since 2015), former lieutenant governor (2015), former president of the Northern Mariana Islands Senate (2013–2015), and former chairman of the Health & Welfare Committee (2010–2015)
  - Arnold Indalecio Palacios, former president of the Northern Mariana Islands Senate (2017–2019), former member of the Northern Mariana Islands Senate (2015–2019) former Secretary of Lands and Natural Resources (2012–2015), former Speaker of the House of Representatives of the Northern Mariana Islands (2008–2010)

=== Results ===
Northern Mariana Islands gubernatorial election
Party	Candidate	Running mate	Results	
Party	Candidate	Running mate	Votes	%
Republican	Ralph Deleon Guerrero Torres (incumbent)	Arnold Indalecio Palacios	8,922	62.21%
Independent	Juan Nekai Babauta	Rita Aldan Sablan	5,420	37.79%
Total			14,342	100%
Republican hold				

== Delegate to the US House of Representatives ==
Incumbent delegate Gregorio Sablan, an independent who caucuses with the Democratic Party, ran against Angel Aldan Demapan for re-election. Sablan, first elected in 2008, had held the seat since its creation in 2009. Delegate Gregorio Sablan was re-elected. The Northern Mariana Islands' non-voting delegate to the U.S. House of Representatives was elected for a two-year term.

Northern Mariana Islands's at-large congressional district
Party	Candidate	Votes	%	±%
Independent	Gregorio Kilili Camacho Sablan (incumbent)	9,150	63.77%	−36.23%
Republican	Angel Aldan Demapan	5,199	36.23%	N/A
Total votes		14,349	100.00%	
Independent hold				

== Northern Mariana Islands Commonwealth Legislature ==
=== Results summary ===
Parties	House election results		Seat change	Party strength
Parties	2016	2018	+/−	Party strength
Republican	14	13	1 ▼	65.00%
Independent	6	7	1 ▲	35.00%
Democratic	0	0	Steady	0.00%
Totals	20	20	Steady	100.00%

Parties	Senate election results		Seat change	Party strength
Parties	2016	2018	+/−	Party strength
Republican	7	6	1 ▼	66.67%
Independent	2	3	1 ▲	33.33%
Democratic	0	0	Steady	0.00%
Totals	9	9	Steady	100.00%

=== Senate ===
The Northern Mariana Islands Senate is the upper house of the Northern Mariana Islands Commonwealth Legislature, consisting of nine senators representing three senatorial districts (Saipan & the Northern Islands, Tinian & Aguijan, and Rota), each a multi-member district with three senators. Each district had two seats open for the 2018 elections.

Rota 1st Senatorial District (2 seats)
Party	Candidate	Votes	%
Independent	Teresita Apatang Santos (incumbent)	628	21.55%
Republican	Victor Borja Hocog	570	19.56%
Republican	Felix Mundo Santos	540	18.53%
Independent	Albert Atalig Taitano	442	15.17%
Independent	Joel Gogue Charfauros	396	13.59%
Independent	Jovita Maratita Taimanao	338	11.60%
Total votes		2,914	100.00%

Tinian 2nd Senatorial District (2 seats)
Party	Candidate	Votes	%
Republican	Francisco Quichuchu Cruz (incumbent)	1,035	38.07%
Republican	Jude Untalan Hofschneider (incumbent)	918	33.76%
Independent	Juanita Masga Mendiola	443	16.29%
Independent	Eric Henry Cruz San Nicolas	323	11.88%
Total votes		2,719	100.00%

Saipan 3rd Senatorial District (2 seats)
Party	Candidate	Votes	%
Independent	Vinnie Vinson Flores Sablan	6,076	28.89%
Republican	Justo Songao Quitugua (incumbent)	4,729	22.48%
Republican	Joseph Pinaula Deleon Guerrero	3,941	18.74%
Independent	Heinz Sablan Hofschneider	3,813	18.13%
Independent	Edith E. Deleon Guerrero	2,473	11.76%
Total votes		21,032	

=== House of Representatives ===
The Northern Mariana Islands House of Representatives is the lower house of the Northern Mariana Islands Commonwealth Legislature. The house has seven districts, five of which are multi-member districts. All 20 seats were up for the 2018 elections.

House of Representative - District 1: Saipan (6 seats)
Party	Candidate	Votes	%
Independent	Edwin Kenneth Propst (incumbent)	2,639	13.48%
Independent	Joseph Arriola Flores	1,965	10.03%
Republican	Joseph Leepan Tenorio Guerrero (incumbent)	1,931	9.86%
Republican	Janet Ulloa Maratita (incumbent)	1,731	8.84%
Republican	Luis John Deleion Guerrero Castro	1,645	8.40%
Republican	Roman Cepeda Benavente	1,534	7.83%
Independent	Franklin Reyes Babauta	1,520	7.76%
Republican	Raymond Ulloa Palacios	1,490	7.61%
Independent	Lino Sablan Tenorio	1,480	7.56%
Independent	Samatha A'Ani Birmingham-Babauta	1,304	6.66%
Republican	Gregorio Jr. Muna Sablan (incumbent)	1,198	6.12%
Democratic	Glenn Hocog Manglona	766	3.91%
Independent	Dorotheo Anthony Kisa	381	1.95%
Total votes		19,584	100.00%

House of Representative - District 2: Saipan (2 seats)
Party	Candidate	Votes	%
Independent	Christina Marie Elise Sablan	629	30.37%
Republican	John Paul Palacios Sablan (incumbent)	550	26.56%
Republican	Rafael Sablan Demapan (incumbent)	532	25.69%
Independent	Isabel Pangelinan Matsunaga	360	17.38%
Total votes		2,071	100.00%

House of Representative - District 3: Saipan (6 seats)
Party	Candidate	Votes	%
Independent	Edmund Joseph Sablan Villagomez (incumbent)	1,709	11.90%
Republican	Ivan Alafanson Blanco (incumbent)	1,661	11.56%
Republican	Blas Jonathan "BJ" Tenorio Attao (incumbent)	1,636	11.39%
Republican	Ralph Naraja Yumul	1,427	9.93%
Republican	Francisco Santos Dela Cruz (incumbent)	1,215	8.46%
Republican	Jose Ilo Itibus (incumbent)	1,200	8.35%
Republican	Donald Cabrera Barcinas (incumbent)	1,103	7.68%
Independent	David Castro Sablan	974	6.78%
Independent	Mariano Deleon Guerrero Fajardo	958	6.67%
Independent	Vicente Castro Camacho	926	6.45%
Independent	Luis Selepeo Tilipao	825	5.74%
Independent	Stanley Estanislao Tudela McGinnis Torres	733	5.10%
Total votes		14,367	100.00%

House of Representative - District 4: Saipan (2 seats)
Party	Candidate	Votes	%
Independent	Sheila Therese Jack Babauta	943	33.67%
Republican	Joel Castro Camacho	823	
Independent	Malcolm Jason Omar	548	19.56%
Republican	Alice Santos Igitol (incumbent)	487	17.39%
Total votes		2,801	100.00%

House of Representative - District 5: Saipan (2 seats)
Party	Candidate	Votes	%
Republican	Lorenzo Iglecias Deleon Guerrero (incumbent)	977	25.58%
Independent	Richard Tudela Lizama	868	22.73%
Republican	Francisco Concepcion Aguon (incumbent)	855	22.39%
Independent	Juan Cepeda Deleon Guerrero	598	15.66%
Democratic	Peter Francis Reyes Muna	521	13.64%
Total votes		3,819	100.00%

House of Representative - District 6: Tinian (1 seat)
Party	Candidate	Votes	%
Republican	Antonio San Nicolas Borja	825	59.87%
Independent	Frederick Arend Dela Cruz	553	40.13%
Total votes		1,378	100.00%
Republican hold			

House of Representative - District 7: Rota (1 seat)
Party	Candidate	Votes	%
Independent	Donald Manalang Manglona	765	48.57%
Republican	Glenn Lizama Maratita (incumbent)	631	40.06%
Independent	Thomas Taimanao Atalig	179	11.37%
Total votes		1,575	100.00%
Independent gain from Republican			

== Mayors ==
All four mayoral posts were up for election across the Commonwealth.

Mayor - Saipan
Party	Candidate	Votes	%
Republican	David Mundo Apatang (incumbent) (Note: David Apatang switched his affiliation from Independent to Republican before the elections.)	8,492	78.60%
Independent	Ramon RB Jose Camacho	2,741	24.40%
Total votes		11,233	100.00%
Republican hold			

Mayor - Tinian
Party	Candidate	Votes	%
Republican	Edwin Palacios Aldan	879	62.70%
Independent	Henry Hofschneider San Nicolas	523	37.30%
Total votes		1,402	100.00%
Republican hold			

Mayor - Rota
Party	Candidate	Votes	%
Republican	Efrain Manglona Atalig (incumbent)	576	35.91%
Independent	Julie Marie Ogo Manglona	487	30.36%
Independent	Steven King Mesngon	345	21.51%
Independent	Crispin Masha Ayuyu	135	8.42%
Independent	Richard Evanglista Taisacan	61	3.80%
Total votes		1,604	100.00%
Republican hold			

Mayor - Northern Islands
Party	Candidate	Votes	%
Independent	Vincente Jr. Cruz Santos	85	57.05%
Republican	Diego Litulumar Kaipat	64	42.95%
Total votes		149	100.00%
Independent gain from Republican			

== Attorney General ==
Attorney General (non-partisan)
Party	Candidate	Votes	%
Nonpartisan	Edward Eladio Manibusan (incumbent)	11,366	100.00%
Total votes		11,366	100.00%

== Municipal Council ==
Municipal Council - Saipan & Northern Islands (non-partisan)
Party	Candidate	Votes	%
Nonpartisan	Debra Lynn Tenorio Camacho	7,073	28.70%
Nonpartisan	Antonia Manibusan Tudela	6,480	26.29%
Nonpartisan	Ana Demapan Castro	5,926	24.04%
Nonpartisan	Thomas Sablan Muna	5,167	20.96%
Total votes		24,646	100.00%

Municipal Council - Tinian & Aguiguan (non-partisan)
Party	Candidate	Votes	%
Nonpartisan	Esteven Jr. San Nicolas King	853	20.90%
Nonpartisan	Thomasa Rita Palacios Mendiola	840	20.58%
Nonpartisan	Patrick Aquiningoc Manglona	807	19.77%
Nonpartisan	Nikita Palacios Mendiola	622	15.24%
Nonpartisan	Ervin Jon Jr. Cepeda Cruz	501	12.27%
Nonpartisan	Joseph Jr. Agulto Borja	459	11.24%
Total votes		4,082	100.00%

Municipal Council - Rota (non-partisan)
Party	Candidate	Votes	%
Nonpartisan	Lucia Songsong Manglona	957	24.37%
Nonpartisan	Anthony Wayne Barcinas (incumbent)	840	21.39%
Nonpartisan	Simeon Evangelista Taisacan	773	19.68%
Nonpartisan	Alexander Apatang	760	19.35%
Nonpartisan	George Ogo Hocog	597	15.20%
Total votes		3,927	100.00%

== Board of Education ==
Board of Education - Saipan & Northern Islands (non-partisan)
Party	Candidate	Votes	%
Nonpartisan	Andrew Lujan Orsini	5,222	51.15%
Nonpartisan	James Michael Rayphand	4,988	48.85%
Total votes		10,210	100.00%

== Judges ==
Judge	For retention		Against retention		Total
Judge	Votes	%	Votes	%	Total
Alexander C. Castro	11,644	86.69%	1,788	13.31%	13,432
Teresa K. Tenorio	11,188	84.55%	2,044	15.45%	13,232
