= 2007 Northern Mariana Islands general election =

- 3 November 2007
- Senate election
- 3 of the 9 seats in the Senate; 5 seats needed for a majority
Party	Seats
Covenant	3
Independents	3
Republican	2
Democratic	1
This lists parties that won seats. See the complete results below.
- House election
- All 20 seats in the House of Representatives; 11 seats needed for a majority
Party	Seats
Republican	12
Covenant	4
Independents	3
Democratic	1
This lists parties that won seats. See the complete results below.

The 2007 Northern Mariana Islands general election was held on Saturday, 3 November 2007. Voters in the Northern Mariana Islands voted for three seats in the Northern Mariana Islands Senate, all twenty seats in the Northern Mariana Islands House of Representatives, seats for the municipal council, seats for the board of education, a justice, and three judges. Additionally, four referendums were held.

The Republican Party won a majority of seats in the House of Representatives, and both referendums were approved. This election would mark the last time that the Democrats would win a legislative seat until the 2020 general election.

== Background ==
The two referendums were on proposed amendments to the constitution. One would amend Chapter XV, article 2, section a to establish a new Higher Education Commission to license post-secondary educational institutions. The other would amend Chapter III, article 4 to require a second round in the elections for governor and lieutenant governor if no candidate received over 50% in the first round.

== Northern Mariana Islands Commonwealth Legislature ==
=== Results summary ===
Parties	House Election Results		Seat Change	Party Strength
Parties	2005	2007	+/−	Strength
Republican	7	12	5 ▲	60.00%
Covenant	7	4	3 ▼	20.00%
Independent	2	3	1 ▲	15.00%
Democratic	2	1	1 ▼	5.00%
Totals	18	20	2 ▲	100.00%

Parties	Senate Election Results		Seat Change	Party Strength
Parties	2005	2007	+/−	Strength
Covenant	3	3	Steady	33.33%
Independent	1	3	2 ▲	33.33%
Republican	3	2	1 ▼	22.22%
Democratic	2	1	1 ▼	11.11%
Totals	9	9	Steady	100.00%

=== Senate ===
The Northern Mariana Islands Senate is the upper house of the Northern Mariana Islands Commonwealth Legislature, consisting of nine senators representing three senatorial districts (Saipan & the Northern Islands, Tinian & Aguijan, and Rota), each a Multi-member district with three senators. Each district had one seat open for the 2007 elections.

Rota 1st Senatorial District (1 seat)
Party	Candidate	Votes	%
Independent	Paul Atalig Manglona	812	62.32%
Covenant	Crispin Manglona Ogo	491	37.68%
Total votes		1,303	100.00%

Tinian 2nd Senatorial District (1 seat)
Party	Candidate	Votes	%
Covenant	Henry Hofschneider San Nicolas	599	55.93%
Republican	Trenton Brian Conner	460	42.95%
Independent	Ramon Matagolai Sakisat	12	1.12%
Total votes		1,071	100.00%

Saipan 3rd Senatorial District (1 seat)
Party	Candidate	Votes	%
Independent	Luis Palacios Crisostimo	2,325	26.10%
Republican	Andrew Sablan Salas	2,260	25.37%
Independent	Claudio Kotomar Norita	2,082	23.37%
Covenant	Ramon Santos Dela Cruz	1,384	15.53%
Democratic	Gabriel Boki Babauta	858	9.63%
Total votes		8,909	100.00%

=== House of Representatives ===
The Northern Mariana Islands House of Representatives is the lower house of the Northern Mariana Islands Commonwealth Legislature. The house has seven districts and five of the seven are Multi-member district. This election saw an increase in the number of seats in the House, from 18 in 2005 to 20. All 20 seats in the Northern Mariana Islands House of Representatives were contested in the 2007 election.

House of Representative - District 1: Saipan (6 seats)
Party	Candidate	Votes	%
Republican	Ralph Deleon Guerrero Torress	2,207	14.56%
Independent	David Mundo Apatang	1,884	12.43%
Republican	Diego Tenorio Benavente	1,681	11.09%
Republican	Joseph Pinaula Deleon Guerrero	1,427	9.42%
Republican	Joseph Castro Reyes	1,219	8.04%
Independent	Christina Marie Elise Sablan	1,007	6.64%
Independent	Janet Ulloa Maratita	975	6.43%
Independent	Jacinta Matagolai Kaipat	929	6.13%
Republican	Lars Indalecio Palacios	751	4.96%
Covenant	Rose Nelly Taman Ada-Hocog	678	4.47%
Independent	Jose Sablan Demapan	670	4.42%
Independent	Pedro Cabrera Sablan	582	3.84%
Democratic	Ronnie Lizama Aguon	512	3.38%
Independent	Juan Mafnas Santos	364	2.40%
Independent	John Jack Anthony Angello	269	1.77%
Total votes		15,155	100.00%

House of Representative - District 2: Saipan (2 seats)
Party	Candidate	Votes	%
Covenant	Oscar Manglona Babauta	383	23.97%
Covenant	Raymond Demapan Palacios	381	23.84%
Republican	Manuel Agulto Tenorio	378	23.65%
Democratic	Henry Ayuyu Torres	159	9.95%
Independent	Daniel Jr. Iwashita Aquino	155	9.70%
Republican	Henry Manglona Sablan	142	8.89%
Total votes		1,598	100.00%

House of Representative - District 3: Saipan (6 seats)
Party	Candidate	Votes	%
Republican	Heinz Sablan Hofschneider	1,520	14.37%
Republican	Arnold Indalecio Palacios	1,442	13.63%
Republican	Ramon Angailen Tebuteb	1,223	11.56%
Republican	Ray Naraja Yumul	1,208	11.42%
Republican	Stanley Estanislao Tudela McGinnis Torres	1,200	11.34%
Covenant	Francisco Santos Dela Cruz	1,109	10.48%
Independent	Absalon Jr. Victor Waki	1,093	10.33%
Covenant	David Reyes Maratita	915	8.65%
Independent	Pedro Terlaje Untalan	869	8.21%
Total votes		10,579	100.00%

House of Representative - District 4: Saipan (2 seats)
Party	Candidate	Votes	%
Republican	Joseph James Norita Camacho	874	41.48%
Democratic	Justo Songao Quitugua	639	30.33%
Republican	Sylvestre Ilo Iguel	594	28.19%
Total votes		2,107	100.00%

House of Representative - District 5: Saipan (2 seats)
Party	Candidate	Votes	%
Republican	Rosemond Blanco Santos	589	20.77%
Republican	Edward Tudela Salas	487	17.17%
Independent	Fredrick Peters Deleon Guerrero	484	17.07%
Democratic	Antonio Muna Camacho	243	8.57%
Covenant	Ramon Sablan Basa	241	8.50%
Independent	Martin Borja Ada	234	8.25%
Democratic	Pedro Cogure Arriola	222	7.83%
Covenant	Jesus Camacho Muna	186	6.56%
Independent	Gregorio Sanchez Cruz	150	5.29%
Total votes		2,836	100.00%

House of Representative - District 6: Tinian (1 seat)
Party	Candidate	Votes	%
Covenant	Edwin Palacios Aldan	547	51.65%
Republican	Anthony Untalan Hofschneider	512	48.35%
Total votes		1,059	100.00%

House of Representative - District 7: Rota (1 seat)
Party	Candidate	Votes	%
Independent	Victor Borja Hocog	799	61.99%
Independent	Felix Mundo Santos	490	38.01%
Total votes		1,289	100.00%

== Municipal Council ==
Municipal Council - Saipan & Northern Islands (non-partisan)
Party	Candidate	Votes	%
Nonpartisan	Antonia Manibusan Tudela	5,222	41.93%
Nonpartisan	Ramon Jose Blas Camacho	4,254	34.15
Nonpartisan	Felipe Quitugua Atalig	2,979	23.92%
Total votes		12,455	100.00%

Municipal Council - Tinian and Aguiguan (non-partisan)
Party	Candidate	Votes	%
Nonpartisan	Eugenio Henry Lizama Villagomez	695	24.24%
Nonpartisan	Antonio Hoashi Borja	691	24.10%
Nonpartisan	Charlene Manglona Lizama	606	21.14%
Nonpartisan	Trinidad Cepeda Reyes	447	15.59%
Nonpartisan	Jose Jr. Boki Evangelista	428	14.93%
Total votes		2,867	100.00%

Municipal Council - Rota (non-partisan)
Party	Candidate	Votes	%
Nonpartisan	Vicente Mendiola Calvo	972	29.99%
Nonpartisan	Alfred Jr. Maratita Apatang	828	25.55%
Nonpartisan	Roy James Atalig Masga	786	24.25%
Nonpartisan	Tom Glen A. Quitugua	655	20.21%
Total votes		3,241	100.00%

== Board of Education ==
Board of Education - Saipan & Northern Islands (non-partisan)
Party	Candidate	Votes	%
Nonpartisan	Galvin Johnathan Sablan Deleon Guerrero	4,953	37.49%
Nonpartisan	Marylou Seman Ada	4,856	36.75%
Nonpartisan	Roman Cepeda Benavente	3,403	25.76%
Total votes		13,212	100.00%

Board of Education - Rota (non-partisan)
Party	Candidate	Votes	%
Nonpartisan	Denise R. King	782	61.33%
Nonpartisan	Laura Inos Manglona	493	38.67%
Total votes		1,275	100.00%

== Justices ==
Justice	For retention		Against retention		Total
Justice	Votes	%	Votes	%	Total
John Atalig Manglona	7,931	75.34%	2,596	24.66%	10,527

== Judges ==
Judge	For retention		Against retention		Total
Judge	Votes	%	Votes	%	Total
Kenneth Lewis Govendo	7,353	72.63%	2,771	27.37%	10,124
Ramona "Mona" Villagomez Mangloña	8,398	79.72%	2,137	20.28%	10,535
Robert Camacho Naraja	7,110	68.50%	3,270	31.50%	10,380

== Referendums ==
Referendum Questions	For		Against	
Referendum Questions	Votes	%	Votes	%
House Legislative Initiative 15-1 (Establishing a new Higher Education Commission)	6,619	64.03%	3,718	35.97%
Two-round elections for Governor:(House Legislative Initiative 15-16, SD1)	7,671	73.12%	2,820	26.88%
Rota Casino Act of 2007	1,095	85.41%	187	14.59%
Saipan Casino Act	3,701	41.93%	5,125	58.07%
