= 1995 Northern Mariana Islands parliamentary expenses referendum =

Ballot measure in the Northern Mariana Islands

A referendum on increasing the budget of the Legislature was held in the Northern Mariana Islands on 4 November 1995. The proposal was rejected by voters.

== Background ==
The proposal had been approved by a three-quarter majority in both houses of the Legislature, and required only a simple majority of votes in the referendum to be approved. It would have amended Chapter II, article 16 of the constitution, raising the Legislature's budget from $6 million to $8 million.
