= 1989 Northern Mariana Islands constitutional referendum =

Ballot measure in the Northern Mariana Islands

A constitutional referendum was held in the Northern Mariana Islands on 4 November 1989. Voters were asked whether they approved of two amendments to the constitution. One on putting a limit on spending by the Legislature was approved, whilst the other was rejected.

== Background ==
The proposal to amend the constitution to put a limit on spending was an initiative in the Legislature, and was passed by a three quarter majority in both houses. This meant that only a simple majority was required in the referendum.

It proposed amending Chapter II, sections 16 and 17 to read:

Section 16. Budget Ceiling. There shall be a ceiling on the budget of the legislature.

a) Appropriations, or obligations and expenditures, exclusive of the salaries of the members of the legislature, for the operations and activities of the legislature may not exceed two million eight hundred thousand dollars in any fiscal year. This ceiling on the legislative budget shall be divided equally between the Senate and the House of Representatives.
b) Obligations and expenditures for the operations and activities of the legislature for the period Gctober I through the second Monday in January of a fiscal year in which there is a regular general election, may not exceed seven hundred thousand dollars or the spending authority otherwise available by law, whichever is less. This ceiling shall apply to the various offices and activities in the same proportions as the annual spending authority provided by law.

Section 17. Legislative Bureau. There is hereby established a legislative bureau in the Northern Marianas Commonwealth Legislature.

a) The bureau shall be headed by a director to be appointed by the joint leadership of the legislature consisting of the presiding officers, vice presiding officers, floor leaders, and the chairmen of the standing committees.
b) The director shall employ all necessary staff, other than personal staff of the members of the legislature, pursuant to budgetary allocations. The staff members shall include legal counsel and other administrative staff.
c) The bureau shall provide all required services to the legislature in connection with duties and responsibilities during sessions and committee meetings. It shall maintain all records, files, library and other documents of the legislature.
d) The director may be removed by a rnajority of the members of each house of the legislature with or without cause.
e) The bureau shall be free from any political harassment or pressure.
f) The legislative bureau shall have a budget sufficient to permit it to fully and adequately perform its duties as specified in this Section. The funds budgeted shall be independent of the budget ceiling established for the legislature under Section 16 of this Article, but in no event shall the funds appropriated exceed eight hundred thousand dollars in any fiscal year.
