= 1997 Northern Mariana Islands constitutional referendum =

Ballot measures in the Northern Mariana Islands

A three-part constitutional referendum was held in the Northern Mariana Islands on 1 November 1997. All three proposals were approved by voters.

== Background ==
All three proposals had been approved by a three-quarter majority in both houses of the Commonwealth Legislature.

== Proposed changes ==
=== Chapter II, Articles 16 and 17 ===
Chapter II, article 16 would be amended to read:

There shall be a ceiling on the budget of the legislature.

a) Appropriations, or obligations and expenditures, for the operations and activities of the legislature and legislative bureau, other than the salaries of members of the legislature, any payments required by law to be made as an employer contribution to any Commonwealth government retirement fund, and major capital improvement projects, may not exceed in any fiscal year the budget ceiling provided in this section.

g) Obligations and expenditures for the operations and activities of the legislature for the period October 1 through the second Monday in January of a fiscal year in which there is a regular general election may not exceed seven hundred thousand dollars or twenty provided by law consistent with this section. This ceiling shall apply to the various offices and activities in the same proportions as the annual spending authority provided by law consistent with this section.

It also involved deleting Chapter II, article 17, section f.

=== Chapter III, article 20 ===
Section b of Chapter III, article 20 would be amended to read:

An employee who has acquired not less than twenty years of creditable service under the Commonwealth retirement system shall be credited an additional five years and shall be eligible to retire. An employee who elects to retire under this provision may not be reemployed by the Commonwealth Government or any of its instrumentalities or agencies, for more than 60 days in any fiscal year without losing his or her retirement benefits for the remainder of that fiscal year, except that the legislature may by law exempt reemployment of retirees as classroom teachers, doctors, nurses, and other medical professionals from this limitation, for reemployment not exceeding two (2) years. No retiree may have their retirement benefits recomputed based on any reemployment during which retirement benefits are drawn, but every such reemployed retiree shall nevertheless be required to contribute to the retirement fund during the period of reemployment, at the same rate as other government employees. The legislature may prohibit recomputation of retirement benefits based on reemployment after retirement in any event or under any circumstances.

=== Chapter IV ===
The proposed amendments to Chapter IV were intended to ensure that federal courts had a constitutional basis, and to clarify their powers and procedures.
