= 1999 Northern Mariana Islands constitutional referendum =

Ballot measure in the Northern Mariana Islands

A constitutional referendum was held in the Northern Mariana Islands on 6 November 1995. Voters were asked whether they approved of two proposed amendments to the constitution; one limiting the rights to vote on constitutional amendments that affected land ownership to native islanders, and one on establishing an Office of Finance to regulate the spending of the Legislature. The first proposal was approved by voters and the second rejected.

== Background ==
Both proposals had been approved by a three-quarter majority in both houses of the Legislature, and required only a simple majority of votes in the referendum to be approved.

== Results ==
=== Voting rights in constitutional referendums ===
Do you approve the proposed constitutional amendment by legislative initiative entitled 'To amend Article XVIII, section 5 of the Commonwealth Constitution to provide that only persons of Northern Marianas descent can vote on constitutional amendments affecting the protections against alienation of land in Article XII of the Constitution?

Choice	Votes	%
For	5,930	54.70
Against	4,910	45.30
Total	10,840	100.00
Registered voters/turnout	14,325	–
Source: Direct Democracy

=== Establishing an Office of Finance ===
Do you approve the proposed constitutional amendment by legislative initiative entitled 'To amend Article II section 17 of the Commonwealth Constitution to establish an office of finance within the Legislative Bureau to control and regulate the expenditure of public funds by legislative branch;

to amend Article IV Section 9 of the Commonwealth Constitution establish an office of finance within the Judicial Branch to control and regulate the expenditure of public funds by the Judicial Branch;

and to amend Article X Section 8 of the Commonwealth Constitution to remove the Department of Finance's control and regulation of public funds appropriated to the legislative branch and judicial branch respectively?

The proposal was rejected by voters.
