= 2003 Northern Mariana Islands general election =

- 5 November 2005
- Senate election
- 3 of the 9 seats in the Senate; 5 seats needed for a majority
Party	Seats
Covenant	3
Republican	2
Democratic	2
Independents	2
This lists parties that won seats. See the complete results below.
- House election
- All 18 seats in the House of Representatives; 10 seats needed for a majority
Party	Seats
Covenant	9
Republican	7
Democratic	1
Independents	1
This lists parties that won seats. See the complete results below.

The 2003 Northern Mariana Islands general election was held on Monday, 3 November 2003, electing members to the legislature. The 2003 elections also marked the first general election that the dissolved Reform Party, which merged back into the Democratic Party in 2002, would not appear on the ballot.

== Northern Mariana Islands Commonwealth Legislature ==
=== Results summary ===
Parties	House Election Results		Seat Change	Party Strength
Parties	2001	2003	+/−	Strength
Covenant	1	9	8 ▲	50.00%
Republican	16	7	9 ▼	38.89%
Independent	0	1	1 ▲	5.56%
Democratic	1	1	Steady	5.56%
Totals	18	18	Steady	100.00%

Parties	Senate Election Results			Seat Change	Party Strength
Parties	2001	2002	2003	+/−	Strength
Covenant	1	1	3	2 ▲	33.33%
Republican	5	5	2	3 ▼	22.22%
Democratic	2	3 ▲	2	1 ▼	22.22%
Independent	0	0	2	2 ▲	22.22%
Reform	1	0 ▼	0	0	0.00%
Totals	9	9	Steady	100.00%	

=== Senate ===
==== Regular elections ====
The Northern Mariana Islands Senate is the upper house of the Northern Mariana Islands Commonwealth Legislature, consisting of nine senators representing three senatorial districts (Saipan & the Northern Islands, Tinian & Aguijan, and Rota), each a Multi-member district with three senators. Each district had one seat open for the 2003 elections.

District	Candidate	Votes	%
Rota 1st Senatorial District	Paul Atalig Manglona	719	57.25
Rota 1st Senatorial District	Manases Manglona Barcinas	537	42.75
Tinian 2nd Senatorial District	Henry Hofschneider San Nicolas	615	67.96
Tinian 2nd Senatorial District	David Mendiola Cing	290	32.04
Saipan 3rd Senatorial District	Luis Palacios Crisostimo	2,275	33.30
Saipan 3rd Senatorial District	Jose Camacho Mafnas	1,787	26.16
Saipan 3rd Senatorial District	Andrew Sablan Salas	1,348	19.73
Saipan 3rd Senatorial District	Ramon Santos Deleon Guerrero	1,318	19.29
Saipan 3rd Senatorial District	Joaquin Terlaje Quitugua	103	1.51

==== Special elections ====
District	Candidate	Votes	%
Rota 1st Senatorial District	Paterno Songao Hocog	652	51.34
Rota 1st Senatorial District	Juan Masga Ayuyu	448	35.28
Rota 1st Senatorial District	Fermina Manglona Atalig	170	13.39
Tinian 2nd Senatorial District	Joseph Masga Mendiola	555	61.60
Tinian 2nd Senatorial District	Manuel Pangelinan Villagomez	346	38.40

=== House of Representatives ===
The Northern Mariana Islands House of Representatives is the lower house of the Northern Mariana Islands Commonwealth Legislature. The house has six districts, several of which are Multi-member district. All 18 seats in the Northern Mariana Islands House of Representatives were contested in the 2003 election.

District	Candidate	Votes	%
District 1: Saipan	David Mundo Apatang	1,913	10.70
District 1: Saipan	Timothy Pangelinan Villagomez	1,530	8.56
District 1: Saipan	Benjamin Benavente Seman	1,279	7.16
District 1: Saipan	Janet Ulloa Maratita	1,266	7.08
District 1: Saipan	Martin Borja Ada	1,140	6.38
District 1: Saipan	Joseph Pinaula Deleon Guerrero	1,010	5.65
District 1: Saipan	Manuel Agulto Tenorio	969	5.42
District 1: Saipan	Florencio Bobby Pan Tenorio Deleon Guerrero	953	5.33
District 1: Saipan	Pedro Pangelinan Castro	918	5.14
District 1: Saipan	Juan Cepeda Tudela	910	5.09
District 1: Saipan	James Duenas Cabrera	859	4.81
District 1: Saipan	Gerald Benavente Salas	778	4.35
District 1: Saipan	Herman Tudela Palacios	763	4.27
District 1: Saipan	Antonio Muna Camacho	732	4.10
District 1: Saipan	Jack Camacho Muna	623	3.49
District 1: Saipan	Francisco Deleon Guerrero Demapan	596	3.33
District 1: Saipan	Atanacio Ayuyu Taitingfong	552	3.09
District 1: Saipan	Pedro Cabrera Sablan	493	2.76
District 1: Saipan	Isidro Terlaje Ada	396	2.22
District 1: Saipan	Bernard Sablan Guerrero	195	1.09
District 2: Saipan	Oscar Manglona Babauta	502	35.73
District 2: Saipan	Jesus San Nicolas Lizama	458	32.60
District 2: Saipan	Vicente Aldan Ichihara	228	16.23
District 2: Saipan	Manasses Sablan Borja	217	15.44
District 3: Saipan & Northern Islands	Benigno Repeki Fitial	1,129	9.50
District 3: Saipan & Northern Islands	Heinz Sablan Hofschneider	1,100	9.25
District 3: Saipan & Northern Islands	Jesus Torres Attao	990	8.33
District 3: Saipan & Northern Islands	Arnold Indalecio Palacios	906	7.62
District 3: Saipan & Northern Islands	Ray Naraja Yumul	888	7.47
District 3: Saipan & Northern Islands	Ramon Angailen Tebuteb	788	6.63
District 3: Saipan & Northern Islands	William Sablan Torres	743	6.25
District 3: Saipan & Northern Islands	Stanley Estanislao Tudela Mcginnis Torres	730	6.14
District 3: Saipan & Northern Islands	Francisco Santos Dela Cruz	697	5.86
District 3: Saipan & Northern Islands	Melvin Lawrence Odoshi Faisao	686	5.77
District 3: Saipan & Northern Islands	Charles Palacios Reyes Jr.	601	5.06
District 3: Saipan & Northern Islands	Maximo Lairopi Olopai	521	4.38
District 3: Saipan & Northern Islands	Isidro Atalig Sablan	505	4.25
District 3: Saipan & Northern Islands	Luis Salas Camacho	367	3.09
District 3: Saipan & Northern Islands	Vicente Cabrera Camacho	353	2.97
District 3: Saipan & Northern Islands	Remedio Laniyo Seman	333	2.80
District 3: Saipan & Northern Islands	Antonio Aguon Santos	285	2.40
District 3: Saipan & Northern Islands	Christopher Bares Sablan	264	2.22
District 4: Saipan	Justo Songao Quitugua	901	28.29
District 4: Saipan	Claudio Kotomar Norita	805	25.27
District 4: Saipan	Gloria Annette Dela Cruz Cabrera	542	17.02
District 4: Saipan	Francisco Leon Guerrero Aldan	531	16.67
District 4: Saipan	Ignacio Villagomez Cabrera	406	12.75
District 5: Tinian	Norman Sablan Palacios	692	100
District 6: Rota	Crispin Manglona Ogo	541	43.95
District 6: Rota	Daniel Ogo Quitugua	476	38.67
District 6: Rota	Laura Inos Manglona	214	17.38

== Municipal Council ==
Municipal Council - 1st Senatorial District: Rota (non-partisan)
Party	Candidate	Votes	%
Nonpartisan	Mametto Maratita Ayuyu	926	28.57%
Nonpartisan	Tom Glenn A. Quitugua	703	21.69%
Nonpartisan	Alexander Apatang Apatang	649	20.02%
Nonpartisan	Rafaela Maratita Mesngon	519	16.01%
Nonpartisan	Jeffrey Lizama Manglona	444	13.70%
Total votes		3,241	100.00%

Municipal Council - 2nd Senatorial District: Tinian and Aguiguan (non-partisan)
Party	Candidate	Votes	%
Nonpartisan	Patrick Aquiningoc Manglona	705	33.75%
Nonpartisan	Edwin Palacios Aldan	692	33.13%
Nonpartisan	Jude Untalan Hofschneider	692	33.13%
Total votes		2,089	100.00%

Municipal Council - 3rd Senatorial District: Saipan & Northern Islands (non-partisan)
Party	Candidate	Votes	%
Nonpartisan	Gregorio Villagomez Deleon Guerrero	4,715	33.77%
Nonpartisan	Antonia Manibusan Tudela	4,643	33.25%
Nonpartisan	David Aldan Indalecio	4,604	32.98%
Total votes		14,962	100.00%

== Board of education ==
Board of Education - 1st Senatorial District: Rota (non-partisan)
Party	Candidate	Votes	%
Nonpartisan	Marja Lee Czechowicz Taitano	653	57.08%
Nonpartisan	Juanita Mundo Taisacan	491	42.92%
Total votes		1,144	100.00%

Board of Education - 3rd Senatorial District: Saipan & Northern Islands (non-partisan)
Party	Candidate	Votes	%
Nonpartisan	Roman Cepeda Benavente	4,726	40.94%
Nonpartisan	Egredino Mendiola Jones	3,556	30.80%
Nonpartisan	Juanita Seman Malone	3,263	28.26%
Total votes		11,545	100.00%

== Judges ==
Judge	For retention		Against retention		Total
Judge	Votes	%	Votes	%	Total
Juan Tudela Lizama	7,247	71.62	2,871	28.38	10,118
