= 1987 Northern Mariana Islands local government reorganisation referendum =

A referendum on a reorganisation of local government was held in the Northern Mariana Islands on 7 November 1987. The proposal was approved by voters.

== Background ==
The proposed reorganisation of local government was a legislative initiative passed by a 75% majority in both houses of the Legislature. As a result, only a simply majority of votes was required for the proposals to pass.

The proposals involved a complete rewrite of Chapter VI of the constitution, which defined the rights, duties and electoral system for local government.
