= 2005 Northern Mariana Islands general election =

- November 5, 2005
- Gubernatorial election
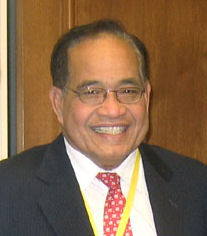

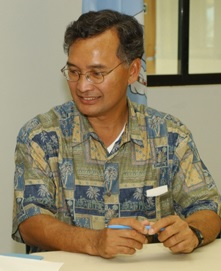

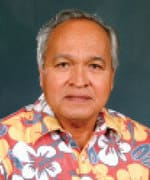
Candidate	Benigno Fitial	Heinz Hofschneider
Party	Covenant	Independent
Running mate	Timothy Villagomez	David M. Apatang
Popular vote	3,766	3,682
Percentage	27.95%	27.33%
Candidate	Juan Babauta	Froilan Tenorio
Party	Republican	Democratic
Running mate	Diego Benavente	Antonio Aguon Santos
Popular vote	3,584	2,440
Percentage	26.60%	18.11%
Governor before election
Juan Babauta
Republican
Elected Governor
Benigno Fitial
Covenant
- Senate election
- 6 of the 9 seats in the Senate; 5 seats needed for a majority
Party	Seats
Covenant	3
Republican	3
Democratic	2
Independents	1
This lists parties that won seats. See the complete results below.
- House election
- All 18 seats in the House of Representatives; 10 seats needed for a majority
Party	Seats
Covenant	7
Republican	7
Democratic	2
Independents	2
This lists parties that won seats. See the complete results below.
- Mayoral elections
- 3 Mayors
Party	Seats
Covenant	3
This lists parties that won seats. See the complete results below.

The 2005 Northern Mariana Islands general election was held on November 5, 2005. Voters in the Northern Mariana Islands voted for the Governor of the Northern Mariana Islands, the non-voting delegate to the United States House of Representatives, attorney general, 6 seats in the Northern Mariana Islands Senate, all eighteen seats in the Northern Mariana Islands House of Representatives, 3 mayors, seats for the municipal council, seats for the board of education, 2 justices, and a judges. There was also a referendum on calling a Constitutional Convention, which was approved by voters.

The gubernatorial election was the closest in the commonwealth's history, and resulted in the election of Benigno Fitial, narrowly defeating independent Heinz Hofschneider by 84 votes and incumbent Republican Governor Juan N. Babauta by an additional 98 votes. This would be the last year that the gubernatorial race would work in a first-past-the-post voting system as it would be reformed to work under a two-round system for the 2009 general elections. This election made commonwealth history by electing both the territory's first Carolinian governor and its first third party governor.

== Background ==
The referendum on the Constitutional Convention was called in order to comply with Chapter XVIII, article 2 of the constitution, which required a referendum to be held at least every ten years on convening such a convention. A referendum had been due in 2003 as the last referendum had been in 1993, but the legislature had failed to organise it.

15,118 people registered with the Election Commission to vote.

== Gubernatorial election ==
=== Candidates ===
Four candidates ran for governor, each with a running mate:

==== Covenant Party ====
- Benigno Repeki Fitial of the Covenant Party, sitting Speaker of the Northern Mariana Islands House of Representatives and 2001 gubernatorial candidate.
  - Timothy Pangelinan Villagomez, sitting Northern Mariana Islands Representative and Vice Speaker of the House at the time of the election.

==== Democratic Party ====
- Froilan Cruz "Lang" Tenorio, former Governor of the Northern Mariana Islands (1994–1998).
  - Antonio Aguon Santos, educator and teacher.

==== Independent ====
- Heinz Sablan Hofschneider, an independent, a sitting member of the Northern Mariana Islands House of Representatives and former Speaker until 2003. Hofschneider is a Republican, but ran as an independent in this election.
  - David Mundo Apatang, sitting Northern Mariana Islands Representative.

==== Republican Party ====
- Juan Babauta, incumbent Governor elected in 2001.
  - Diego Tenorio Benavente, incumbent Lieutenant Governor of the Northern Mariana Islands elected in 2001.

=== Results ===
Northern Mariana Islands Gubernatorial Election
Party	Candidate	Running mate	Results	
Party	Candidate	Running mate	Votes	%
Covenant	Benigno Repeki Fitial	Timothy Pangelinan Villagomez	3,766	27.95%
Independent	Heinz Sablan Hofschneider	David Mundo Apatang	3,682	27.33%
Republican	Juan Nekai Babauta (incumbent)	Diego Tenorio Benavente (incumbent)	3,584	26.60%
Democratic	Froilan Cruz "Lang" Tenorio	Antonio Aguon Santos	2,440	18.11%
Total			13,472	100%
Covenant gain from Republican				

== Resident Representative to U.S. Congress ==
This was the last election to have Resident Representative to U.S. Congress. In 2008, the Consolidated Natural Resources Act of 2008, signed into law by President George W. Bush, replaced the position of resident representative with a nonvoting delegate to the House of Representatives. The new position received the power to serve in congressional committees, to introduce bills, and to vote on proposed legislation in committee, but still had limited powers on the House floor, lacking the right to vote on legislation on the House floor.

CNMI Resident Representative to U.S. Congress
Party	Candidate	Votes	%
Republican	Pedro Agulto Tenorio	8,308	64.63%
Covenant	Juan Sablan Demapan	4,547	35.37%
Total votes		12,855	100.00%
Republican hold			

== Northern Mariana Islands Commonwealth Legislature ==
=== Results summary ===
Parties	House Election Results		Seat Change	Party Strength
Parties	2003	2005	+/−	Strength
Republican	7	7	Steady	38.89%
Covenant	9	7	2 ▼	38.89%
Independent	1	2	1 ▲	11.11%
Democratic	1	2	1 ▲	11.11%
Totals	18	18	Steady	100.00%

Parties	Senate Election Results		Seat Change	Party Strength
Parties	2003	2005	+/−	Strength
Covenant	3	3	Steady	33.33%
Republican	2	3	1 ▲	33.33%
Democratic	2	2	Steady	22.22%
Independent	2	1	1 ▼	11.11%
Totals	9	9	Steady	100.00%

=== Senate ===
The Northern Mariana Islands Senate is the upper house of the Northern Mariana Islands Commonwealth Legislature, consisting of nine senators representing three senatorial districts (Saipan & the Northern Islands, Tinian & Aguijan, and Rota), each a Multi-member district with three senators. Six seats in the Northern Mariana Islands Senate were up for the 2005 election.

Rota 1st Senatorial District (2 seats)
Party	Candidate	Votes	%
Covenant	Felix Taisacan Mendiola	634	23.62%
Republican	Paterno Songao Hocog	605	22.54%
Covenant	Jovita Maratita Taimanao	599	22.32%
Republican	Diego Maratita Songao	550	20.49%
Democratic	Eusebio Atalig Hocog	201	7.49%
Independent	Nobert Hocog Mendiola	95	3.54%
Total votes		2,684	100.00%

Tinian 2nd Senatorial District (2 seats)
Party	Candidate	Votes	%
Covenant	Joseph Masga Mendiola	583	26.77%
Republican	Jude Untalan Hofschneider	550	25.25%
Republican	Ramon Muna Dela Cruz	533	24.47%
Covenant	Joaquin Hoashi Borja	512	23.51%
Total votes		2,178	100.00%

Saipan & Northern Islands 3rd Senatorial District (2 seats)
Party	Candidate	Votes	%
Democratic	Maria Frica Tudela Pangelinan	4,894	24.43%
Independent	Pete Pangelinan Reyes	4,378	21.85%
Covenant	Claudio Kotomar Norita	4,270	21.31%
Republican	Thomas Pangelinan Villagomez	2,805	14.00%
Republican	Andrew Sablan Salas	2,717	13.56%
Democratic	Joaquin Terlaje Quitugua	970	4.84%
Total votes		20,034	100.00%

=== House of Representatives ===
The Northern Mariana Islands House of Representatives is the lower house of the Northern Mariana Islands Commonwealth Legislature. The house has six districts, several of which are Multi-member districts. All 18 seats in the Northern Mariana Islands House of Representatives were contested in the 2005 election. This was the last election to have 18 members.

House of Representative - District 1: Saipan (6 seats)
Party	Candidate	Votes	%
Republican	Joseph Pinaula Deleon Guerrero	2,357	8.63%
Republican	Benjamin Benavente Seman	2,233	8.17%
Republican	Manuel Agulto Tenorio	2,064	7.55%
Republican	Martin Borja Ada	2,209	8.08%
Democratic	Florencio Bobby Pan Tenorio Deleon Guerrero	1,979	7.24%
Covenant	Jacinta Matagolai Kaipat	1,891	6.92%
Republican	Edward Tudela Salas	1,840	6.74%
Republican	Janet Ulloa Maratita	1,787	6.54%
Democratic	Ramon Sablan Basa	1,663	6.08%
Democratic	Antonio Muna Camacho	1,564	5.72%
Covenant	Jesus Camacho Muna	1,334	4.88%
Covenant	Rose Nelly Taman Ada-Hocog	1,330	4.87%
Covenant	Juan Cepeda Deleon Guerrero	1,318	4.83%
Covenant	Herman Pangelinan Sablan	1,005	3.68%
Independent	Joseph Cepeda Reyes	966	3.54%
Independent	Pedro Cabrera Sablan	932	3.41%
Democratic	Nicolas Pangelinan Blas	850	3.11%
Total votes		27,322	100.00%

House of Representative - District 2: Saipan (2 seats)
Party	Candidate	Votes	%
Covenant	Oscar Manglona Babauta	600	41.50%
Covenant	Jesus San Nicolas Lizama	463	32.05%
Republican	Eric Benavente Atalig	382	26.45%
Total votes		1,445	100.00%

House of Representative - District 3: Saipan & Northern Islands (6 seats)
Party	Candidate	Votes	%
Republican	Arnold Indalecio Palacios	1,372	10.42%
Independent	Ray Naraja Yumul	1,184	8.99%
Republican	Ramon Angailen Tebuteb	1,154	8.77%
Covenant	Francisco Santos Dela Cruz	1,118	8.49%
Independent	Stanley Estanislao Tudela McGinnis Torres	1,013	7.70%
Covenant	Absalon Victor, Jr. Waki	999	7.59%
Covenant	Melvin Larence Odoshi Faisao	964	7.32%
Covenant	Henry Kaipat Rabauliman	941	7.14%
Covenant	Howard Iglecias Macaranas	917	6.96%
Republican	Francisco Iwashita Aquino	752	5.71%
Republican	David Castro Sablan	729	5.54%
Republican	Carmen Cruz Cabrera	710	5.39%
Democratic	Remedio Laniyo Seman	671	5.10%
Democratic	Jesus Sablan Barcinas	357	2.71%
Total votes		13,161	100.00%

House of Representative - District 4: Saipan (2 seats)
Party	Candidate	Votes	%
Democratic	Justo Songao Quitugua	1,409	40.90%
Republican	Candido Babauta Taman	836	24.27%
Covenant	Gonzalo Quitugua Santos	625	18.14%
Republican	Enrique Tamaoki Dela Cruz	574	16.69%
Total votes		3,444	100.00%

House of Representative - District 5: Tinian (1 seat)
Party	Candidate	Votes	%
Covenant	Edwin Palacios Aldan	555	52.21%
Republican	Norman Sablan Palacios	508	47.79%
Total votes		1,063	100.00%

House of Representative - District 6: Rota (1 seat)
Party	Candidate	Votes	%
Covenant	Crispin Mangloña Ogo	833	61.10%
Republican	Juan Mangloña Ayuyu	530	38.90%
Total votes		1,363	100.00%

== Mayors ==
Three mayoral posts were up for election across the Commonwealth. The elections resulted in the Covenant Party taking all the available positions.

Mayor - Saipan
Party	Candidate	Votes	%
Covenant	Juan Borja Tudela	3,786	35.75%
Independent	Frank Guerrero Cepeda	2,075	19.59%
Republican	James Aldan Ada	2,049	19.35%
Independent	Victorino Sablan Cepeda	1,558	14.71%
Democratic	Ricardo Reyes Duenas	1,123	10.60%
Total votes		10,591	100.00%

Mayor - Tinian and Aguiguan
Party	Candidate	Votes	%
Covenant	Jose Pangelinan San Nicolas	560	57.76%
Republican	Joaquin Gillimon Adriano	522	48.24%
Total votes		1,082	100.00%

Mayor - Rota
Party	Candidate	Votes	%
Covenant	Joseph Songao Inos	511	36.11%
Republican	Vicente Manglona Atalig	500	35.34%
Independent	Victor Borja Hocog	385	27.21%
Independent	Julian Taisacan Taimanao	19	1.34%
Total votes		1,415	100.00%

== Municipal Council ==
Municipal Council - Saipan & Northern Islands (non-partisan)
Party	Candidate	Votes	%
Nonpartisan	Marian Deleon Guerrero Tudela	4,416	17.95%
Nonpartisan	Antonia Manibusan Tudela	4,145	16.85%
Nonpartisan	Angel Songao Hocog	4,053	16.48%
Nonpartisan	Gregorio Villagomez Deleon Guerrero	3,669	14.92%
Nonpartisan	Francisco Pangelinan Rosario	3,507	14.26%
Nonpartisan	Francisco Cabrera Tudela	2,723	11.07%
Nonpartisan	Pedro Quitugua Deleon Guerrero	2,082	8.47%
Total votes		24,595	100.00%

Municipal Council - Tinian and Aguiguan (non-partisan)
Party	Candidate	Votes	%
Nonpartisan	Francisco Q. Cruz	571	17.50%
Nonpartisan	Charlene Manglona Lizama	564	17.28%
Nonpartisan	Trenton Brian Conner	546	16.73%
Nonpartisan	Eugenio Henry Lizama Villagomez	540	16.55%
Nonpartisan	Joseph Torres San Nicolas	532	16.30%
Nonpartisan	Concepcion Manglona	510	15.63%
Total votes		3,263	100.00%

Municipal Council - Rota (non-partisan)
Party	Candidate	Votes	%
Nonpartisan	Joey Anthony Quitugua	908	24.86%
Nonpartisan	Roy James Atalig Masga	775	21.22%
Nonpartisan	Mametto M. Ayuyu	582	15.93%
Nonpartisan	David Songao Atalig	568	15.55%
Nonpartisan	Manuel David Castro Atalig	556	15.22%
Nonpartisan	Tom Glenn A. Quitugua	264	7.23%
Total votes		3,653	100.00%

== Board of education ==
Board of Education - Saipan & Northern Islands (non-partisan)
Party	Candidate	Votes	%
Nonpartisan	Herman Tenorio Guerrero	6,488	65.17%
Nonpartisan	John Berneser Joyner	3,468	34.83%
Total votes		9,956	100.00%

Board of Education - Tinian and Aguiguan (non-partisan)
Party	Candidate	Votes	%
Nonpartisan	Lucia Linda Blanco-Maratita	585	54.83%
Nonpartisan	Don Allen Farrell	482	45.17%
Total votes		1,067	100.00%

== Justices ==
Both Supreme Court Justices won retention.

Justice	For retention		Against retention		Total
Justice	Votes	%	Votes	%	Total
Alexandro Cruz Castro✅	10,144	80.43%	2,468	19.57%	12,612
Miguel Sablan Demapan✅	8,704	68.77%	3,953	31.23%	12,657

== Judges ==
Judge	For retention		Against retention		Total
Judge	Votes	%	Votes	%	Total
David Arthur Wiseman✅	8,835	71.41%	3,538	28.59%	12,373

== Referendum ==
Constitutional Convention Question	Votes	%
For	7,394	58.92
Against	5,156	41.08
Invalid/blank votes		–
Total	12,550	100
Registered voters/turnout	15,118	
Source: Direct Democracy
