= Democratic Party of the Northern Mariana Islands =

Northern Mariana Islands affiliate of the Democratic Party

- Chairman: Jonathan Cabrera
- Vice Chairwoman: Luella Marciano
- Secretary: Melia Johnson
- Treasurer: Shawna Indalecio
- Founded: 1978
- Preceded by: Popular Party
- Headquarters: Saipan, Northern Mariana Islands
- Ideology: Modern liberalism
- Political position: Center-left
- National affiliation: Democratic Party
- Colors: Blue
- Northern Mariana Islands Governor: 0 / 1
- Northern Mariana Islands Lieutenant Governor: 0 / 1
- U.S. House of Representatives: 0 / 1
- Northern Mariana Islands Senate: 2 / 9
- Northern Mariana Islands House of Representatives: 2 / 20
- Northern Mariana Islands Mayors: 0 / 4

Election symbol

Website
- nmidems.org

The Democratic Party of the Northern Mariana Islands is a political party in the Northern Mariana Islands. It began as a purely local territorial party and is now officially affiliated with the United States' national Democratic Party.

== History ==
In 1977, the Popular Party changed its name to the Democratic Party. The Popular Party's opponent, the Territorial Party, would change its name to the Republican Party in 1981.

The CNMI has not elected a Democratic Governor since 1993, when Froilan Tenorio was elected. At the legislative elections of November 1, 2003 the party won one out of 18 seats. It won an extra seat in the 2005 legislative elections. Its candidate Froilan Tenorio won 18% in the 2005 gubernatorial election. In the November 3, 2007 Commonwealth Legislature elections, the party took only 1 of 20 seats in the House of Representatives.

In 2009, for the first time ever, the Democratic Party did not nominate a candidate in the gubernatorial election. They fielded a candidate for Mayor of Saipan (Angelo Villagomez), along with two CNMI House candidates and one CNMI Senate candidate.

In August 2016, the Commonwealth Election Commission recognized the party for the 2016 election year. Three of the 67 political candidates on the NMI are Democrats.

The party organized the 2020 Northern Mariana Islands Democratic caucuses.

In the 2020 elections, four incumbent representatives announced that they would run for re-election as Democrats. The party is running 18 candidates, and supporting three independent candidates. Prior to the election, there were zero Democrats in either chamber of the Commonwealth Legislature. The result of the 2020 general election was that the CNMI had experienced a blue wave as the party gained nine Democrats and the three endorsed independents were elected to office. For the first time in a decade, representatives affiliated with the Democratic Party had seats in the legislature. In the special election to replace the late Republican legislator Ivan A. Blanco, Democratic candidate Corina Magofna won the special election, flipping the seat.

In the 2022 gubernatorial election, the party nominated Tina Sablan for governor with Leila Staffler as her running mate. She lost the first race, conceded, and endorsed independent candidate Arnold Palacios and his running mate David M. Apatang. The party lost much of their gains from the previous election in the House, winning four seats, half of their previous win. They did gain a seat in the Senate, increasing their number to two.

== Positions ==
The Democratic Party of the Northern Mariana Islands has defended Article 12 of the CNMI Constitution which restricts land alienation to persons of Northern Marianas descent.

== Electoral history ==
=== Gubernatorial elections ===
| Election year | Candidate | Running mate | First round | | | Second round | | | Result |
| Election year | Candidate | Running mate | Votes | % | Rank | Votes | % | Rank | Result |
|---|---|---|---|---|---|---|---|---|---|
| 1977 | Carlos S. Camacho | Francisco Ada | TBD | TBD | ▲1st | —N/a | | | Won |
| 1981 | TBD | TBD | TBD | TBD | TBD | —N/a | | | Lost |
| 1986 | TBD | TBD | TBD | TBD | TBD | —N/a | | | Lost |
| 1989 | TBD | TBD | TBD | TBD | TBD | —N/a | | | Lost |
| 1993 | Froilan Tenorio | Jesus Borja | TBD | TBD | ▲1st | —N/a | | | Won |
| 1997 | Froilan Tenorio | TBA | TBD | 27.4 | ▼2nd | —N/a | | | Lost |
| 2001 | Jesus Borja | Bridget Ichihara | 2,117 | 18.20 | ▼3rd | —N/a | | | Lost |
| 2005 | Froilan Cruz "Lang" Tenorio | Antonio Aguon Santos | 2,440 | 18.11 | ▼4th | —N/a | | | Lost |
| 2009 | Did not contest | | | | | | | | |
| 2012 | Edward Guerrero | Danny Quitugua | 541 | 3.92 | 4th | —N/a | | | Lost |
| 2018 | Joseph S. Inos (withdrew) | Did not contest | | | | | | | |
| 2022 | Tina Sablan | Leila Haveia Fleming Clark Staffler | 4,132 | 28.01 | ▲3rd | —N/a | | | Lost |

=== Delegate elections ===
| Election year | Candidate | Votes | % | Rank | Result |
|---|---|---|---|---|---|
| 2008 | David Mendiola Cing | 307 | 3.02 | ▲6th | Lost |
| 2010 | Jesus Borja | 1,707 | 15.07 | ▲4th | Lost |
| 2012 | Did not contest | | | | |
| 2014 | Andrew Sablan Salas | 4,547 | 34.72 | ▲2nd | Lost |
| 2016 | Did not contest | | | | |
| 2018 | Did not contest | | | | |
| 2020 | Did not contest | | | | |
| 2022 | Gregorio Sablan | 12,315 | 100.00 | ▲1st | Won |
| 2024 | Ed Propst | 4,067 | 33.27 | ▼2nd | Lost |

=== Senate elections ===
| Election | Seats | | +/– | Status |
| Election | Up for election | Total | +/– | Status |
|---|---|---|---|---|
| 1999 | 1 / 3 | 2 / 9 | ▲1 | Minority |
| 2001 | 0 / 6 | 1 / 9 | ▼1 | Minority |
| 2003 | 1 / 3 | 2 / 9 | ▲1 | Minority |
| 2005 | 1 / 6 | 2 / 9 | 0 | Minority |
| 2007 | 0 / 3 | 1 / 9 | ▼1 | Minority |
| 2009 | 0 / 6 | 0 / 9 | ▼1 | Not represented |
| 2012 | Did not contest | | | Not represented |
| 2014 | 0 / 6 | 0 / 9 | 0 | Not represented |
| 2016 | 0 / 3 | 0 / 9 | 0 | Not represented |
| 2018 | Did not contest | | | Not represented |
| 2020 | 1 / 3 | 1 / 9 | ▲1 | Minority |
| 2022 | 1 / 6 | 2 / 9 | ▲1 | Minority |
| 2024 | 1 / 3 | 2 / 9 | 0 | Minority |

=== House of Representatives elections ===
| Election year | Seats | +/– | Status |
|---|---|---|---|
| 1997 | 5 / 18 | TBD | Minority |
| 1999 | 6 / 18 | ▲1 | Minority |
| 2001 | 1 / 18 | ▼5 | Minority |
| 2003 | 1 / 18 | 0 | Minority |
| 2005 | 2 / 18 | ▲1 | Minority |
| 2007 | 1 / 20 | ▼1 | Minority |
| 2009 | 0 / 20 | ▼1 | Not represented |
| 2012 | Did not contest | 0 | Not represented |
| 2014 | 0 / 20 | 0 | Not represented |
| 2016 | 0 / 20 | 0 | Not represented |
| 2018 | 0 / 20 | 0 | Not represented |
| 2020 | 8 / 20 | ▲8 | Majority coalition |
| 2022 | 4 / 20 | ▼4 | Majority coalition |
| 2024 | 2 / 20 | ▼2 | Majority coalition |
