= Luis John Castro =

Northern Mariana Islands politician

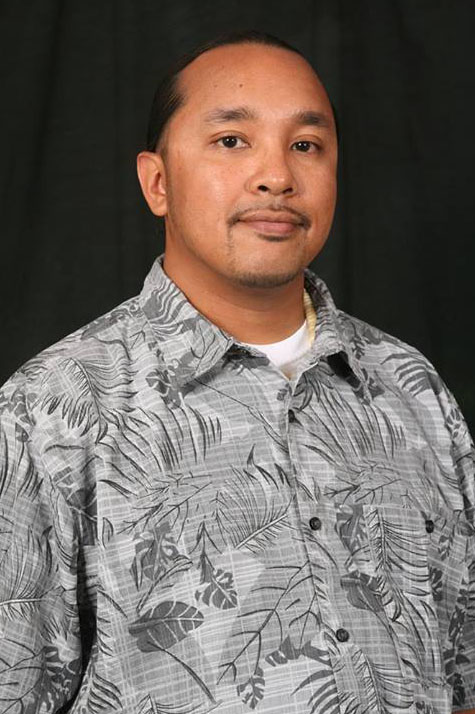
- Official Portrait of Representative Luis John DLG. Castro

Member of the Northern Mariana Islands House of Representatives from the 1st District
- In office January 14, 2019 – January 11, 2021

Member of the Saipan & Northern Islands Municipal Council
- In office January 9, 2017 – January 14, 2019

Chairman of the Saipan & Northern Islands Municipal Council
- In office January 9, 2017 – January 14, 2019
- Preceded by: Antonia M. Tudela
- Succeeded by: Debra T. Camacho

Member of the CNMI Youth Congress
- In office October, 1999 – October, 2002

Speaker of the CNMI Youth Congress
- In office October, 2001 – October 2002
- Preceded by: Angel Demapan
- Succeeded by: Alvin "Champ" Fejeran Jr.

Personal details
- Born: Luis John Deleon Guerrero Castro; October 27, 1982 (age 43) Fina Sisu, Saipan, Northern Mariana Islands, U.S.
- Party: Republican
- Spouse: Elaine Cabrera
- Children: 5
- Education: Northern Marianas College

Luis John Deleon Guerrero Castro (born October 27, 1982) is a Chamorro-American politician and a former member of the 21st Northern Mariana Islands House of Representatives. A former member of youth government in the early 2000s, he entered the civic arena by winning a seat in the local municipal government.

He was elected to the Northern Mariana Islands House of Representatives in the 2018 Northern Mariana Islands general election.

== Early life and career ==
Castro was born on October 27, 1982, in the village of Fina Sisu, Saipan to Luis Tenorio Castro (1951 - 1999) and Margarita Quitugua Deleon Guerrero (1951 - 2015).

He graduated from Marianas High School in 2001 and attended Northern Marianas College where he majored in Business Management and Liberal Arts.

He previously worked as a teacher's assistant in the CNMI Public School System and as an Administrative Assistant at the Northern Marianas College.

== Political career ==
=== CNMI Youth Congress ===
Castro was elected to the CNMI Youth Congress where he served three terms, ending his tenure holding the title of Speaker. Prior to becoming Speaker, he also served as Chairman of the Committee on Public Utilities, Transportation & Communication, and as Vice-Speaker. In his time as a youth senator, he was an ardent supporter of the Project KidCare program, which promoted using photo identification to aid in the prevention of child abductions in America. He also was instrumental in supporting the creation of the Office of Youth Affairs, a cabinet level agency aimed at overseeing youth programs in the islands.

=== Office of the Governor ===
In 2014, he worked for Governor Eloy Inos as a Public Information Specialist under then-Press Secretary Angel Demapan. He continued in this capacity under the administration of Governor Ralph Torres until his election to the Legislature in 2018.

=== Councilman ===
In 2016, he ran for public office anew as a candidate for the Saipan & Northern Islands Municipal Council, a form of municipal level government in the Northern Mariana Islands. He won election and was sworn in on January 9, 2017, becoming the youngest person to serve in that capacity in the council's history. After taking office, he was elected chairman of the council, the equivalency of a vice mayor position.

While in office, he championed destination enhancement within the villages, proper treatment of ancestral remains and increased awareness of medicinal plants. He is also an active member of the Association of Mariana Island Mayors, Vice-Mayors and Elected Municipal Council Members, and has made strides in promoting inter-island collaborations between village leaders in all four of the Marianas's jurisdictions.

By law in the CNMI, Castro in his capacity as Chairman served as Acting Mayor in the event of the absence, vacancy, or death of either the Mayor of Saipan or the Northern Islands. This was the case in February 2017 when Northern Islands Mayor Francisco Jerome Kaipat Aldan died suddenly while in office. Castro served as mayor in the interim until the appointment of Vicente Cruz Santos Jr. to fill out the remainder of Aldan's term.

=== House of Representatives ===
In April 2018, Castro announced his intention to seek a seat in the House of Representatives for Election District 1, the CNMI's largest election precinct encompassing nearly the entire eastern and southern portions of Saipan in the upcoming general elections

Originally scheduled for November 6, the elections were postponed for two weeks following the devastation brought upon by Typhoon Yutu. On November 14, 2018, Castro was elected to a two-year term in the House of Representatives, finishing fifth out of thirteen candidates.

He was sworn into office on January 14, 2019. After assuming his duties, he was appointed to serve as chairman on the House Committee on Federal & Foreign Affairs. Aside from his chairmanship, he is also a member of the House Committees on Ways & Means, Commerce & Tourism, Natural Resources, and Public Utilities, Transportation & Communication.

As part of the legislature's efforts to address issues regarding previous federal assistance for previous natural disasters and assistance relating to the COVID-19 pandemic in the Northern Marianas, Castro was appointed to serve on the House Special Committee on Federal Assistance and Disaster Related Funding. He served also served on the House Special Committee on Fiscal Review of Executive Expenditures, tasked with investigating use of funds by the Executive Branch.

=== Bills Signed Into Law ===
His first bill, HB 21-23 HD1, aimed at including the CNMI in the Emergency Management Assistance Compact. This measure allowed the Commonwealth to be included in the agreement which includes all fifty states, Puerto Rico, U.S. Virgin Islands, and Guam, enabling states and territories to share resources during natural and man-made disasters, including terrorism. Governor Ralph Torres signed the bill into law on September 3, 2019, officially becoming Public Law 21–7.

Castro's second bill signed into law was HB 21-60 entitled the "CNMI Cultural Masters Act of 2019", which aimed at creating an honors program to recognize artists in the Northern Marianas who left an indelible impact on the cultural arts spectrum in the Commonwealth. Passed by the House and passing the Senate with some amendments, it became Public Law 21-21 on April 3, 2020.

=== Re-Election Bid ===
In August 2020, Castro announced his intent to seek re-election as an independent candidate for his precinct. In the November general elections, Castro finished 11th out of 14 candidates, losing his bid for a second term. In a statement published on social media, the outgoing representative said, "Though my term will come to a close in January, I stay committed to working with you and for you while still in office to address our Commonwealth’s issues and offer solutions to them. From the bottom of my heart, thank you for the opportunity to serve these last two years."

== Personal life ==
He and his partner Elaine Cabrera raise five children. A devout Roman Catholic, he played a role in forming the Diocesan Youth Commission for the Roman Catholic Diocese of Chalan Kanoa.

Since 2002, he has been a strong advocate of cultural enrichment through performing arts. In 2004, he was a performing arts delegate for the Northern Marianas in the IX Festival of Pacific Arts which was held that year in Palau. He currently serves as creative director of Guma' Simiyan Manaina-ta, a local dance troupe aimed at showcasing Chamorro culture through performing arts.

In 2017, CNMI Governor Ralph Torres conferred on him the Governor's Humanities Award for Preservation of Traditional Cultural Practices, in recognition of his work in promoting culture through song, chant, and dance.
