= James Ada =

American politician

Chair of the Northern Mariana Islands Republican Party
- Incumbent
- Assumed office August 1, 2026
- Preceded by: Patrick Cepeda
- In office February 19, 2014 – November 2021
- Preceded by: Jack Villagomez
- Succeeded by: Candace Celis

Personal details
- Party: Republican

James Ada is an American politician who is Secretary of the Department of Public Works of the Commonwealth of the Northern Mariana Islands (CNMI) and president of CNMI Republican Party.

== CNMI Little League ==
James Ada has a 40-year long career as an official of the CNMI Little League International baseball and softball nonprofit organization. In 1992, Ada became vice president of the Little League and one year later became a player agent. Between 1999 and 2001 he was director of the Far East Regional Tournament and a board member of the 2002 Asia-Pacific Championship held in Guam where he was then chosen as advisor of the event in 2003. Also in Guam, he was elected into the Little League Baseball International Board of Directors in 2004. In the following year and again in 2008 he was an advisor for the Asia-Pacific Championship. In 2010, Ada attended the Little League Baseball Congress in Ottawa, Canada. After 17 years in office, Ada stepped down as district administrator for CNMI's Little League in 2012. He was succeeded by Mike Borja who was elected by the Presidents and Representatives of the three islands' league on 14 June 2012.

In 2013, together with Piding Tenorio he coordinated the Little League major division's district tournament games, filling in for Mike Borja who had to undergone medical treatment. In 2015, Ada, elected Asia-Pacific Championship director, had to announce that the tournament had to be called of the games due to typhoon Chan-Hom. Ada was district administrator of the Little League of CNMI for the 2016 season. The decision was made by the Little League International, which had to break a tie in the election committee.

== CNMI GOP President ==
On 19 February 2014, the CNMI Republican Party announced that its board of directors had unanimously appointed Ada as president. In January 2015, Ada together with Bo Palacios attended a national GOP conference in San Diego, California.

Ada was informed in April 2015 by the then-RNC chairman Reince Priebus that he would be a member of Committee on Arrangements for the 2016 Republican National Convention in Cleveland, Ohio, together with Amata Coleman Radewagen, who was the Delegate for the United States House of Representatives from American Samoa. In May 2015, the members of the Committee from mainland U.S. had a preparatory meeting, chaired by Steve King, in Phoenix, Arizona for a preparatory discussion, while James Ada took part via Skype.

== CNMI Department of Public Works ==
James Ada had worked for the CNMI Department of Public Works for ten years, when he became the department's new secretary in April 2015. Colleagues at DPW testified before CNMI Senate. Ada was unanimously confirmed by the CNMI Senate.

In 2016, Ada declared that groundbreakings for three major routes would take place soon, of which DPW is the contracting agency.

In February 2017, Governor Torres called together all members of his cabinet for so-called courtesy resignations, which allowed him to restructure parts of his administrative team. Ada later was confirmed as secretary by Governor Torres.

Party political offices
Preceded by Jack Villagomez	Chair of the Northern Mariana Islands Republican Party; 2014–2021	Succeeded by Candace Celis
Preceded by Patrick Cepeda	Chair of the Northern Mariana Islands Republican Party; 2026–present	Incumbent
