= Luella Marciano =

Northern Mariana Islander politician and educator

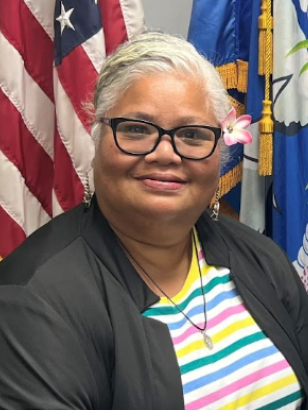

Chair of the Northern Mariana Islands Democratic Party
- Acting
- In office April 12, 2024 – May 3, 2025
- Preceded by: Jonathan Cabrera
- Succeeded by: Annie Pickelsimer

Personal details
- Party: Democratic
- Education: Northern Marianas College (AA); University of Guam (BA); University of Maine, Farmington (MEd)

Luella Ichihara Marciano is a Northern Mariana Islander politician and educator serving as the resident executive of the Northern Mariana Islands (NMI) Indigenous Affairs Office since 2024. She has served as the interim vice chair of the NMI Democratic Party since 2022.

== Life ==
Marciano is Refaluwasch. She earned an A.A. in education from Northern Marianas College. She completed a B.A. in education at the University of Guam. Marciano received a M.Ed. from Farmington State College. Marciano is a retired teacher from the Commonwealth of the Northern Mariana Islands Public School System (PSS).

In 2020, as a member of the Democratic Party of the Northern Mariana Islands, Marciano ran for the precinct 2 seat in the NMI House of Representatives. She lost in the general election. Marciano is a member of the Refaluwasch for Good Governance and Friends of San Isidro. In 2020, she became the secretary of the NMI Democratic Party. Marciano became its interim vice chair in 2022. By 2024, she was the vice chair. In February 2024, Marciano was appointed by governor Arnold Palacios as the acting resident executive of the NMI Indigenous Affairs Office. Her appointment was confirmed by the senate in April 2024. She succeeded Ross Manglona who died in November 2023.

Party political offices
Preceded by Jonathan Cabrera	Chair of the Northern Mariana Islands Democratic Party; Acting; 2024–2025	Succeeded by Annie Pickelsimer
