= Covenant Party (Northern Mariana Islands) =

2001–2013 political party in the Northern Mariana Islands

- Founder: Benigno Fitial
- Founded: 2001
- Dissolved: 2013
- Split from: Republican Party
- Merged into: Republican Party
- Ideology: Populism
- Political position: Big tent
- Colors: Green; White

The Covenant Party was a political party in the Commonwealth of the Northern Mariana Islands (CNMI). The party was founded in 2001, splitting from the Republican Party. It was dissolved in 2013, with the party merging back into the Republican Party. The party advocated for governmental and financial reform.

== History ==
=== 2001–2008 ===
The party was named after the Covenant to Establish a Commonwealth of the Northern Mariana Islands in Political Union with the United States of America, Act of Mar. 24, 1976, Pub. L. 94-241, 90 Stat. 263, codified as amended at 48 U.S.C. § 1801 note.

In the 2003 general election, the Covenant Party won nine of eighteen seats. The party mostly made up of members from the Republican Party, but many prominent Democrats would also join the party.

In the 2005 general elections, the Covenant Party increased its position as one of the strongest parties in the Commonwealth when Benigno R. Fitial, the party's gubernatorial candidate, won the election. The Covenant Party won seven of 18 seats in the commonwealth's House of Representatives and three of nine seats in its Senate.

In the 2007 general election, the Covenant Party won only four of 20 seats in the House of Representatives. The party maintained three seats in senate.

=== Scandal ===
In August 2008, Villagomez was indicted on felony charges relating to the misuse of government funds. On April 24, 2009, he was found guilty along with former Commerce Secretary James A. Santos and his wife Joaquina V. Santos (Villagomez's sister) relating to a scheme to defraud the Commonwealth Utilities Corp. through needless purchases of a de-scaling chemical called Rydlyme. Awaiting sentencing on July 28, 2009, Villagomez tendered his resignation on April 24.

=== 2009–2013 ===
In December 2010, Governor Benigno Fitial proposed that the Covenant Party merge with the Republican Party. Republican and Covenant Party leaders rejected the proposal, and the Covenant Party contested the 2012 general elections. Governor Benigno Fitial would leave the Covenant Party and rejoin the Republican Party, passing leadership to Eloy Inos. In 2012, the Covenant Party endorsed then-independent Congressman Gregorio Kilili Camacho Sablan whom Benigno Fitial wanted replaced with a Republican in the 2012 elections.

In September 2013, Governor Eloy Inos again tried to merge the Covenant Party with the Republican Party. The party is considered dissolved when Inos departed the party and rejoined the Republican Party in 2013. Many left the party soon after. Most moved to the Republican Party, which made it a Republican Party absorption of the Covenant Party. On August 19, 2021, during an interview on the 2022 gubernatorial election, Lt. Gov. Arnold I. Palacios mentioned that the Republican Party did vote to approve the merger in 2013.

== Electoral history ==
=== CNMI Gubernatorial elections ===
Year	Nominees		First Round				Second Round				Result
Year	Governor	Lieutenant Governor	Votes	Percentage	Placement	±%	Votes	Percentage	Placement	±%	Result
2001	Benigno Repeki Fitial	Rita Hocog Inos	2,963	25.45%	2nd	N/A	Run-off voting was not implemented yet				Lost
2005	Benigno Repeki Fitial	Timothy Pangelinan Villagomez	3,766	27.95%	1st	N/A	Run-off voting was not implemented yet				Won
2009	Benigno Repeki Fitial	Eulogio "Eloy" Songao Inos	4,892	36.14%	2nd	▲8.19	6,610	51.44%	1st	N/A	Won

=== CNMI Delegate election ===
Year	Candidate	Votes	Percentage	Placement	Result
2010	Joseph James Norita Camacho	2,744	24.23%	2nd	Lost

=== CNMI Territorial Senate elections ===
Year	District	Candidate	Votes	Percentage	Placement	Result
2005	Rota 1st Senatorial District (2 seats)	Felix Taisacan Mendiola	634	23.62%	1st	Won
2005	Rota 1st Senatorial District (2 seats)	Paterno Songao Hocog	599	22.32%	3rd	Lost
2005	Tinian 2nd Senatorial District (2 seats)	Joseph Masga Mendiola	583	26.77%	1st	Won
2005	Tinian 2nd Senatorial District (2 seats)	Joaquin Hoashi Borja	512	23.51%	4th	Lost
2005	Saipan & Northern Islands 3rd Senatorial District (2 seats)	Claudio Kotomar Norita	4,270	21.31%	3rd	Lost
2007	Rota 1st Senatorial District (1 seat)	Crispin Manglona Ogo	491	37.68%	2nd	Lost
2007	Tinian 2nd Senatorial District (1 seat)	Henry Hofschneider San Nicolas	599	55.93%	1st	Won
2007	Saipan & Northern Islands 3rd Senatorial District (1 seat)	Ramon Santos Dela Cruz	1,384	15.53%	4th	Lost
2009	Tinian 2nd Senatorial District (2 seats)	Joaquin Hoashi Borja	564	23.04%	3rd	Lost
2009	Tinian 2nd Senatorial District (2 seats)	Joseph Masga Mendiola (incumbent)	549	22.43%	4th	Lost
2009	Saipan & Northern Islands 3rd Senatorial District (2 seats)	Jacinta Matagolai Kaipat	2,947	14.90%	3rd	Lost
2009	Saipan & Northern Islands 3rd Senatorial District (2 seats)	Ana Sablan Teregeyo	1,768	8.94%	6th	Lost
2012	Saipan & Northern Islands 3rd Senatorial District (1 seat)	Ana Sablan Teregeyo	1,225	13.06%	4th	Lost

=== CNMI Territorial House of Representatives elections ===
Year	District	Candidate	Votes	Percentage	Placement	Result
2005	District 1: Saipan (6 seats)	Jacinta Matagolai Kaipat	1,891	6.92%	6th	Won
2005	District 1: Saipan (6 seats)	Jesus Camacho Muna	1,334	4.88%	11th	Lost
2005	District 1: Saipan (6 seats)	Rose Nelly Taman Ada-Hocog	1,330	4.87%	12th	Lost
2005	District 1: Saipan (6 seats)	Juan Cepeda Deleon Guerrero	1,318	4.83%	13th	Lost
2005	District 1: Saipan (6 seats)	Herman Pangelinan Sablan	1,005	3.68%	14th	Lost
2005	District 2: Saipan (2 seats)	Oscar Manglona Babauta	600	41.50%	1st	Won
2005	District 2: Saipan (2 seats)	Jesus San Nicolas Lizama	463	32.05%	2nd	Won
2005	District 3: Saipan & Northern Islands (6 seats)	Francisco Santos Dela Cruz	1,118	8.49%	4th	Won
2005	District 3: Saipan & Northern Islands (6 seats)	Absalon Victor, Jr. Waki	999	7.59%	6th	Won
2005	District 3: Saipan & Northern Islands (6 seats)	Melvin Larence Odoshi Faisao	964	7.32%	7th	Lost
2005	District 3: Saipan & Northern Islands (6 seats)	Henry Kaipat Rabauliman	941	7.14%	8th	Lost
2005	District 3: Saipan & Northern Islands (6 seats)	Howard Iglecias Macaranas	917	6.96%	9th	Lost
2005	District 4: Saipan (2 seats)	Gonzalo Quitugua Santos	625	18.14%	3rd	Lost
2005	District 5: Tinian (1 seat)	Edwin Palacios Aldan	555	52.21%	1st	Won
2005	District 6: Rota (1 seat)	Crispin Mangloña Ogo	833	61.10%	1st	Won
2007	District 1: Saipan (6 seats)	Rose Nelly Taman Ada-Hocog	678	4.47%	10th	Lost
2007	District 2: Saipan (2 seats)	Oscar Manglona Babauta	383	23.97%	1st	Won
2007	District 2: Saipan (2 seats)	Raymond Demapan Palacios	381	6.92%	2nd	Won
2007	District 3: Saipan (6 seats)	Francisco "Frank" Santos Dela Cruz	1,109	10.48%	6th	Won
2007	District 3: Saipan (6 seats)	David Reyes Maratita	915	8.65%	8th	Lost
2007	District 5: Saipan (2 seats)	Ramon Sablan Basa	241	8.50%	5th	Lost
2007	District 5: Saipan (2 seats)	Jesus Camacho Muna	186	6.56%	8th	Lost
2007	District 6: Tinian (1 seats)	Edwin Palacios Aldan	547	51.65%	1st	Won
2009	District 1: Saipan (6 seats)	Froilan Cruz "Lang" Tenorio	1,671	9.83%	2nd	Won
2009	District 1: Saipan (6 seats)	Vicente Camacho Cabrera	993	5.84%	10th	Lost
2009	District 1: Saipan (6 seats)	Benjamin Matagolai Cepeda	918	5.40%	11th	Lost
2009	District 1: Saipan (6 seats)	Antonia Manibusan Tudela	852	5.01%	12th	Lost
2009	District 1: Saipan (6 seats)	Canice Kaipat Taitano	764	4.49%	13th	Lost
2009	District 2: Saipan (2 seats)	Raymond Demapan Palacios (incumbent)	494	27.07%	1st	Won
2009	District 2: Saipan (2 seats)	Rafael Sablan Demapan	381	20.88%	2nd	Won
2009	District 3: Saipan (6 seats)	Felicidad Taman Ogumoro	1,140	8.48%	4th	Won
2009	District 3: Saipan (6 seats)	Edmund Joseph Sablan Villagomez	1,079	8.03%	5th	Won
2009	District 3: Saipan (6 seats)	Jesus Mareham Elameto	957	7.12%	7th	Lost
2009	District 3: Saipan (6 seats)	David Reyes Maratita	901	6.70%	8th	Lost
2009	District 3: Saipan (6 seats)	Henry Kaipat Rabauliman	864	6.43%	10th	Lost
2009	District 4: Saipan (2 seats)	Sylvestre Ilo Iguel	618	23.69%	2nd	Won
2009	District 4: Saipan (2 seats)	Thomas Jesus Camacho	480	18.40%	4th	Lost
2009	District 5: Saipan (2 seats)	Ramon Sablan Basa	664	18.83%	2nd	Won
2009	District 5: Saipan (2 seats)	Daniel Ogo Quitugua	409	11.60%	6th	Lost
2009	District 6: Tinian (1 seat)	Edwin Palacios Aldan (incumbent)	550	45.80%	2nd	Lost
2012	District 1: Saipan (6 seats)	Martin Cabrera Sablan	1,060	6.64%	7th	Lost
2012	District 2: Saipan (2 seats)	John Paul Palacios Sablan	547	28.40%	1st	Won
2012	District 2: Saipan (2 seats)	Rafael Sablan Demapan (incumbent)	521	27.05%	2nd	Won
2012	District 2: Saipan (2 seats)	Edmund Joseph Sablan Villagomez (incumbent)	963	7.61%	4th	Won
2012	District 2: Saipan (2 seats)	Brian Ayuyu Torres	362	2.86%	16th	Lost
2012	District 4: Saipan (2 seats)	Christopher Duenas Leon Guerrero	639	30.47%	1st	Won

=== CNMI Mayoral elections ===
Year	District	Candidate	Votes	Percentage	Placement	Result
2005	Mayor - Saipan	Juan Borja Tudela	3,786	35.75%	1st	Won
2005	Mayor - Tinian and Aguiguan	Jose Pangelinan Borja San Nicolas	560	57.76%	1st	Won
2005	Mayor - Rota	Joseph Songao Inos	511	36.11%	1st	Won
2009	Mayor - Tinian & Aquiguan	Jose Pangelinan Borja San Nicolas (incumbent)	565	44.81%	2nd	Lost
2009	Mayor - Northern Islands	Ramona Taisakan Rebuenog	68	49.64%	2nd	Lost
