= Larry DeLeon Guerrero Jr. =

Politician from the Northern Mariana Islands

Lorenzo Iglecias "Larry" DeLeon Guerrero Jr. is a politician from the Northern Mariana Islands who has served as a member of the Northern Mariana Islands House of Representatives. A Republican, he represented the 5th district from 2013 to 2021 and served as Vice Speaker during the 21st Commonwealth Legislature. He lost reelection in 2020.

== Early life and education ==
He is the son of former Governor Lorenzo I. De Leon Guerrero. He graduated from Marianas High School and received an associate degree from Pierce Community College in Washington State. He served in the United States Army.
