= Ivan Blanco (politician) =

Northern Mariana Islander politician (1976–2021)

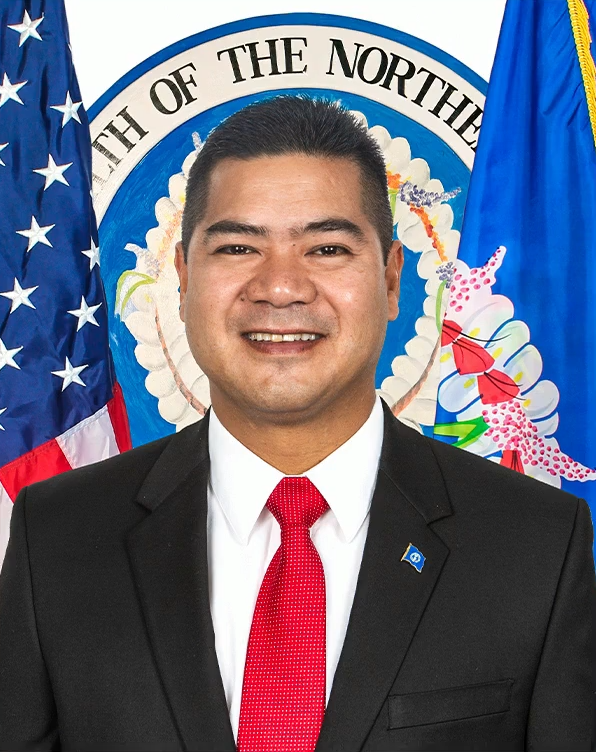

Minority Leader of the Northern Mariana Islands House of Representatives
- In office January 13, 2021 – July 23, 2021
- Preceded by: Ed Propst
- Succeeded by: Angel Demapan

Personal details
- Born: Ivan James Alafanso Blanco; November 29, 1976 Saipan, Northern Mariana Islands
- Died: July 23, 2021 (aged 44) Saipan, Northern Mariana Islands
- Party: Republican
- Spouse: Carmen Sablan Blanco
- Education: Creighton University

Ivan James Alafanso Blanco (November 29, 1976 – July 23, 2021) was a Northern Mariana Islander politician who served as a Republican member of the Northern Mariana Islands House of Representatives from January 2017 to July 2021.

== Early life and career ==
Ivan James Alfonso Blanco was born November 29, 1976.

He attended Xavier High School and then earned a bachelor's degree from Creighton University.

In 2007, took a position with the Office of the Public Auditor in the Federated States of Micronesia. He returned to Saipan in 2010 and took a number of government positions including director of the Central Statistics Division of the CNMI Department of Commerce, deputy secretary of Commerce, grants manager for the Office of Grants Management, and special assistant for Communications and Protocol for the Office of the Governor.

== Political career ==
He was first elected to the Northern Mariana Islands House of Representatives in the 2016 general election. He was the top vote-getter among the twelve candidates running for six seats in Precinct #3. He was reelected in 2018 and 2020. On January 13, 2021, after the speaker election, the Republican caucus elected Blanco as minority leader. Later that month, he was elected vice chair of the 22nd Saipan and Northern Islands Legislative Delegation.

Around the time of his death, he was planning to run for the Northern Mariana Islands Senate in the 2022 general election. In the special election to fill the vacancy caused by his passing, Democratic candidate Corina Magofna defeated Republican candidate Grace Sablan-Vaiagae. His fellow Republicans chose Angel Demapan to succeed him as minority leader.

== Death and legacy ==
Blanco died on July 23, 2021. In 2023, the Ma'afala Breadfruit Program, a program created by a task force that Blanco led while at the Office of Grants Management, was renamed the Ivan A. Blanco Breadfruit Program.
