= Republican Party (Northern Mariana Islands) =

Northern Mariana Islands affiliate of the Republican Party

CNMI Republican Party
- Chairperson: James Ada
- 1st Vice-Chair: Mathilda "Keko" A. Rosario
- 2nd Vice-Chair: Jesus Torres Aldan
- Secretary: William "Bill" Villagomez
- Treasurer: Edward C. Deleon Guerrero
- Preceded by: Territorial Party
- Ideology: Conservatism
- National affiliation: Republican Party
- Colors: Red
- Northern Mariana Islands Governor: 0 / 1
- Northern Mariana Islands Lieutenant Governor: 1 / 1
- U.S. House of Representatives: 1 / 1
- Northern Mariana Islands Senate: 4 / 9
- Northern Mariana Islands House of Representatives: 2 / 20
- Northern Mariana Islands Mayors: 3 / 4

The CNMI Republican Party is a political party in the Northern Mariana Islands. The Northern Mariana Islands Republican Party is now associated with the United States Republican Party though no Northern Mariana Islands politicians have achieved high-ranking positions in the mainland United States.

== History ==
In 2000, leaders of the Republican Party of Guam and the Republican Party of American Samoa began a campaign for the Republican National Committee to recognize the CNMI Republican Party as an affiliate and give it representation on the committee. At the 2004 Republican National Convention, a motion was passed to grant such recognition. The CNMI Republican Party sent its first delegation in 2008.

In the 2001 gubernatorial election Juan Babauta of the Republican Party won with 42.8% of the vote. At the legislative elections of November 1, 2003 the party won seven out of 18 seats in the House of Representatives.

In 2001, the conservative Covenant Party would split and form from Republican Party, becoming the main competitor for the Republicans in the CNMI up until the Covenant Party's dissolution and merger in 2013.

In 2003, the Covenant Party managed to gain half of the seats in the CNMI House of Representatives and one-third of the senate, both of which resulted in a plurality victory over both the Republicans and the Democrats.

In 2004, the CNMI Republican party gained recognition on the island of Tinian.

In the 2005 Northern Mariana Islands general election, incumbent Governor Juan Babauta was defeated, receiving 26% of the vote and placing third, behind Covenant Party Candidate Benigno Fitial, who placed first, and independent candidate Heinz Hofschneider. The Republicans won seven of 18 seats in the House of Representatives and three of nine seats in the Senate.

In the 2007 Northern Mariana Islands general election, the party took 12 of 20 seats in the House of Representatives, giving them a strong majority in the lower chamber. However, the Republicans would lose a seat in the Senate, giving the party two out of nine seats in the upper chamber.

In 2013, the governor, Eloy S. Inos, switched party affiliation from the Covenant Party to the Republican Party, thus making the governorship controlled by the Republican Party. This marked the final days of the Covenant Party as it officially dissolved in 2013, merging with the Republicans, leaving the GOP to remain unchallenged with the exception of independents candidates until the resurgence of the Democratic Party in 2020.

In 2014, Senator Frank M. Borja reported that the GOP on Tinian was in disarray because most islanders were affiliated with the party.

Before the 2020 general elections, the CNMI Republican Party was significantly stronger than the CNMI Democratic Party, which had not been represented in the legislature from 2010 to 2020, winning their last seat in the 2007 general elections.

== Positions ==
The CNMI Republican administration has stated that it does not want to get involved in national US debates on subjects such as immigration because of the CNMI's unique situation in United States politics.

Despite their position on national politics, the Republican-controlled CNMI government—which had a super-majority in the House and Senate in 2016—attempted to push for gun bans. When the gun ban was found unconstitutional, the CNMI government pushed for a $1000 excise tax, which was also found unconstitutional.

On September 21, 2018, Republican Governor Ralph Torres signed into law the Taulamwaar Sensible CNMI Cannabis Act, stating: "Today, our people made history. We took a stand to legalize marijuana in the CNMI for recreational, medical, and commercial use." This made the CNMI the first place in the United States to launch a commercial cannabis legalization system through an act of lawmakers rather than it being implemented by voters through a ballot initiative and also the first U.S. jurisdiction to go from completely outlawing cannabis to allowing recreational use without first having a medical marijuana program.
