= Northern Mariana Islands Commonwealth Legislature =

Territorial legislature of the Northern Mariana Islands

- 22nd Legislature

Type
- Type: Bicameral
- Houses: Senate; House of Representatives

Leadership
- Senate President: Karl King-Nabors (R) since July 23, 2025
- House Speaker: Edmund Villagomez (I) since January 13, 2021

Structure
- Seats: 29 voting members: 9 senators; 20 representatives
- Senate political groups: Republican (4); Independent (3); Democratic (2)
- House of Representatives political groups: Independent (13); Democratic (4); Republican (3)
- Length of term: Senate 4 years House 2 years
- Salary: $32,000 per year

Elections
- Last Senate election: November 8, 2022 (6 seats)
- Last House of Representatives election: November 8, 2022
- Next Senate election: November 5, 2024 (3 seats)
- Next House of Representatives election: November 5, 2024

The Northern Mariana Islands Commonwealth Legislature is the territorial legislature of the U.S. commonwealth of the Northern Mariana Islands. The legislative branch of the territory is bicameral, consisting of a 20-member lower House of Representatives, and an upper house Senate with nine senators. Representatives serve two-year terms and senators serve four-year terms, both without term limits. The territorial legislature meets in the commonwealth capital of Saipan.

Similar to the United States Congress, the Senate seats are divided into three districts (three seats each) whose boundaries are identical to those of the municipalities (except that the barely inhabited Northern Islands is incorporated with Saipan). The Constitution provides for the creation of a fourth district for the Northern Islands when the population exceeds 1,000. The Senate seats are divided into two classes, similar to the classes of senators in the United States, with one class consisting of a single senator from each district, and the second class consisting of two senators from each district. In the first election after the ratification of the Constitution, the senator with the third-highest number of votes held their seat for two years. Requirements for senator are a minimum age of 25, residence in the Commonwealth for five years, and a registered voter in the district represented. The Constitution permits a higher residence requirement to be legislated.

The House seats are elected from seven districts. Two districts have one seat each, one for Rota and the other for Tinian and Aguiguan. The remaining five districts elect multiple members, three with two members, and two with six members, and are all located on Saipan, with one also including the Northern Islands. The Constitution provides for the Northern Islands to be a separate district when the population exceeds the number of people represented by any Representative. Reapportionment occurs every 10 years following the census. Requirements for Representative are a minimum age of 21, residence in the Commonwealth for three years, and a registered voter in the district represented. As with the Senate, the Constitution permits the Legislature to enact a higher residence requirement.

The Legislature also has a youth congress, the Commonwealth of the Northern Mariana Islands Youth Congress.

The official flag of the Northern Mariana Islands

== History ==
The modern legislature was created under Secretarial Order No. 2989 by federal Interior Secretary Thomas S. Kleppe effective April 1, 1976, replacing the less autonomous Mariana Islands District Legislature. The cabinet-level order reorganized local government in the commonwealth to reflect its greater self-government, which had established a political union with the United States in the previous year under a public plebiscite.

The Commonwealth was officially established in January 1978, and as the constitution prescribed, the first House of Representatives had 14 members (12 from Saipan). Over the years, as permitted by the constitution, House membership was increased to 20 (18 from Saipan) beginning with the 16th Legislature in 2008, the Constitutional maximum.

The Northern Mariana Islands' election calendar was one of the few political divisions in the United States where general elections were held in odd-numbered years (along with Kentucky, Louisiana, Mississippi, New Jersey, and Virginia). After a non-voting delegate position was created in the United States Congress for the NMI in January 2009 and its election held in November 2008, a referendum was approved in the 2009 elections changing elections to even-numbered years by delaying the 2011 elections and lengthened all political terms by one year.

== See also ==
- Northern Mariana Islands House of Representatives
- Northern Mariana Islands Senate
- List of Northern Mariana Islands Governors
