= 2022 Northern Mariana Islands general election =

- Gubernatorial election
- November 8, 2022 (first round); November 25, 2022 (runoff)
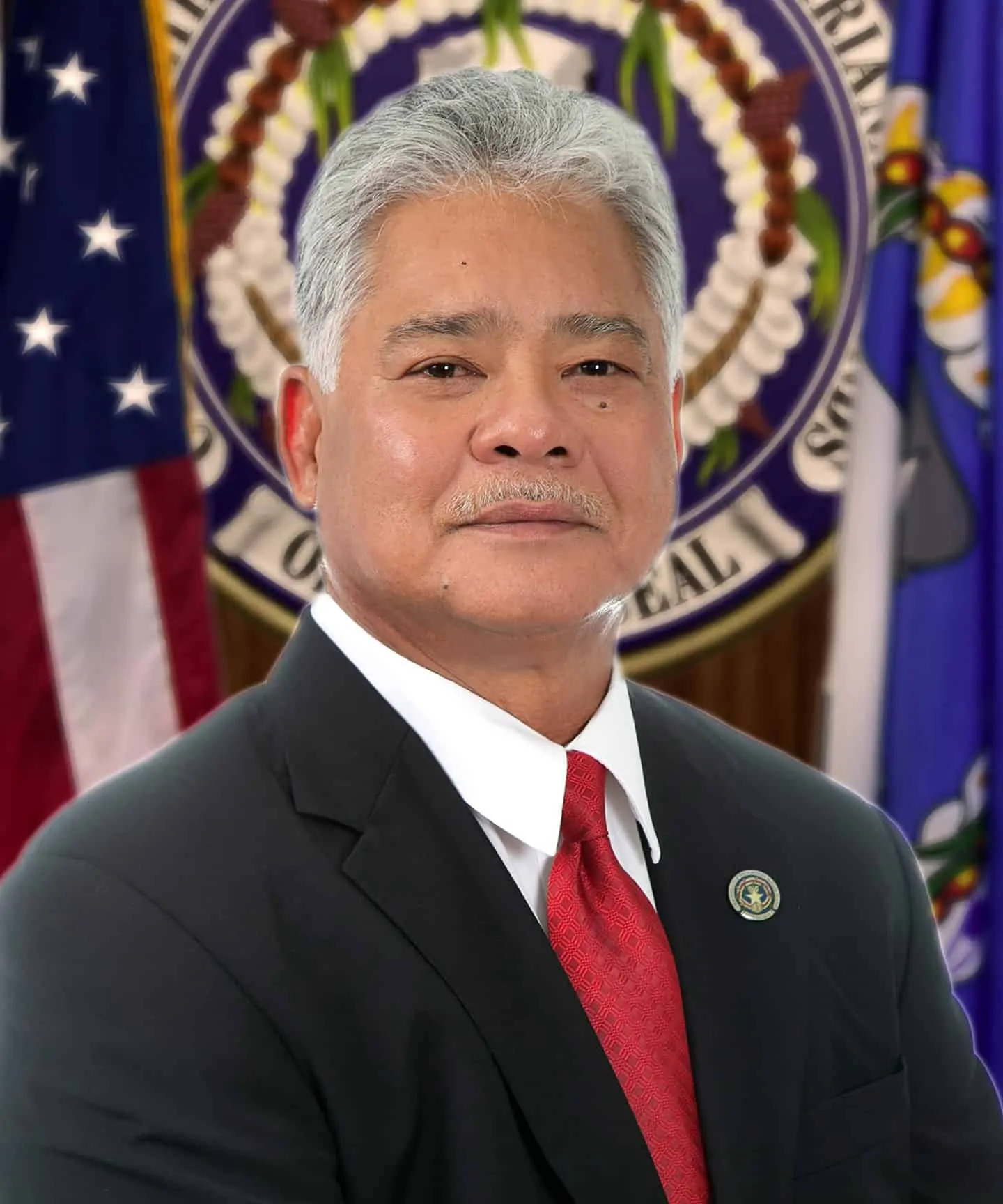

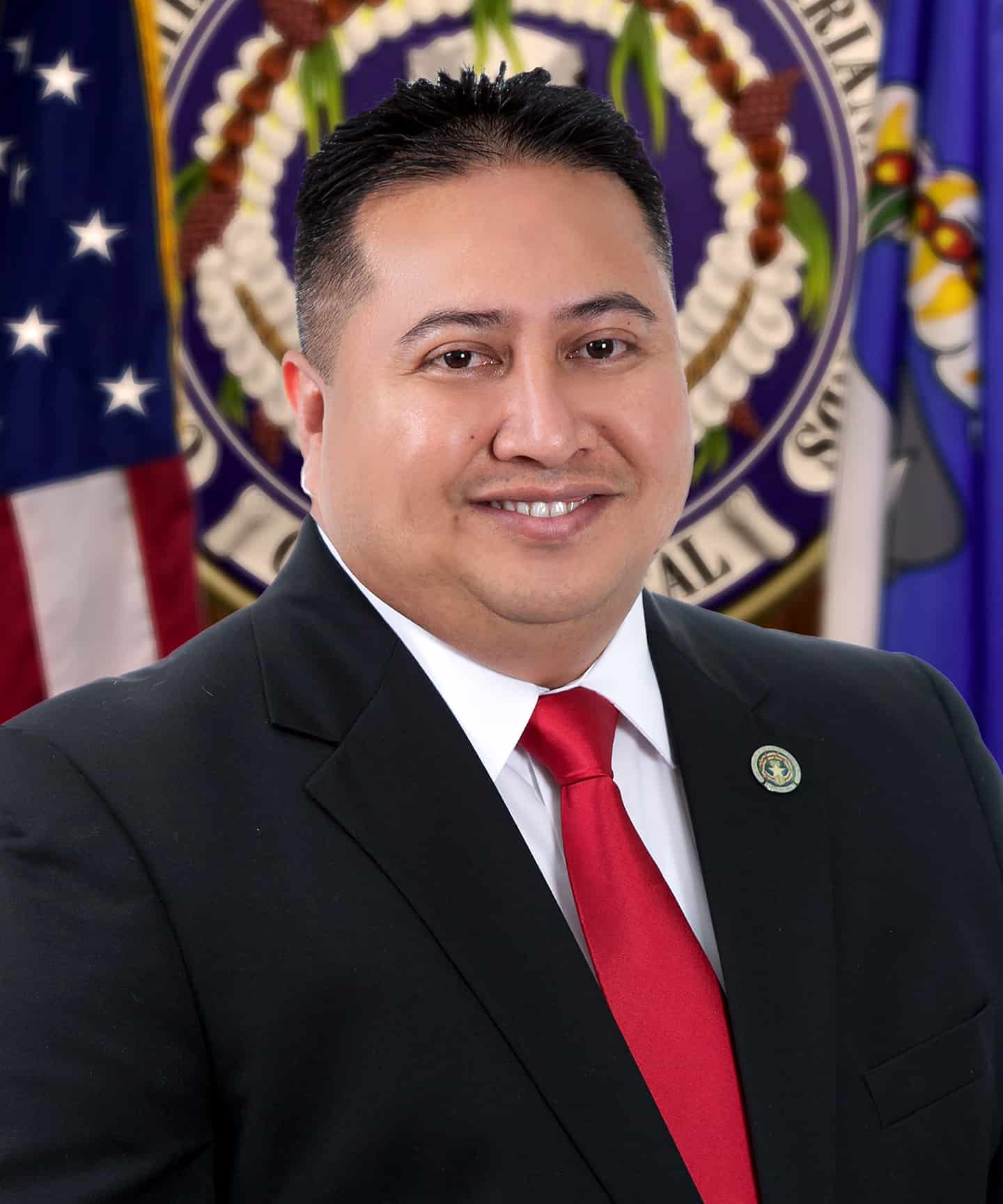
Nominee	Arnold Palacios	Ralph Torres
Party	Independent	Republican
Running mate	David Apatang	Vinnie Sablan
Popular vote	7,394	6,263
Percentage	54.14%	45.86%
- Results by voting district: Arnold Palacios: 50–55% 60–65% 65–70% Ralph Torres: 50–55% 65–70% 70–75%
Governor before election
Ralph Torres
Republican
Elected Governor
Arnold Palacios
Independent
- Delegate election
- November 8, 2022
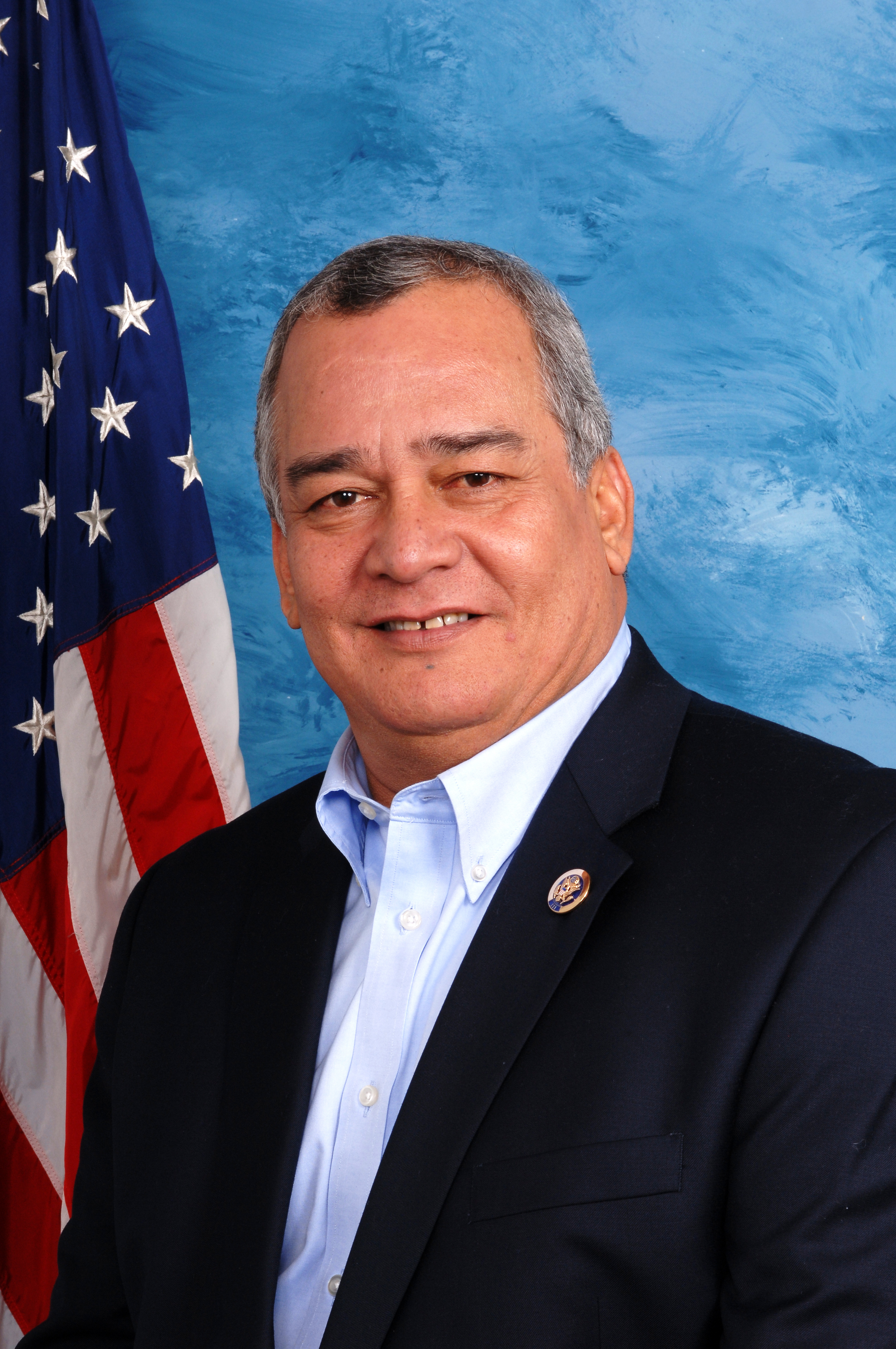

Nominee	Gregorio Sablan
Party	Democratic
Popular vote	12,315
Percentage	100.00%
Delegate before election
Gregorio Sablan
Independent
Elected Delegate
Gregorio Sablan
Democratic
- Senate election
- 6 of the 9 seats in the Senate; 5 seats needed for a majority
Party	Seats
Republican	4
Independents	3
Democratic	2
This lists parties that won seats. See the complete results below.
- House election
- All 20 seats in the House of Representatives; 11 seats needed for a majority
Party	Seats
Independents	13
Democratic	4
Republican	3
This lists parties that won seats. See the complete results below.
- Mayoral elections
- 4 Mayors
Party	Seats
Republican	3
Independents	1
This lists parties that won seats. See the complete results below.

The 2022 Northern Mariana Islands general election were held on November 8, 2022, corresponding with the 2022 United States general elections. Voters in the Northern Mariana Islands voted for the Governor of the Northern Mariana Islands, the non-voting delegate to the United States House of Representatives, attorney general, 6 seats in the Northern Mariana Islands Senate, all twenty seats in the Northern Mariana Islands House of Representatives, 4 mayors, seats for the municipal council, seats for the board of education, a justice, and 2 judges.

A runoff for the gubernatorial race were held on November 25, 2022. Total registered voters was 19,275. The general election saw turnout of 14,750 voters, or 76.52%, while the runoff saw a turnout of 13,094 voters, around 67.93%. This election saw the election of the CNMI's first independent governor and lieutenant governor. Both the CNMI Democratic Party and the CNMI Republican Party displayed lackluster results when compared to the independents in the Northern Mariana Islands House of Representatives. This election also saw the first time the Democratic Party contested the governorship since the 2014 Northern Mariana Islands general election (Note: In 2014, Edward Masga Deleon Guerrero ran in the 2014 Northern Mariana Islands general election for Governor of the Northern Mariana Islands) and the first time said party received more than 10% of the popular vote since the 2005 Northern Mariana Islands general election. (Note: In 2005, Froilan Cruz "Lang" Tenorio ran in the 2005 Northern Mariana Islands general election for Governor of the Northern Mariana Islands and won 18.11% of the popular vote)

== Background ==
The Republican Party entered the 2022 general election with the baggage of their lost trifecta from the 2020 general election, which saw the slumbering CNMI Democratic Party awaken and gain control of the Northern Mariana Islands House of Representatives through a coalition with several independent members and a single-seat in the Northern Mariana Islands Senate. The Republicans also dealt with several corruption scandals revolving around incumbent Governor Ralph Torres, though Judge pro tempore Alberto E. Tolentino's decision to not try Governor Torres until after the election cycle allowed the incumbent governor to participate in the election. This allowed a three-way race for the governorship between a resurgent Democratic Party, an incumbent Republican Party, and a former Republican turned Independent, to occur.

On the economic front, the COVID-19 pandemic and its aftermath caused a complete collapse of the local tourism industry, creating a massive economic burden on the territory. Flights between the CNMI and fellow US Territory Guam, as well as countries such as Japan and Korea, dropped to record lows or were suspended completely, severely damaging the economy. The worsening relations between the United States and China also signalled that Chinese tourists, once a cornerstone of the local tourism industry, will likely not return to the levels seen before the COVID-19 pandemic. The CNMI also witnessed a massive 73% decline in the number of foreign workers from 2001 to 2020, a sign of the lack of economic opportunity on the island and a key contributor to the declining population. The declining population has led to lower tax revenue and worse social services and economic conditions, leading to more people leaving and creating a cycle that is difficult to break and is placing pressure on the local government, especially on the incumbents.

The CNMI is also witnessing a healthcare system that is inadequate to meet the needs of the territory, with many taking trips to neighboring Guam to obtain the services they need.

== Gubernatorial election ==
Ralph Deleon Guerrero Torres, the incumbent republican governor ran for another term alongside running mate Vinson Flores "Vinnie" Sablan. Lieutenant Governor Arnold Indalecio Palacios, a career republican, also contested the seat as an independent with Saipan mayor David Mundo Apatang as his running mate. For the first time since the 2014 Northern Mariana Islands general election, the Democratic Party contested the gubernatorial race, nominating Northern Mariana Islands House of Representatives member and the first woman to be nominated for Governor of the Northern Mariana Islands, Christina Marie Elise Sablan (Tina Sablan). She chose fellow territorial representative Leila Haveia Fleming Clark Staffler as her running mate.

In the general election, Ralph Torres came in first with 38.83% of the vote, followed by Arnold Palacios at 33.15% and Tina Sablan at 28.01%. Because no candidate received more than 50% of the vote, a runoff between Ralph Torres and Arnold Palacios was held on 25 November 2022. Tina Sablan and Leila Staffler endorsed Arnold Palacios in the runoff, and Arnold Palacios and David Apatang signed a "unity pledge" with them promising action on several policy issues, including health care, labor, and infrastructure.

Arnold Palacios and David Apatang won the runoff election with 54.14% of the vote to 45.86% for Ralph Torres and Sablan. Palacios was the first independent elected Governor of the Northern Mariana Islands and the first independent to win a gubernatorial election in any U.S. state or territory since 2014. (Note: In 2014, Bill Walker was elected Governor of Alaska and Kenneth Mapp was elected Governor of the U.S. Virgin Islands.)

=== Candidates ===
==== Democratic Party ====
- Christina Marie Elise Sablan (Tina Sablan), former member of the Northern Mariana Islands House of Representatives (2008-2010 and 2019–2023)
  - Leila Haveia Fleming Clark Staffler, Staffler's former principal of Kagman High School (2013–2021) and former member of the Northern Mariana Islands House of Representatives (2021–2023)

==== Independents ====
- Arnold Indalecio Palacios, former lieutenant governor (2019–2023), former president of the Northern Mariana Islands Senate (2017–2019), former member of the Northern Mariana Islands Senate (2015–2019), former Secretary of Lands and Natural Resources (2012–2015), former Speaker of the House of Representatives of the Northern Mariana Islands (2008–2010)
  - David Mundo Apatang, Palacios' former Mayor of Saipan (2015–2023)

==== Republican Party ====
- Ralph Deleon Guerrero Torres, incumbent governor of the Northern Mariana Islands (serving since 2015), former lieutenant governor (2015), former president of the Northern Mariana Islands Senate (2013–2015), and former chairman of the Health & Welfare Committee (2010–2015)
  - Vinson Flores "Vinnie" Sablan, Torres' running mate and former member of the Northern Mariana Islands Senate (2019–2023)

=== Results ===
Northern Mariana Islands gubernatorial election
Party	Candidate	Running mate	First round		Second round	
Party	Candidate	Running mate	Votes	%	Votes	%
Independent	Arnold Indalecio Palacios	David Mundo Apatang	4,890	33.15%	7,394	54.14%
Republican	Ralph Deleon Guerrero Torres (incumbent)	Vinson Flores "Vinnie" Sablan	5,728	38.83%	6,263	45.86%
Democratic	Christina Marie Elise Sablan (Tina Sablan)	Leila Haveia Fleming Clark Staffler	4,132	28.01%		
Total			14,750	100%	13,657	100%
Independent gain from Republican						

== Delegate to the US House of Representatives ==
Incumbent Representative Gregorio Kilili Camacho Sablan, previously an independent who caucused with the Democratic Party, ran for re-election as the Democratic nominee for the first time in his career. Sablan, first elected in 2008, had held the seat since its creation in 2009. Delegate Gregorio Sablan was re-elected. The Northern Mariana Islands' non-voting delegate to the U.S. House of Representatives was elected for a two-year term.

Northern Mariana Islands's at-large congressional district
Party	Candidate	Votes	%
Democratic	Gregorio Kilili Camacho Sablan (incumbent)	12,315	100.00%
Total votes		12,315	100.00%
Democratic gain from Independent			

== Northern Mariana Islands Commonwealth Legislature ==
=== Results summary ===
Parties	House election results			Seat change	Party strength
Parties	2020	2021 (Note: A special election for Northern Mariana Islands House of Representatives District 3 was called for October 16, 2021 after the seat became vacant after Ivan A. Blanco (R) died while in office on July 23, 2021. Corina L. Magofna (D) won.)	2022	+/−	Party strength
Independent	3	3	13	10 ▲	65.00%
Democratic	8	9 (1▲)	4	5 ▼	20.00%
Republican	9	8 (1▼)	3	5 ▼	15.00%
Totals	20	20	20	Steady	100.00%

Parties	Senate election results		Seat change	Party strength
Parties	2020	2022	+/−	Party strength
Republican	5	4	1 ▼	44.44%
Independent	3	3	Steady	33.33%
Democratic	1	2	1 ▲	22.22%
Totals	9	9	Steady	100.00%

=== Senate ===
The Northern Mariana Islands Senate is the upper house of the Northern Mariana Islands Commonwealth Legislature, consisting of nine senators representing three senatorial districts (Saipan & the Northern Islands, Tinian & Aguijan, and Rota), each a multi-member district with three senators. Each district had two seats open for the 2022 elections.

Rota 1st Senatorial District (2 seats)
Party	Candidate	Votes	%
Independent	Donald Manalang Manglona	905	34.35%
Republican	Dennis James Camacho Mendiola	748	28.39%
Independent	Crispin Manglona Ogo	415	15.75%
Republican	Efraim Manglona Atalig	364	13.81%
Independent	Edward Castro Jr. Maratita	203	7.70%
Total votes		2,635	100.00%

Tinian 2nd Senatorial District (2 seats)
Party	Candidate	Votes	%
Republican	Francisco Quichuchu Cruz (incumbent)	932	43.13%
Republican	Jude Untalan Hofschneider (incumbent)	808	37.39%
Independent	Thomasa Rita Palacios Mendiola	421	19.48%
Total votes		2,161	100.00%

Saipan 3rd Senatorial District (2 seats)
Party	Candidate	Votes	%
Democratic	Celina Roberto Babauta	5,744	25.80%
Independent	Corina Lorraine Magofna	5,202	23.37%
Republican	Angel Aldan Demapan	4,887	21.95%
Republican	Janet Ulloa Maratita	3,651	16.40%
Independent	Andrew Sablan Salas	2,780	12.49%
Total votes		22,264	100.00%

=== House of Representatives ===
Electoral districts of the Northern Mariana Islands House of Representatives

The Northern Mariana Islands House of Representatives is the lower house of the Northern Mariana Islands Commonwealth Legislature. The house has seven districts, and five of the seven are multi-member districts. All twenty seats in the Northern Mariana Islands House of Representatives were contested in the 2022 election.

House of Representative - District 1: Saipan (6 seats)
Party	Candidate	Votes	%
Democratic	Edwin Kenneth Propst (incumbent)	2,296	11.21%
Independent	Vincent Raymond Seman Aldan (incumbent)	1,800	8.79%
Independent	Joseph Arriola Flores (incumbent)	1,771	8.64%
Republican	Roy Christopher Aldan Ada (incumbent)	1,754	8.56%
Democratic	Diego Vincent Fejeran Camacho (incumbent)	1,717	8.38%
Independent	Roman Cepeda Benavente (incumbent)	1,672	8.16%
Republican	Frankie Fernando Angel	1,637	7.99%
Independent	Raymond Ulloa Palacios	1,611	7.86%
Republican	Arlene Marie Mendiola Reyes	1,548	7.56%
Republican	Patrick Matagolai Cepeda	1,387	6.77%
Republican	Lucinda Rose Rosario Selepeo	1,273	6.21%
Independent	Shawn Byron Delos Reyes Kaipat	1,050	5.13%
Independent	Benjamin Cepeda	971	4.74%
Total votes		20,487	100.00%

House of Representative - District 2: Saipan (2 seats)
Party	Candidate	Votes	%
Independent	John Paul Palacios Sablan (incumbent)	825	37.20%
Independent	Manny Gregory Tenorio Castro	760	34.27%
Republican	Keith Cabrera Ada	340	15.33%
Republican	Eric Bayani Esteves	293	13.21%
Total votes		2,218	100.00%

House of Representative - District 3: Saipan (6 seats)
Party	Candidate	Votes	%
Independent	Blas Jonathan "BJ" Tenorio Attao (incumbent)	1,947	12.02%
Independent	Edmund Joseph Sablan Villagomez (incumbent)	1,945	12.00%
Independent	Ralph Naraja Yumul (incumbent)	1,590	9.81%
Democratic	Denita Kaipat Yangetmai (incumbent)	1,335	8.24%
Independent	Marissa Renee Flores	1,258	7.76%
Democratic	Vicente Castro Camacho (incumbent)	1,232	7.60%
Republican	Quaid Taima Ngirchongor	1,103	6.81%
Republican	Joaquin Sablan	1,011	6.24%
Independent	Delbert Taitano Pua	1,006	6.21%
Democratic	Lauren Yvonne Sonis Pangelinan	1,004	6.20%
Republican	Grace Sablan	982	9.06%
Republican	Carl Ogo Hocog	908	5.60%
Republican	Ana Demapan Castro	883	5.45%
Total votes		16,204	100.00%

House of Representative - District 4: Saipan & Northern Islands (4D) (2 seats)
Party	Candidate	Votes	%
Independent	Joel Castro Camacho (incumbent)	930	33.14%
Independent	Malcolm Omar	826	29.44%
Republican	Cecilia Remedio Taitano	594	21.17%
Republican	David Randy Reyes Sablan	456	16.25%
Total votes		2,806	100.00%

House of Representative - District 5: Saipan (2 seats)
Party	Candidate	Votes	%
Independent	Angelo Atalig Camacho	1,156	29.31%
Republican	Thomas John Dela Cruz Manglona	999	25.33%
Independent	Juan Ulloa Maratita	701	17.77%
Democratic	Peter Reyes Muna	603	15.29%
Independent	Ignacio Villagomez Cabrera	485	12.30%
Total votes		3,944	100.00%

House of Representative - District 6: Tinian (1 seat)
Party	Candidate	Votes	%
Republican	Patrick Hofschneider San Nicolas (incumbent)	736	61.74%
Democratic	Frederick Arend Dela Cruz	456	38.26%
Total votes		1,192	100.00%
Republican hold			

House of Representative - District 7: Rota (1 seat)
Party	Candidate	Votes	%
Independent	Julie Marie Atalig Ogo	623	43.87%
Republican	Ivan Mereb	481	33.87%
Independent	Edward Castro Barcinas	316	22.25%
Total votes		1,420	100.00%
Independent hold			

== Mayors ==
All four mayoral posts were up for election across the Commonwealth.

Mayor - Saipan
Party	Candidate	Votes	%
Independent	Ramon Jose Bias Camacho	4,503	38.04%
Republican	Joseph Leepan Tenorio Guerrero	4,184	35.34%
Democratic	Richard Tudela Lizama	3,152	26.62%
Total votes		11,839	100.00%
Independent gain from Republican			

Mayor - Tinian
Party	Candidate	Votes	%
Republican	Edwin Palacios Aldan (incumbent)	1,096	100.00%
Total votes		1,096	100.00%
Republican hold			

Mayor - Rota
Party	Candidate	Votes	%
Republican	Aubry Manglona Hocog	505	34.95%
Independent	Harry James Atalig Masga	470	32.53%
Independent	Teresita Apatang Santos	288	19.93%
Independent	Magdalena San Nicolas Mesngon	159	11.00%
Independent	Alfredo Taisacan Taimanao	23	1.59%
Total votes		1,445	100.00%
Republican hold			

Mayor - Northern Islands (4D)
Party	Candidate	Votes	%
Republican	Valentino Nicky Taisacan	109	63.74%
Independent	Jocelyn Frances Kapileo	62	36.26%
Total votes		171	100.00%
Republican hold			

== Attorney General ==
Attorney General (non-partisan)
Party	Candidate	Votes	%
Nonpartisan	Edward Eladio Manibusan	7,524	55.17%
Nonpartisan	Juan Tudela Lizama	6,113	44.83%
Total votes		13,637	100.00%

== Municipal Council ==
Municipal Council - Saipan & Northern Islands (4D) (non-partisan)
Party	Candidate	Votes	%
Nonpartisan	Marian Deleon Guerrero Tudela	5,419	18.91%
Nonpartisan	Carmen Cabrera Pangelinan	4,857	16.95%
Nonpartisan	Antonia Manibusan Tudela	4,522	15.78%
Nonpartisan	Liana Sablan Hofschneider	3,822	13.34%
Nonpartisan	Eusebio Camacho Borja	3,560	12.42%
Nonpartisan	Joseph Muna Mendiola	3,523	12.30%
Nonpartisan	Daniel Jr. Aquino	2,949	10.29%
Total votes		28,652	100.00%

Municipal Council - Tinian & Aguiguan (non-partisan)
Party	Candidate	Votes	%
Nonpartisan	Ana Marie Cruz San Nicolas	972	30.25%
Nonpartisan	Joseph Romaldo Evangelista Santos	930	28.94%
Nonpartisan	Estevan Pangelinan Cabrera	808	25.15%
Nonpartisan	Juanita Masga Mendiola	503	15.66%
Total votes		3,213	100.00%

Municipal Council - Rota (non-partisan)
Party	Candidate	Votes	%
Nonpartisan	Jonovan Hocog Lizama	924	25.17%
Nonpartisan	Frederick Jr. Atalig Manglona	855	23.29%
Nonpartisan	Jim Michael Atalig	658	17.92%
Nonpartisan	Lorita Mesngon Manglona	630	17.16%
Nonpartisan	Cecile Florence Blas	604	16.45%
Total votes		3,671	100.00%

== Board of education ==
Board of Education - Saipan & Northern Islands (4D) (non-partisan)
Party	Candidate	Votes	%
Nonpartisan	Andrew Lujan Orsini	7,312	66.75%
Nonpartisan	Robert Charles Harrel	3,643	33.25%
Total votes		10,955	100.00%

Board of Education - Tinian & Aguiguan (non-partisan)
Party	Candidate	Votes	%
Nonpartisan	Anotonio Ramon Lunag Borja	928	100.00%
Total votes		928	100.00%

== Justices ==
Justice	For retention		Against retention		Total
Justice	Votes	%	Votes	%	Total
John A. Manglona	11,014	82.85%	2,280	17.15%	13,294

== Judges ==
Judge	For retention		Against retention		Total
Judge	Votes	%	Votes	%	Total
Joseph Norita Camacho	10,180	74.90%	3,412	25.10%	13,592
Wesley Matthew Bogdan	9,033	71.84%	3,540	28.16%	12,573
