= 2026 Northern Mariana Islands general election =

- Gubernatorial election
- November 3, 2026 (1st round); November 20, 2026 (runoff)
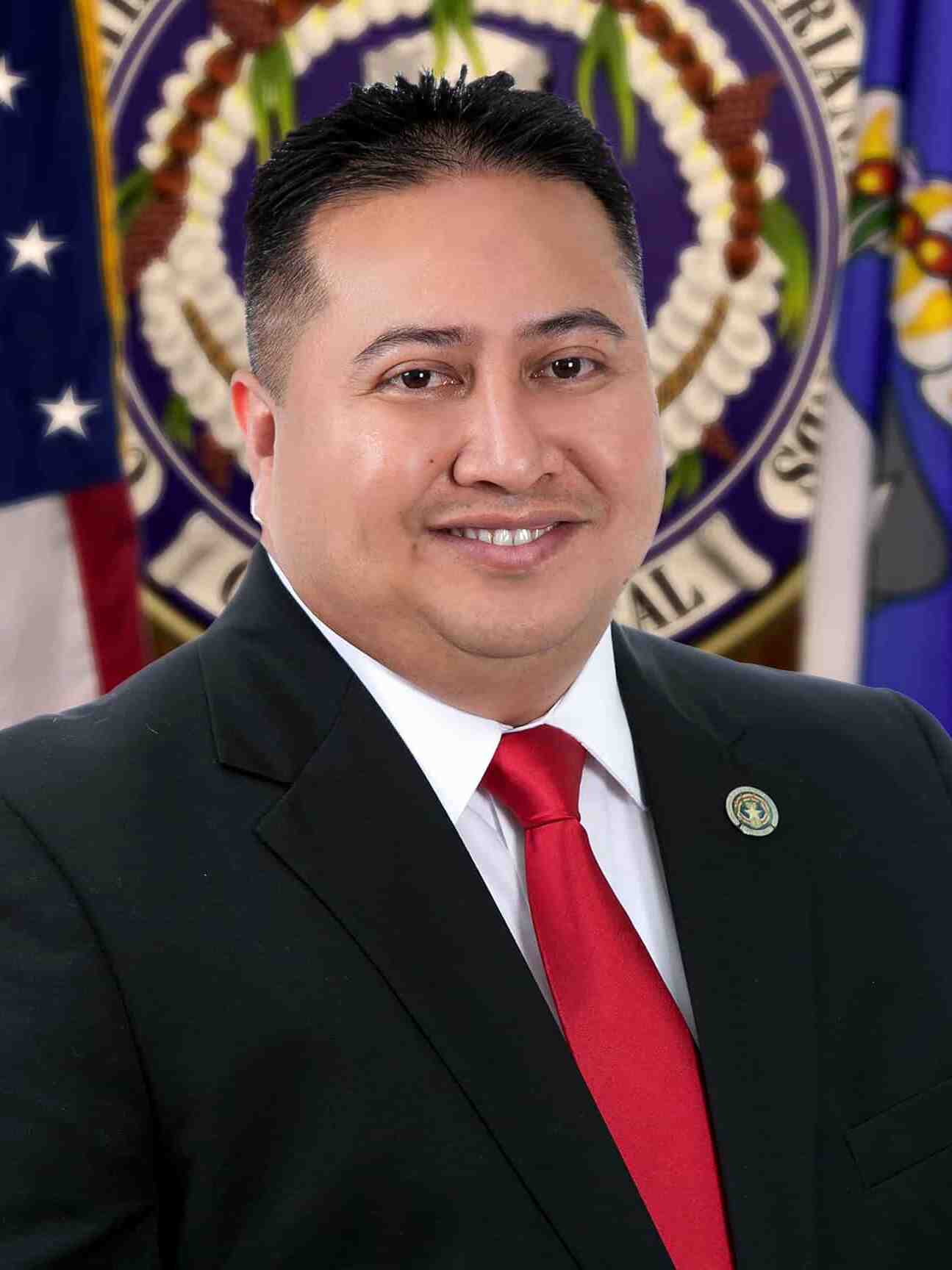

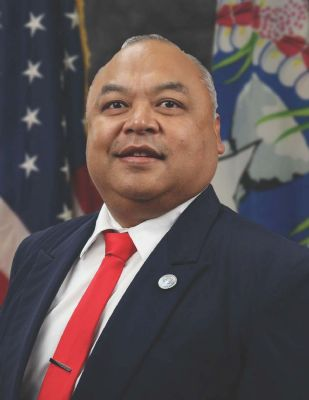

Nominee	Ralph Torres	Blas T. Attao	Lawrence F. Camacho
Party	Republican	Independent	Independent
Running mate	Ben Jones	Edmund Villagomez	Edith DeLeon Guerrero
Governor before election
David Apatang
Independent
Elected Governor
TBD
- Delegate election
- 3 November 2026
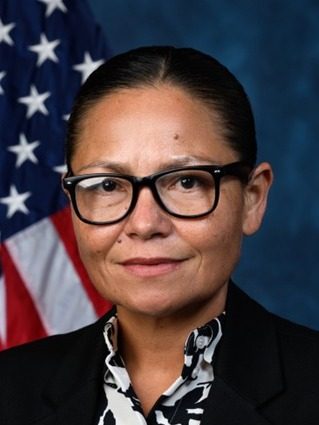

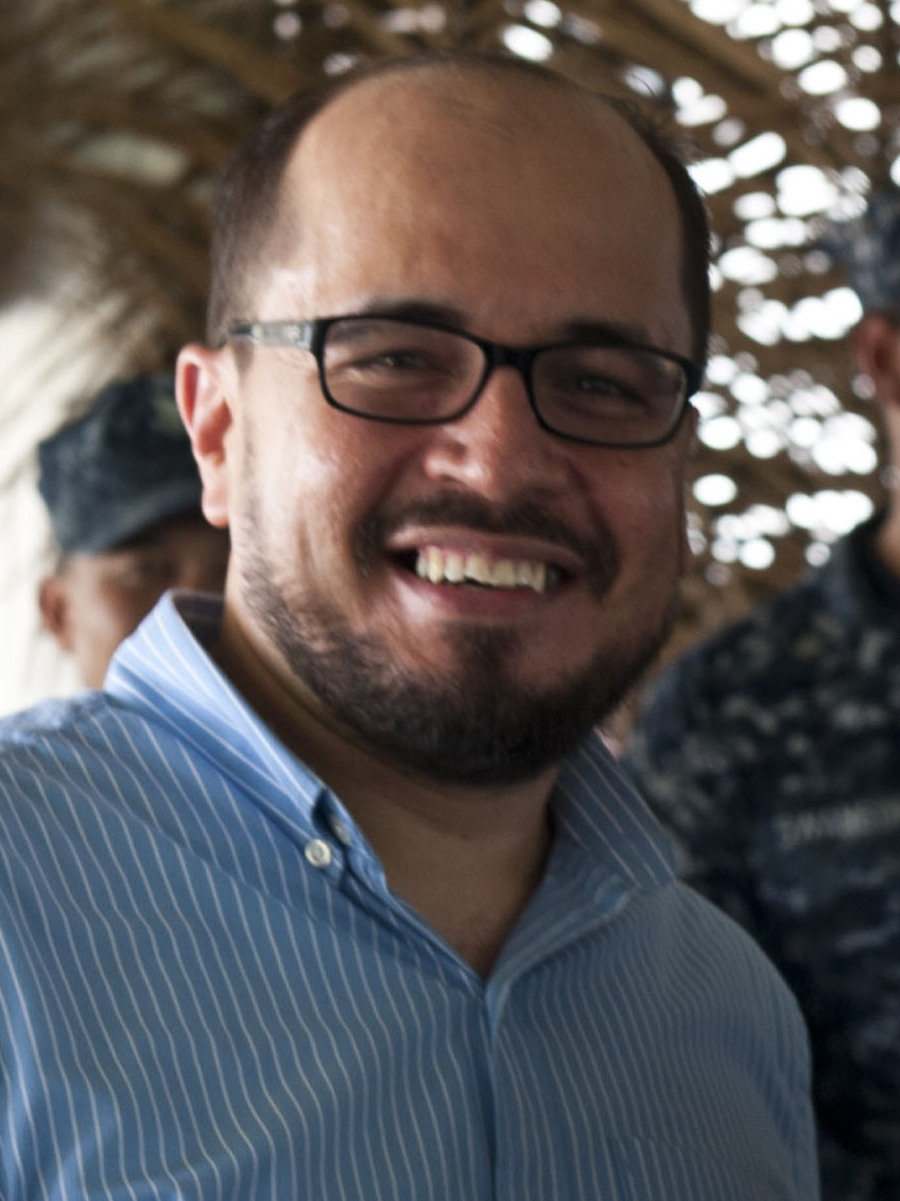
Nominee	Kimberlyn King-Hinds	Galvin Deleon Guerrero
Party	Republican	Independent
Popular vote	8,194	4,675
Percentage	63.7%	36.3%
Delegate before election
Kimberlyn King-Hinds
Republican
Elected Delegate
Kimberlyn King-Hinds
Republican
- Senate election
- 6 of the 9 seats in the Senate; 5 seats needed for a majority
Party	Seats
Republican	
Independents	
Democratic	
This lists parties that won seats. See the complete results below.
- House election
- All 20 seats in the House of Representatives; 11 seats needed for a majority
Party	Seats	+/–
Independents	15	−1
Republican	5	+3
Democratic	1	−1
This lists parties that won seats. See the complete results below.
- Mayoral elections
- 4 Mayors
Party	Seats	+/–
Republican	3	0
Independents	1	0
This lists parties that won seats. See the complete results below.

The 2026 Northern Mariana Islands General election was held on November 3, 2026, corresponding with the 2026 United States general elections. Voters in the Northern Mariana Islands voted for the Governor of the Northern Mariana Islands, the non-voting delegate to the United States House of Representatives, attorney general, 6 seats in the Northern Mariana Islands Senate, all twenty seats in the Northern Mariana Islands House of Representatives, 4 mayors, seats for the various municipal councils, and seats for the board of education. Incumbent governor David M. Apatang, while eligible for reelection, decided not to seek reelection for a full term after assuming office in 2025 after the death of Arnold Palacios.

Seventy-five candidates filed for the various offices up for election by the August 5th, 2026 deadline.

No candidate received a majority of the vote in the gubernatorial and attorney general elections, so runoffs will be held in both races on November 20.

== Background ==
Since 2023, a governing coalition made up of independents and Democrats has governed the Northern Mariana Islands. In the 2024 general election, Republicans won the open US delegate seat while independents not aligned with the Arnold Palacios administration made modest gains in the legislature. The Republican National Committee announced Palacios rejoined the Republican Party after the 2024 elections. Palacios’ return received a lukewarm to hostile reception from local Republicans.

Key issues for the 2026 election remain similar to the previous general elections, with the economy and corruption being key issues that many criticize Governor Palacios and the Democrat-Independent Coalition for failing to rectify. The island’s largest industry, tourism, have not recovered since the COVID-19 pandemic, and tourism have fallen compared to 2024 numbers. Another issue is the Administration’s hostility to reopening the Chinese tourism market, likely due to the declining relations between the United States and the People’s Republic of China. The decision by the U.S. Customs and Border Protection to abruptly stop processing travelers’ applications under the CNMI Economic Vitality & Security Travel Authorization Program (EVS-TAP) has crippled the Chinese tourism market for the CNMI. The two weekly flights by Hong Kong Airlines have been suspended until June 16 pending reinstatement of the program.

== Referendum results ==
Alexandro Cruz Castro was retained as Chief Justice of the Northern Mariana Islands, with preliminary votes showing he received 10,359 yes votes ( 85%) against 1,832 no votes (15%).

A proposal to convene a constitutional convention to amend the Commonwealth Constitution was supported by 63.7% of voters against 36.3% who opposed. However, this fell short of the two-thirds majority needed.

== Gubernatorial election ==
Governor Arnold Palacios was elected with 54.14% of the vote in the runoff election in 2022. He was eligible to run for re-election in 2026, but died on July 23, 2025. David M. Apatang, the incumbent governor sworn in on July 23, 2025, announced that he would not seek a full term. Former Governor Ralph Torres is the Republican nominee. Blas T. Attao, former speaker of the Northern Mariana Islands House of Representatives, and Lawrence F. Camacho, a former CNMI commissioner of education, are running as independent candidates.

== Delegate to the US House of Representatives ==
Republican Party president Joseph Lee Pan Guerrero has stated that reelecting Kimberlyn King-Hinds as Delegate remains the top priority for the party. On June 20th, 2025, Galvin S. Deleon Guerrero, the president of Northern Marianas College and nephew of former delegate Gregorio Sablan, announced his candidacy as an independent. However, the Commonwealth Election Commission listed him as a Democrat.

King-Hinds was reelected to a second term.

Results

Washington Delegate
Party	Candidate	Votes	%
Republican	Kimberlyn King-Hinds (incumbent)	8,194	63.7%
Independent	Galvin Sablan Deleon Guerrero	4,675	36.3%
Total votes		12,869	100.0%

== Attorney General ==
Edward Manibusan was reelected in 2022 with 55.17% of the vote against former judge Juan Tudela Lizama. Manibusan, who had been circulating petitions for his reelection, abruptly announced that he would not run for a fourth term. Officially, the position is a non-partisan position.

Candidates:

- Joaquin Deleon Guerrero Torres
- Jonathan Robert Glass
- Michael Norita Evangelista

== Northern Mariana Islands Commonwealth Legislature ==
=== Results Summary ===
Parties	House election results		Seat change	Party strength
Parties	2024	2026	+/−	Party strength
Independent	16	14	2 ▼	70.0%
Republican	2	5	3 ▲	25.0%
Democratic	2	1	1 ▼	5.0%
Totals	20	20	Steady	100.00%

=== Senate ===
Six of the nine seats of the Northern Mariana Islands Senate will be up for reelection.

==== District 1 ====
District 1 is coterminous with the island of Rota. In 2022, Dennis C. Mendiola and Donald M. Manglona were elected to the Senate to represent District 1. In 2025, Mendiola was elevated to the lieutenant governor and succeeded by Paul Manglona.

Candidates:

- Tito Songao Hocog II (Republican)
- Robert Jr Harrison Myers (Independent), attorney.
- Donald Manalang Manglona (Independent), incumbent senator

Results

Rota 1st Senatorial District (2 seats)
Party	Candidate	Votes	%
Independent	Donald M. Manglona (incumbent)	858	42.0%
Republican	Tito Songao Hocog II	773	37.9%
Independent	Robert Jr Harrison Myers	410	20.1%
Total votes		2,041	100.0%

==== District 2 ====
District 2 is coterminous with Tinian Municipality. In 2022, incumbents Jude Hofschneider and Francisco Q. Cruz were reelected to represent District 2. Hofschneider and Cruz are running unopposed.

Candidates:

- Jude Hofschneider (Republican), incumbent senator
- Francisco Quichuchu Cruz (Republican), incumbent senator

Results

Tinian 2nd Senatorial District (2 seats)
Party	Candidate	Votes	%
Republican	Francisco Quichuchu Cruz (incumbent)	892	52.5%
Republican	Jude Hofschneider (incumbent)	806	47.5%
Total votes		1,698	100.0%

==== District 3 ====
District 3 includes Saipan and the Northern Islands. In 2022, Celina Babauta and Corina Magofna were elected to represent District 3.

Candidates:

- Celina Roberto Babauta (Democratic), incumbent senator (2023-present)
- Vicente Castro Camacho (Independent), former member of the CNMI House of Representatives (2021-2025)
- Corina Lorraine Magofna (Independent), incumbent senator (2023-present)
- Marco Taisakan Peter (Republican), former member of the CNMI House of Representatives (2019-2021)
- Edwin Raymond Borja Quitugua (Independent)
- Vinnie Vinson Flores Sablan (Republican), former senator (2019-2025)
- Crispin Manglona Sablan (Independent)

Results

Saipan 3rd Senatorial District (2 seats)
Party	Candidate	Votes	%
Republican	Vinnie Sablan	5,569	28.7%
Democratic	Celina Roberto Babauta (incumbent)	4,656	24.0%
Republican	Marco Taisakan Peter	3,135	16.1%
Independent	Corina Lorraine Magofna (incumbent)	2,455	12.6%
Independent	Vicente Castro Camacho	1,536	7.9%
Independent	Crispin Manglona Sablan	1,375	7.1%
Independent	Edwin Raymond Borja Quitugua	706	3.6%
Total votes		19,432	100.0%

=== House of Representatives ===
Electoral districts of the Northern Mariana Islands House of Representatives

The election for all 20 seats in the House of Representatives will be held. Incumbents Blas T. Attao and Edmund Villagomez are retiring to run together on an independent ticket for governor and lieutenant governor respectively.

==== District 1 ====
District 1 has all six seats open for the 2026 elections. There are thirteen candidates competing.

Candidates:

- Roy Ada (Republican), incumbent representative and minority leader
- Vincent Seman Aldan (Independent)
- Roman C. Benavente (Independent)
- Alfredo Javier Cabael (Republican), operator of Fritz Pacific Construction
- Diego Camacho (Independent), incumbent representative
- Patrick Matagolai Cepeda (Republican), former president of the CNMI Republican Party
- Ricardo Castro Cruz Jr. (Democratic)
- Cecilia Remedio Taitano Fitial (Republican)
- Joseph A. Flores (Independent), incumbent representative
- John Deleon Guerrero Demapan Jr. (Republican)
- Janet Maratita (Independent), former representative (2006-2008, 2011-2015, and 2017-2021)
- Raymond Ulloa Palacios (Independent), incumbent representative
- Benusto Piteg (Republican)

Results

House of Representative - District 1: Saipan (6 seats)
Party	Candidate	Votes	%
Republican	Roy Ada (incumbent)	1,736	9.8%
Independent	Vincent Seman Aldan (incumbent)	1,656	9.3%
Independent	Diego Camacho (incumbent)	1,602	9.0%
Independent	Janet Maratita	1,513	8.5%
Independent	Raymond Ulloa Palacios (incumbent)	1,493	8.4%
Independent	Joseph A. Flores (incumbent)	1,437	8.1%
Independent	Roman C. Benavente (incumbent)	1,433	8.1%
Republican	Cecilia Taitano Fitial	1,349	7.6%
Republican	John DLG Demapan Jr.	1,343	7.6%
Republican	Patrick Matagolai Cepeda	1,188	6.7%
Democratic	Ricardo Castro Cruz Jr.	1,158	6.5%
Republican	Benusto Piteg	1,087	6.1%
Republican	Alfredo Javier Cabael	774	4.4%
Total votes		17,769	100.0%

==== District 2 ====
District 2 has all two seats open for the 2026 elections. There are three candidates competing.

Candidates:

- Keith Cabrera Ada (Republican)
- Daniel I. Aquino (Independent), incumbent representative
- John Sablan (Independent), incumbent representative

Results

House of Representative - District 2: Saipan (2 seats)
Party	Candidate	Votes	%
Independent	John Paul P. Sablan (incumbent)	670	40.7%
Independent	Daniel I. Aquino (incumbent)	606	36.8%
Republican	Keith Cabrera Ada	369	22.4%
Total votes		1,645	100.0%

==== District 3 ====
District 3 has all six seats open for the 2026 elections. Twelve candidates competed for six seats. Steve Kap Soo Jang, who finished sixth for the six seats, became the first Korean-born person elected to the Northern Mariana Islands House of Representatives.

Candidates:

- Edward C Arriola Jr. (Republican)
- Gabriel Boki Babauta (Democratic), former representative (1988-1992)
- Del Ariel Benson (Republican), businessman
- Marissa Flores (Independent), incumbent representative
- Steve Kap Soo Jang (Independent), restaurant owner and member of the Commonwealth Zoning Board
- Quaid Taima Ogumoro Ngirchongor (Republican)
- Andrew Lujan Orsini (Republican), incumbent member of the Northern Mariana Islands Board of Education
- Elias Jerome Malite Rangamar (Independent), incumbent representative
- Yvette Reyes Sablan (Republican)
- Denita Yangetmai (Democratic), incumbent representative
- Ralph N. Yumul (Independent), incumbent representative

Results

House of Representative - District 3: Saipan (6 seats)
Party	Candidate	Votes	%
Independent	Marissa Flores (incumbent)	1,541	11.2%
Independent	Elias Malite Rangamar (incumbent)	1,378	10.0%
Independent	Ralph N. Yumul (incumbent)	1,353	9.8%
Republican	Edward C. Arriola Jr.	1,223	8.9%
Republican	Andrew Lujan Orsini	1,200	8.7%
Independent	Steve Kap Soo Jang	1,199	8.7%
Republican	Yvette Reyes Sablan	1,102	8.0%
Democratic	Denita Yangetmai (incumbent)	1,101	8.0%
Republican	Quaid Taima Ogumoro Ngirchongor	1,024	7.4%
Republican	Del Ariel Benson	922	6.7%
Independent	Carlos Ebert Santos	896	6.5%
Democratic	Gabriel "Boki" Babauta	853	6.2%
Total votes		13,792	100.0%

==== District 4 ====
District 4 has all two seats open for the 2026 elections. There are three candidates competing.

Candidates:

- James Kennedy Weilbacher DLG Benjamin (Republican)
- Joel Castro Camacho (Independent), incumbent representative
- Malcolm Omar (Republican), incumbent representative

Results

House of Representative - District 4: Saipan & Northern Islands (4D) (2 seats)
Party	Candidate	Votes	%
Republican	James Kennedy Weilbacher DLG Benjamin	849	38.1%
Independent	Joel Castro Camacho (incumbent)	772	34.7%
Republican	Malcolm Omar (incumbent)	605	27.2%
Total votes		2,226	100.0%

==== District 5 ====
District 5 has all two seats open for the 2026 elections. There are four candidates competing.

Candidates:

- Ted Anthony Deleon Guerrero (Republican)
- Peter Francis Reyes Muna (Democratic), teacher
- Leila Staffler (Democratic), secretary of the Department of Labor (2023-present) and former representative (2021-2023)
- Angelo Atalig Camacho (independent), incumbent representative

Results

House of Representative - District 5: Saipan (2 seats)
Party	Candidate	Votes	%
Democratic	Leila Haveia Fleming Clark Staffler	1,344	37.6%
Independent	Angelo Atalig Camacho	958	26.8%
Republican	Ted Anthony Deleon Guerrero	646	18.1%
Democratic	Peter Francis Reyes Muna	628	17.6%
Total votes		3,576	100.0%

==== District 6 ====
District 6 has its one seat open for the 2026 elections. There is one candidate competing.

Candidates:

- Joseph Evangelista Santos (Republican), incumbent chairman of the Tinian Municipal Council

Results

House of Representative - District 6: Tinian & Aguiguan (1 seat)
Party	Candidate	Votes	%
Republican	Joseph Romaldo Evangelista Santos	909	100.0%
Total votes		909	100.0%

==== District 7 ====
District 7 has its one seat open for the 2026 elections. There is one candidate competing.

Candidates:

- Julie Ogo (Independent), incumbent representative

Results

House of Representative - District 7: Rota (1 seat)
Party	Candidate	Votes	%
Independent	Julie Marie Atalig Ogo	962	100.0%
Total votes		962	100.0%

== Local elections ==
=== Mayors ===
==== Northern Islands ====
Valentino Nicky Taisacan was elected in 2022 with 63.74% of the vote. He is running for reelection. Keli Tenorio is the Republican nominee. Keli Tenorio is facing a challenge to her residency.

Mayor - Northern Islands
Party	Candidate	Votes	%
Republican	Keli Aiken Tenorio	88	60.3%
Independent	Valentino Taisacan Jr. (incumbent)	58	39.7%
Total votes		146	100.0%

==== Rota ====
Incumbent mayor Aubry Manglona Hocog was elected to office in 2022 with 34.95% of the vote against four other candidates. She is running for reelection unopposed.

Mayor - Rota
Party	Candidate	Votes	%
Republican	Aubry Manglona Hocog	1,111	100.0%
Total votes		1,111	100.0%

==== Saipan ====
Ramon Jose Blas "RB" Camacho was elected in 2022 with 38.04% of the vote against two other candidates. Mayor Camacho is running for reelection. RB Camacho is opposed by Joseph M. Mendiola. A second challenger, Luis Sablan, filed, but was removed by the Commonwealth Election Commission. Joel C. Camacho, a member of the Northern Mariana Islands House of Representatives from Precinct #4, withdrew from challenging his uncle citing the aftermath of Typhoon Sinlaku.

Mayor - Saipan
Party	Candidate	Votes	%
Independent	Ramon "RB" Jose Blas Camacho	8,331	81.5%
Independent	Joseph Muna Mendiola	1,892	18.5%
Total votes		10,223	100.0%

==== Tinian ====
Mayor Edwin P. Aldan is term-limited and cannot run for reelection. On April 11th, 2026, Antonio San Nicolas Borja, who served as Tinian's representative in the CNMI House of Representatives during the 21st Commonwealth Legislature, defeated incumbent Tinian representative Patrick H. San Nicolas for the Republican nomination for mayor. Borja won with an overwhelming 543 votes to San Nicolas' 180 votes. San Nicolas is running unopposed.

Mayor - Tinian
Party	Candidate	Votes	%
Republican	Antonio San Nicolas Borja	976	100.0%
Total votes		976	100.0%

=== Municipal councils ===
Elections for the municipal councils will be held.

Municipal Council - Saipan & Northern Islands (non-partisan) (3 seats)
Party	Candidate	Votes	%
Nonpartisan	Anthony Tenorio Benavente	6,935	34.6%
Nonpartisan	Marian DLG Tudela (incumbent)	6,801	33.9%
Nonpartisan	Antonia Manibusan Tudela (incumbent)	6,307	31.5%
Total votes		20,043	100.0%

Municipal Council - Tinian & Aguiguan (non-partisan) (3 seats)
Party	Candidate	Votes	%
Nonpartisan	Anne Marie Cruz San Nicolas (incumbent)	855	34.4%
Nonpartisan	Chad Ellie Palacios	852	34.2%
Nonpartisan	Wally Flores Villagomez	782	31.4%
Total votes		2,489	100.0%

Municipal Council - Saipan & Northern Islands (non-partisan) (3 seats)
Party	Candidate	Votes	%
Nonpartisan	Jonovan Hocog Lizama (incumbent)	966	34.3%
Nonpartisan	Sandra Mesngon Masga	942	33.5%
Nonpartisan	Tillie Castro Taimanao	908	32.2%
Total votes		2,816	100.0%

== Board of education ==
Elections will be held for the board of education.

Board of Education - Saipan & Northern Islands (non-partisan) (1 seat)
Party	Candidate	Votes	%
Nonpartisan	Daniel Ogo Quitugua	7,840	100.0%
Total votes			100.0%

== Judiciary ==
Justice	For retention		Against retention		Total
Justice	Votes	%	Votes	%	Total
Chief Justice Alexandro Cruz Castro	10,359	84.97%	1,832	15.03%	12,191
