= 2024 Northern Mariana Islands general election =

- 5 November 2024
- Delegate election
- 5 November 2024
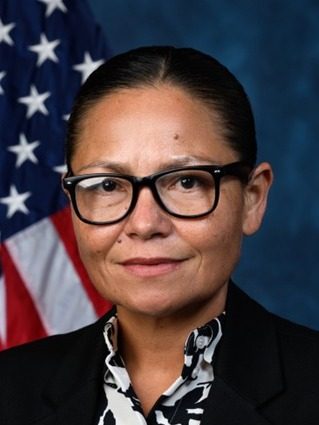

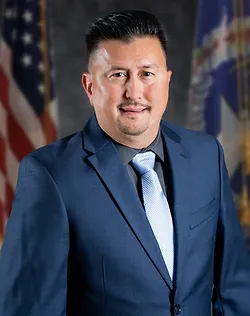

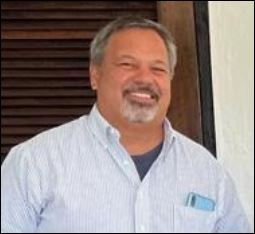
| Nominee | Kimberlyn King-Hinds | Ed Propst |
| Party | Republican | Democratic |
| Popular vote | 4,931 | 4,067 |
| Percentage | 40.34% | 33.27% |
| Nominee | John "Bolis" Gonzales | James Michael Rayphand |
| Party | Independent | Independent |
| Popular vote | 2,282 | 665 |
| Percentage | 18.67% | 5.44% |
Delegate before election
Gregorio Sablan
Independent
Elected Delegate
Kimberlyn King-Hinds
Republican
- Senate election
- 3 of the 9 seats in the Senate; 5 seats needed for a majority
| Party | Vote % | Seats | +/– |
|---|---|---|---|
| Democratic | 43.56 | 1 | 0 |
| Republican | 6.75 | 1 | 0 |
| Independents | 49.69 | 1 | 0 |
This lists parties that won seats. See the complete results below.
- House election
- All 20 seats in the House of Representatives; 11 seats needed for a majority
| Party | Vote % | Seats | +/– |
|---|---|---|---|
| Republican | 12.45 | 2 | −1 |
| Democratic | 11.78 | 2 | −2 |
| Independents | 75.78 | 16 | +3 |
This lists parties that won seats. See the complete results below.

The 2024 Northern Mariana Islands general election was held on Tuesday, November 5, 2024, corresponding with the 2024 United States general elections. Voters in the Northern Mariana Islands chose the non-voting delegate to the United States House of Representatives, 3 seats in the Northern Mariana Islands Senate, all twenty seats in the Northern Mariana Islands House of Representatives, seats for the municipal council, and seats for the board of education.

== Background ==
On the economic front, the Northern Mariana Islands faces many problems that were present in the 2022 general election. The territory is still attempting to recover after the COVID-19 pandemic and its aftermath caused a complete collapse of the local tourism industry, creating a massive economic burden on the territory. Airlines have sent mixed signals on tourism recovery. Asiana Airlines suspended its flights and switched to a charter schedule until June 2024, citing low demand and the Commonwealth Ports Authority (CPA) adoption of a 90 percent hike in landing fees and a 79 percent increase in terminal rental fees back in September 2023. Jeju airlines also expressed concerned about the airport landing fees. Pressure from airlines was enough to convince the CPA to lower airport fees, announced on May 10, 2024. Despite this, on June 7, 2024, Asiana Airlines announced the closure of its CNMI operations by the end of June. However, United Airlines and Hong Kong Airlines show positive attitudes towards economic recovery. Dan Weiss, United Airlines managing director for Global Government and Regulatory Affairs, stated that United is pleased with the performance of their “relatively new” Saipan-Tokyo Narita service. After suspending its flights from Hong Kong to Saipan in 2019, Hong Kong Airlines announced that it would reintroduce its exclusive direct route to Saipan. Despite confidence from Hong Kong Airlines, the worsening relations between the United States and China signals that Chinese and Hong Kong tourists, once a cornerstone of the local tourism industry, will likely not return to the levels seen before the COVID-19 Pandemic. Less tourists from China will likely negatively impact the economy because, as Marianas Visitors Authority board chair Gloria Cavanagh points out, based on numbers the MVA has collected, Chinese tourists coming into the CNMI outspend their Korean counterparts by multiple times. However, it appears that Chinese tourists, despite tensions with the United States, as well as Japanese and Korean tourists, despite their ongoing economic woes with a weaker Yen and Won compared to the Dollar, continue to come to the CNMI as the number of tourists have increased in January, February, and March of 2024 compared to the same months in 2023, though still below pre-pandemic levels. The stronger Dollar and weaker Yen and Won will still pose issues for the CNMI as competition from countries in East and Southeast Asia become more attractive to Korean and Japanese tourists.

On April 29, 2024, Hyatt Regency Saipan announced that it was ceasing operations in the CNMI starting June 30, the same time as Asiana Airlines will end its services. The news shocked and concerned the CNMI, with Governor Arnold Palacios stating that he and his administration were not notified before the announcement. The halting of operation by both Hyatt Regency and Asiana Airlines signals that the CNMI economy is still struggling heavily, and there are now heightened concerns of other companies pulling the plug on the CNMI.

The declining population has led to lower tax revenue and worse social services and economic conditions, leading to more people leaving and creating a cycle that is difficult to break and is placing pressure on the local government, especially on the incumbents.

A defining aspect of Governor Arnold Palacios' Administration is austerity. On April 24, 2023, the Palacios Administration placed some executive branch employees on a 72-hour work schedule, reduced from 80 hours. On October 4, 2023, Palacios reduced the work schedule to 70 hours. Governor Palacios and his administration, through Directive 2024–1, also continued "Austerity Monday," which began in October 2020 when his predecessor, former Governor Ralph Torres, implemented it. Austerity Monday calls for the government to be closed every Monday following a payday or on a Tuesday if that Monday happens to be a holiday. The Commonwealth Ports Authority board also adopted an eight-hour cut for all CPA employees and suspended its airline incentive program. Palacios and his coalition government implemented these measures to address fiscal issues but have placed significant strain on the local economy and could pose an issue to the current governing coalition of Independents and Democrats.

The mixed recovery, coupled with the strong push for austerity by the Palacios Administration, has created discontent among local small businesses, many of whom have voiced that the government could be doing more to support the local economy and its fledgling and crippled businesses. The economic situation has created a scenario where locals, especially government officials and small businesses, watch for any docking cruise ship whose passengers disembark to spend and help prop up the local economy.

Since the 2022 general election, the Northern Mariana Islands House of Representatives has comprised mainly independents, with thirteen seats compared to the three held by the Republicans and the four held by the Democrats. The Northern Mariana Islands Senate has Independents as the second largest bloc with three seats, behind the Republicans, who hold four seats, but ahead of the Democrats, who hold two seats. This is a rarity in the United States, where the Democrats and Republicans rarely ever face a unified independent bloc or viable third parties, and places the Northern Mariana Islands, which has a recent record of successful third parties and independent majorities, in a unique politician position.

The CNMI is also witnessing a healthcare system that is inadequate to meet the needs of the territory, with many taking trips to neighboring Guam to obtain the services they need.

== Candidates ==
On January 18, 2024, Delegate Gregorio Sablan, a Democrat, announced that he will not be seeking reelection and endorsed fellow Democrat and current majority leader of the Northern Mariana Islands House of Representatives, Ed Propst. Sablan, first elected in 2008, had held the seat since its creation in 2009. The CNMI Democratic Party endorsed Ed Propst. The CNMI Republican Party endorsed Kimberlyn King-Hinds, former chair of the Commonwealth Ports Authority Board of Directors, as their candidate after John "Bolis" Gonzales, business consultant and independent candidate for U.S. House in 2008, withdrew from the primary, citing the primary being only for party members as his reason, and announced that he will be running as an independent. Liana M.S. Hofschneider, Matua Council for Native Chamorro Advancement president, announced her bid for bid and will be running as an independent, but self declared as a "nonpartisan candidate." The Northern Mariana Islands' non-voting delegate to the U.S. House of Representatives are elected for a two-year term.

== Results ==
=== Delegate ===
2024 United States House of Representatives election in Northern Mariana Islands
| Party | Candidate | Votes | % |
|---|---|---|---|
| Republican | Kimberlyn Kay King-Hinds | 4,931 | 40.34% |
| Democratic | Edwin Kenneth Propst | 4,067 | 33.27% |
| Independent | John Oliver Delos Reyes Gonzales | 2,282 | 18.67% |
| Independent | James Michael Rayphand | 665 | 5.44% |
| Independent | Liana Sablan Hofschneider | 280 | 2.29% |
| Total votes | | 12,225 | 100.0% |
| Republican gain from Democratic | | | |

== Northern Mariana Islands Commonwealth Legislature ==
=== Results summary ===
| Parties | Senate election results | | | Seat change | Party strength | Votes | Votes Percentage |
| Parties | 2022 | 2024 (Note: Senator Edith E. DeLeon Guerrero switched from Democrat to Independent) | 2024 | +/− | Party strength | Votes | Votes Percentage |
|---|---|---|---|---|---|---|---|
| Independent | 3 | 4 ▲ | 3 | 1 ▼ | 33.33% | 5,907 | 49.69% |
| Republican | 4 | 4 | 4 | Steady | 44.44% | 803 | 6.75% |
| Democratic | 2 | 1 (▼) | 2 | 1 ▲ | 22.22% | 5,178 | 43.56% |
| Totals | 9 | 9 | 9 | Steady | 100.00% | 11,888 | 100.00% |

| Parties | House election results | | Seat change | Party strength | Votes | Votes Percentage |
| Parties | 2022 | 2024 | +/− | Party strength | Votes | Votes Percentage |
|---|---|---|---|---|---|---|
| Republican | 3 | 2 | 1 ▼ | 10.00% | 4,473 | 12.45% |
| Independent | 13 | 16 | 3 ▲ | 80.00% | 27,226 | 75.78% |
| Democratic | 4 | 2 | 2 ▼ | 22.22% | 4,231 | 11.78% |
| Totals | 20 | 20 | Steady | 100.00% | 35,930 | 100.00% |

=== Senate ===
The Northern Mariana Islands Senate is the upper house of the Northern Mariana Islands Commonwealth Legislature, consisting of nine senators representing three senatorial districts (Saipan & the Northern Islands, Tinian & Aguijan, and Rota), each a Multi-member district with three senators. The governing Democrat-Independent coalition is entering the 2024 election cycle with five of nine seats, a majority over the four seats controlled by the Republicans. Three of the nine seats of the Northern Mariana Islands Senate will be up for reelection.

==== By district ====
Rota 1st Senatorial District (1 seat)
| Party | Candidate | Votes | % |
|---|---|---|---|
| Independent | Ronnie Mendiola Calvo | 676 | 52.24% |
| Independent | Paul Atalig Manglona (incumbent) | 618 | 47.76% |
| Total votes | | 1,294 | 100.00% |
| Independent hold | | | |

Tinian 2nd Senatorial District (1 seat)
| Party | Candidate | Votes | % |
|---|---|---|---|
| Republican | Karl Rosario King-Nabors (incumbent) | 803 | 100.00% |
| Total votes | | 803 | 100.% |
| Republican hold | | | |

Saipan 3rd Senatorial District (1 seat)
| Party | Candidate | Votes | % |
|---|---|---|---|
| Democratic | Manny Gregory Castro | 5,178 | 52.89% |
| Independent | Edith E. DeLeon Guerrero (incumbent) | 4,210 | 43.00% |
| Independent | Luis Masga Sablan | 403 | 4.12% |
| Total votes | | 9,791 | 100.% |
| Democratic gain from Independent | | | |

=== House of Representatives ===
The Northern Mariana Islands House of Representatives is the lower house of the Northern Mariana Islands Commonwealth Legislature. The house has seven districts and five of the seven are Multi-member districts. The governing Democrat-Independent coalition is entering the 2024 election cycle with sixteen of twenty seats, an overwhelming majority over the minority bloc of three Republicans and one independent. All twenty seats were up for the 2024 elections.

==== By district ====
House of Representative - District 1: Saipan (6 seats)
| Party | Candidate | Votes | % |
|---|---|---|---|
| Democratic | Diego Vincent Fejeran Camacho (incumbent) | 1,834 | 11.94% |
| Independent | Raymond Ulloa Palacios | 1,817 | 11.83% |
| Independent | Joseph Arriola Flores (incumbent) | 1,660 | 10.80% |
| Independent | Roman Cepeda Benavente (incumbent) | 1,613 | 10.50% |
| Republican | Roy Christopher Aldan Ada (incumbent) | 1,591 | 10.36% |
| Independent | Vincent Raymond Seman Aldan (incumbent) | 1,549 | 10.08% |
| Independent | Janet Ulloa Maratita | 1,529 | 9.95% |
| Independent | Yvette Reyes Sablan | 1,339 | 8.72% |
| Republican | Benusto Piteg | 1,046 | 6.81% |
| Independent | Carmen Patricia Deleon Guerrero | 925 | 6.02% |
| Independent | Edwin Raymond Borja Quitugua | 461 | 3.00% |
| Total votes | | 15,364 | 100.00% |

House of Representative - District 2: Saipan (2 seats)
| Party | Candidate | Votes | % |
|---|---|---|---|
| Independent | John Paul Palacios Sablan (incumbent) | 700 | 41.89% |
| Independent | Daniel Jr. Iwashita Aquino | 559 | 33.45% |
| Independent | Diego Manglona Sablan | 412 | 24.66% |
| Total votes | | 1,671 | 100.00% |

House of Representative - District 3: Saipan (6 seats)
| Party | Candidate | Votes | % |
|---|---|---|---|
| Independent | Blas Jonathan "BJ" Tenorio Attao (incumbent) | 1,869 | 16.30% |
| Independent | Edmund Joseph Sablan Villagomez (incumbent) | 1,865 | 16.27% |
| Independent | Elias Jerome Malite Rangamar | 1,511 | 13.18% |
| Independent | Ralph Naraja Yumul (incumbent) | 1,466 | 12.79% |
| Independent | Marissa Renee Flores (incumbent) | 1,420 | 12.39% |
| Democratic | Denita Kaipat Yangetmai (incumbent) | 1,218 | 10.62% |
| Democratic | Vicente Castro Camacho (incumbent) | 1,218 | 10.28% |
| Independent | | 937 | 8.17% |
| Total votes | | 11.465 | 100.00% |

House of Representative - District 4: Saipan (2 seats)
| Party | Candidate | Votes | % |
|---|---|---|---|
| Independent | Joel Castro Camacho (incumbent) | 738 | 32.70% |
| Independent | Malcolm Omar (incumbent) | 582 | 25.79% |
| Independent | Cecilia Remedio Taitano Fitial | 400 | 17.72% |
| Republican | Antonio Suda Kapileo | 364 | 16.13% |
| Republican | Rosa Taman Rios | 173 | 7.67% |
| Total votes | | 2,257 | 100.00% |

House of Representative - District 5: Saipan (2 seats)
| Party | Candidate | Votes | % |
|---|---|---|---|
| Independent | Thomas John Dela Cruz Manglona (incumbent) | 1,344 | 42.50% |
| Independent | Angelo Atalig Camacho (incumbent) | 1,282 | 40.54% |
| Republican | Melvin Lawrence Odoshi Faisao | 536 | 16.54% |
| Total votes | | 3,162 | 100.00% |

House of Representative - District 6: Tinian (1 seat)
| Party | Candidate | Votes | % |
|---|---|---|---|
| Republican | Patrick Hofschneider San Nicolas (incumbent) | 763 | 100.00% |
| Total votes | | 763 | 100.00% |

House of Representative - District 7: Rota (1 seat)
| Party | Candidate | Votes | % |
|---|---|---|---|
| Independent | Julie Marie Atalig Ogo (incumbent) | 763 | 61.14% |
| Independent | Eusebio Mendiola Manglona | 485 | 38.86% |
| Total votes | | 1,248 | 100.00% |

== Municipal Council ==
Municipal Council - Saipan & Northern Islands (4D) (3 Seats, non-partisan)
| Party | Candidate | Votes | % |
|---|---|---|---|
| Nonpartisan | Marian Deleon Guerrero Tudela (incumbent) | 6,190 | 33.58% |
| Nonpartisan | Carmen Cabrera Pangelinan (incumbent) | 6,138 | 33.29% |
| Nonpartisan | Antonia Manibusan Tudela (incumbent) | 6,108 | 33.13% |
| Total votes | | 18,436 | 100.00% |

Municipal Council - Tinian & Aguiguan (3 Seats, non-partisan)
| Party | Candidate | Votes | % |
|---|---|---|---|
| Nonpartisan | Ana Marie Cruz San Nicolas (incumbent) | 737 | 34.23% |
| Nonpartisan | Joseph Romaldo Evangelista Santos (incumbent) | 711 | 33.02% |
| Nonpartisan | Estevan Pangelinan Cabrera (incumbent) | 705 | 32.75% |
| Total votes | | 2,153 | 100.00% |

Municipal Council - Rota (3 Seats, non-partisan)
| Party | Candidate | Votes | % |
|---|---|---|---|
| Nonpartisan | Jonovan Hocog Lizama (incumbent) | 950 | 29.61% |
| Nonpartisan | Sandra Mesngon Masga | 835 | 26.03% |
| Nonpartisan | Tillie Castro Taimanao | 823 | 25.65% |
| Nonpartisan | Jim Michael Atalig (incumbent) | 600 | 18.70% |
| Total votes | | 3,208 | 100.00% |

=== Board of education ===
Board of Education - Saipan & Northern Islands (4D) (2 seats, non-partisan)
| Party | Candidate | Votes | % |
|---|---|---|---|
| Nonpartisan | Aschumar Kodep Ogumoro-Uludong | 4,889 | 29.99% |
| Nonpartisan | Maisie Bermudes Tenorio (Incumbent) | 3,816 | 23.41% |
| Nonpartisan | Martin Borja Ada | 2,639 | 16.19% |
| Nonpartisan | Gregory Pat Borja (Incumbent) | 2,622 | 16.08% |
| Nonpartisan | Juan Iguel Tenorio | 2,335 | 14.32% |
| Total votes | | 16,301 | 100.00% |

Board of Education - Rota (non-partisan)
| Party | Candidate | Votes | % |
|---|---|---|---|
| Nonpartisan | Anthony Wayne Barcinas | 1,155 | 100.00% |
| Total votes | | 1,155 | 100.00% |

=== Judge ===
| Judge | For retention | | Against retention | | Total |
| Judge | Votes | % | Votes | % | Total |
|---|---|---|---|---|---|
| Theresa Kim Tenorio | 9,909 | 82.21% | 1,858 | 15.79% | 11,767 |
