= Angel Demapan =

Northern Mariana Islands politician

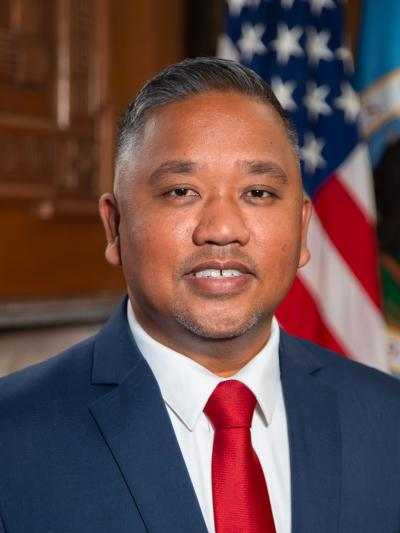
- Demapan in 2026

Minority Leader of the Northern Mariana Islands House of Representatives
- In office August 12, 2021 – January 9, 2023
- Preceded by: Ivan Blanco
- Succeeded by: Patrick H. San Nicolas

Personal details
- Born: Angel Aldan Demapan; May 27, 1982 (age 44) Saipan, Northern Mariana Islands, U.S.
- Party: Republican
- Spouse: TaAnn Kabua
- Education: Northern Marianas College; University of Hawaiʻi (BA)

Angel Aldan Demapan (born May 27, 1982 in Saipan, Northern Mariana Islands) is a Northern Mariana Islands politician affiliated with the Republican Party.

== Early life ==
Angel Aldan Demapan was born May 27, 1982, to Juan Deleon Guerrero Demapan, who served in the 4th Commonwealth Legislature, and Rosario Benavente Aldan. He served in the 1st through 3rd CNMI Youth Congresses and was speaker of the 2nd and 3rd CNMI Youth Congresses. He received an associate degree in business administration from Northern Marianas College and studied communications at the University of Hawaii at Manoa. He was a member of the 2nd and 3rd CNMI Youth Congresses. He served as press secretary for Governor Eloy Inos.

== First CNMI House tenure ==
Demapan served in the Northern Mariana Islands House of Representatives during the 19th and 20th Commonwealth Legislatures.

== 2018 United States House of Representatives election ==
On October 4, 2017, Demapan announced his candidacy for Delegate to the United States House of Representatives in the November 2018 election. He faced incumbent Delegate Gregorio "Killi" Sablan, an independent, in the forthcoming election on November 13, 2018, who won reelection by a wide margin. Between his loss in the 2018 election and his election to the CNMI House in 2020, he was chief of staff to Governor Ralph Torres.

== Second CNMI House tenure ==
In the 2020 general election, he was elected to the Northern Mariana Islands House of Representatives. At the start of the 22nd Commonwealth Legislature, Demapan was the Republican candidate for speaker of the house. After a stalemate between himself and Edmund Villagomez, Demapan bowed out after the third ballot in favor of fellow Republican Ivan Blanco. Villagomez was ultimately elected speaker. Demapan was also the Republican candidate for Floor Leader, losing to Villagomez-supporter Ralph N. Yumul. In August 2021, after the death of Minority Leader Ivan Blanco, Demapan was elected House Minority Leader by his fellow Republicans. In the 2022 general election, Demapan ran for an open seat in the Northern Mariana Islands Senate. He finished third of five candidates for the two open seats, losing to Democratic candidate Celina Babauta and Democratic-aligned independent candidate Corina Magofna. After the start of the 23rd Commonwealth Legislature, the predominantly-Republican minority chose Patrick Hofschneider San Nicolas to succeed Demapan as minority leader.

== Post-legislative career ==
In 2024, Demapan is an administrative services manager for the Nutrition Assistance Program. At the start of the 119th United States Congress, newly elected Delegate Kimberlyn King-Hinds named Demapan as her legislative director. In 2025, on the recommendation of Delegate King-Hinds, he was named Deputy Assistant Secretary for Insular & International Affairs in the United States Department of the Interior.

Northern Mariana Islands House of Representatives
Preceded by Ivan Blanco	Minority Leader of the Northern Mariana Islands House of Representatives; 2021–2023	Succeeded by Patrick San Nicolas
