= Elections in the Northern Mariana Islands =

The Commonwealth of the Northern Mariana Islands became a self-governing territory of the United States on November 4, 1986, with its own elected governor, lieutenant governor and legislature.

== Governor and lieutenant governor ==
The governor is elected for four-year term directly by the voters. If no candidate obtains an absolute majority of the votes, there must be a runoff election. A governor can be elected to two consecutive terms.

The candidate for lieutenant governor is on the same ticket as the candidate for governor, i.e. they are jointly elected (for the same four-year term).

Candidates for either office must be qualified to vote (see Voter eligibility section below), at least 35 years old, and must have lived in the territory for at least ten years immediately preceding the date of taking office. They cannot have been convicted of a felony in the Northern Mariana Islands or anywhere else under the jurisdiction of the United States, unless they have been fully pardoned.

== Legislature ==
The Northern Mariana Islands Commonwealth Legislature has two chambers. The House of Representatives has 20 members (18 prior to 2007), elected for a two-year term. The Senate has nine members, elected for a two-year term.

Senate candidates must be American citizens, at least 25 years old, and must have lived in the territory for at least five years immediately preceding the date of taking office. The same felony rules that apply to candidates for governor apply to senate candidates.

House candidates must be American citizens, at least 21 years old, and must have lived in the territory at least three years immediately preceding the date of taking office. They must be registered voters and living in the precinct they wish to represent. The same felony rules that apply to candidates for governor apply to house candidates.

== Voter eligibility ==
Voters must be American citizens, at least 18 years old on election day and must have lived in the territory for at least 120 days prior to the election. They cannot be barred from voting by court order or "serving a sentence including incarceration, parole, probation, or extended supervision for a felony conviction".

== Elections ==
- 1999 Northern Mariana Islands general election
- 2001 Northern Mariana Islands general election
- 2005 Northern Mariana Islands general election
- 2009 Northern Mariana Islands general election
- 2014 Northern Mariana Islands general election
- 2018 Northern Mariana Islands general election
- 2022 Northern Mariana Islands general election
- 2024 Northern Mariana Islands general election
- 2026 Northern Mariana Islands general election

== See also ==
- Political party strength in the Northern Mariana Islands
