= Celina Babauta =

Northern Mariana Islander politician

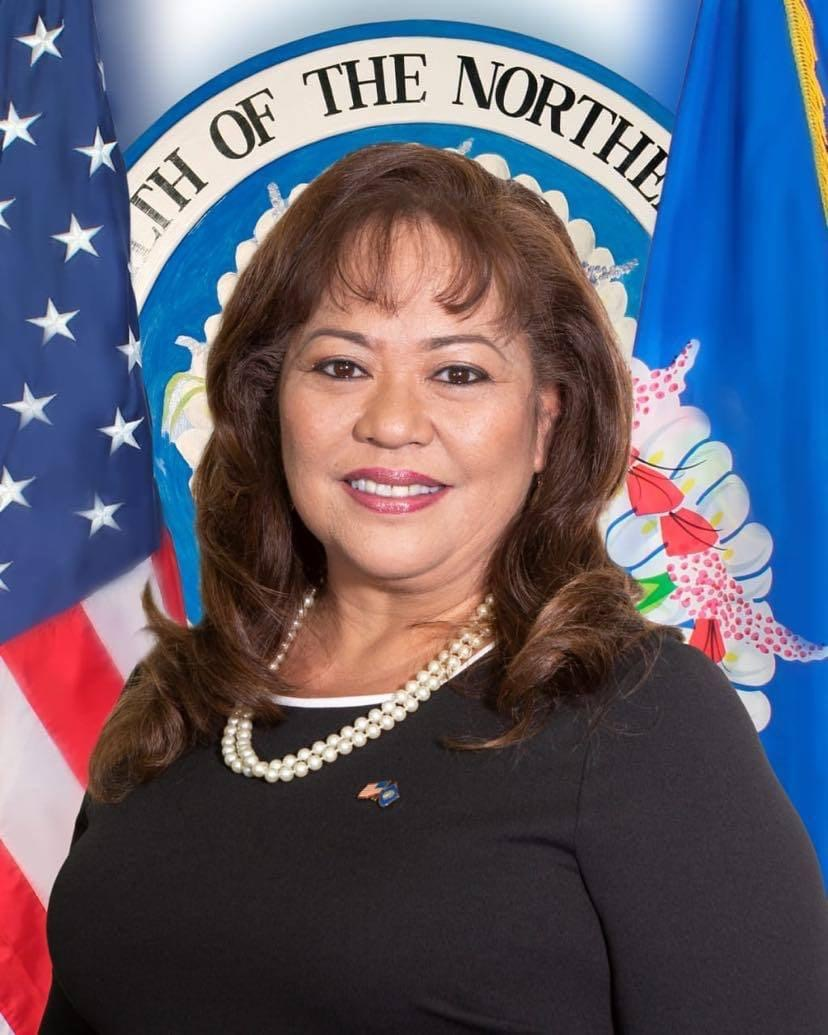
- Official portrait, 2021

Member of the Northern Mariana Islands Senate from the 3rd district
- Incumbent
- Assumed office January 9, 2023
- Preceded by: Justo Quitugua; Vinnie Sablan

Member of the Northern Mariana Islands House of Representatives from the 1st district
- In office January 2021 – January 9, 2023

Personal details
- Party: Democratic
- Spouse: Franklin Babauta
- Education: Chaminade University (BA)

Celina Roberto Babauta is a Northern Mariana Islander politician and incumbent Democratic member of the Northern Mariana Islands Senate representing the 3rd district. Babauta was sworn into office on January 9, 2023.

Prior to her service in the Northern Mariana Islands Senate, Babauta served in the Northern Mariana Islands House of Representatives during the 22nd Commonwealth Legislature.

== Early and personal life ==
Babauta has degrees in criminology and criminal justice and management from Chaminade University. She is a native of Chalan Kanoa. She is married to Lieutenant Colonel (ret.) Franklin Reyes Babauta, himself also a former CNMI legislator, with whom she has four children. She worked in banking in Saipan and Guam and as an executive assistant to governors Larry De Leon Guerrero, Froilan Tenorio, Pedro Tenorio, and Juan Babauta.

== House of Representatives ==
In the 2020 election, Babauta was elected to the Northern Mariana Islands House of Representatives from Precinct #1 as part of a resurgence of the Democratic Party that ended longtime Republican control of the Northern Mariana Islands House of Representatives. In the 22nd Commonwealth Legislature, Speaker Edmund Villagomez appointed Babauta the committee chairwoman of the Committee on Federal and Foreign Affairs. During her term, she became the House Judiciary and Governmental Operations Committee. As chair, she led the committee in its investigation into allegations of corruption by Governor Ralph Torres. Previously, as a private citizen, Babauta via open government requests, uncovered documents highlighting the corruption of the Torres administration.

== Senate ==
Babauta was elected to the Northern Mariana Islands Senate in the 2022 election. During the 23rd Commonwealth Legislature, she was a member of the INDEMS-majority and served as the Legislative Secretary. During the 24th Commonwealth Legislature, Babauta has been a political outlier with Troy Torres of KANDIT News describing her as the late Governor Arnold Palacios's sole ally in the Senate, while Emmanuel Erediano of Marianas Variety described her as a lone member of the minority voting bloc. Babauta, along with Representative Julie Ogo, was one of two members of the Commonwealth Legislature to voluntarily cut their pay during 2023-2024 government austerity measures.

On December 29, 2025, Babauta confirmed to Marianas Press that she is running for reelection to the Senate in 2026.
