= James Benjamin (politician) =

Northern Mariana Islander politician

Member-elect of the Northern Mariana Islands House of Representatives from the 4th district
- Assuming office January 2027
- Succeeding: Malcolm Omar

Personal details
- Party: Republican

James Benjamin is a Northern Mariana Islander politician. A member of the Republican Party, he is the member-elect for the 4th district of the Northern Mariana Islands House of Representatives.
