= Diego Camacho =

Diego Camacho may refer to:

- Diego Camacho y Ávila (1652–1712), Spanish archbishop
- Diego Camacho (footballer) (born 1976), Spanish footballer
- Diego Camacho (tennis) (born 1983), Bolivian tennis player
- Diego Vincent Fejeran Camacho, politician from the Northern Mariana Islands
