= Joseph R.E. Santos =

Northern Mariana Islander politician

Member-elect of the Northern Mariana Islands House of Representatives from the 6th district
- Assuming office January 2027
- Succeeding: Patrick H. San Nicolas

Personal details
- Party: Republican

Joseph R.E. Santos is a Northern Mariana Islander politician. A member of the Republican Party, he is the member-elect for the 6th district of the Northern Mariana Islands House of Representatives.
