= Alice Santos Igitol =

American politician

Alice Santos Igitol is a Republican territorial Representative of the Northern Mariana Islands.

Santos Igitol successfully stood for election to the House of Representatives for Precinct 4 in 2016. She became one of only two female House representatives. She serves as the chair of the House Committee on Natural Resources.
