= Janet Maratita =

Northern Mariana Islands politician

Janet Ulloa Maratita (born 1965 or 1966) is a politician from the Northern Mariana Islands and former member of the Northern Mariana Islands House of Representatives.

== Biography ==
Janet Ulloa Maratita was born in 1965/1966. In her professional life she has worked as a program manager for the Diabetes and Non-Communicable Disease Control of the Department of Public Health. Maratita has five children.

Maratita was elected to the Northern Mariana Islands House of Representatives for the 14th Commonwealth Legislature in 2005. In the 2007 general election, Maratita lost out in a close election to Tina Sablan. Maratita led a lawsuit against then-governor Benigno Fitial, later co-authoring one of the two resolutions passed by the House calling for his impeachment. She later claimed that Senator Juan Manglona Ayuyu had repeatedly threatened her life in a telephone conversation regarding the lawsuit.

She was appointed to the 17th Commonwealth Legislature after Diego Benavente retired. At the time an independent, she sat alongside Felicidad Ogumoro and Teresita Santos, marking the first time three women were simultaneously members of the body.

In the 2014 Northern Mariana Islands general election, Maritata ran for a seat in the Northern Mariana Islands Senate. She lost to Arnold Palacios.

She returned to serve in the House, being elected in 2016 and 2018. During her third house tenure, she was elected Vice-Speaker when positions were meted out. She chose not to seek reelection in the 2020 general election. In the 2022 general election, Maratita was one of the Republican nominees for two Senate seats representing Saipan in the Northern Mariana Islands Senate. Maratita finished fourth of five candidates, losing to Democratic candidate Celina Roberto Babauta and independent candidate Corina Magofna.
