= Manny Castro =

Northern Mariana Islander politician

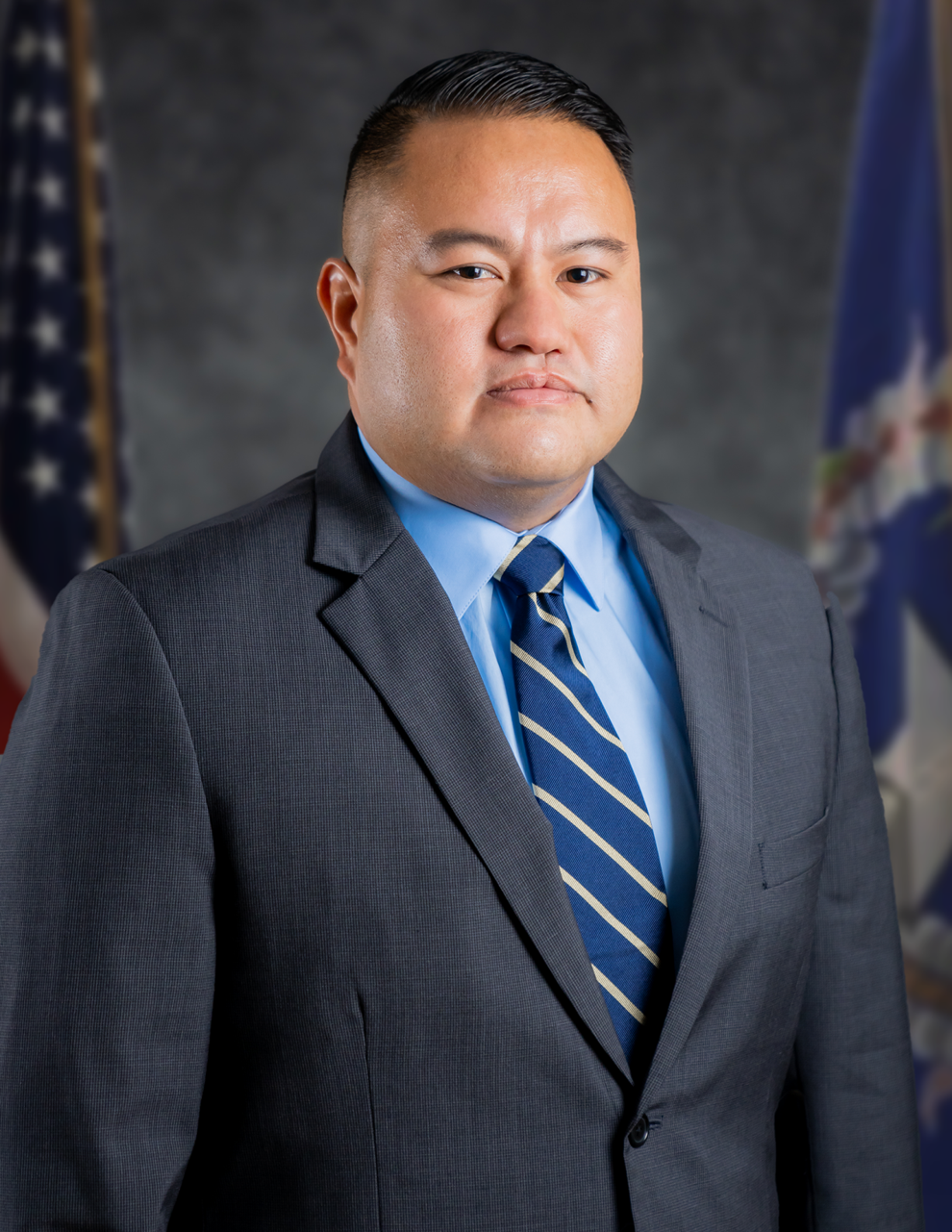
- Official portrait, 2023

Member of the Northern Mariana Islands Senate from the 3rd district
- Incumbent
- Assumed office January 13, 2025
- Preceded by: Edith DeLeon Guerrero

Member of the Northern Mariana Islands House of Representatives from the 2nd district
- In office January 9, 2023 – January 13, 2025
- Preceded by: Tina Sablan
- Succeeded by: Daniel I. Aquino

Personal details
- Born: Saipan
- Party: Republican (since 2026); Democratic (2024-2026); Independent (before 2024)
- Spouse: Kelsey Lizama
- Children: 2
- Education: Eastern Oregon University

Manny Gregory Tenorio Castro is a Northern Mariana Islander politician and Senator for the 3rd district. He was a member for the 2nd district of the Northern Mariana Islands House of Representatives.

== Early life and career ==
Manny Gregory Tenorio Castro was raised in Fina Sisu, a village in Saipan, before going to high school in Oregon. Castro earned his bachelor’s and master’s degrees in Business Administration from Eastern Oregon University. He returned to the Northern Mariana Islands to work at Northern Marianas College. He rose to become the director of enrollment services.

== House of Representatives ==
In 2022, Precinct 2 incumbent Tina Sablan announced she would forgo reelection to run for governor. Castro ran for the opening. Castro and his running mate, incumbent John Paul Sablan, were elected to represent Precinct #2. He was appointed the chairman of the House Education Committee for the 23rd Commonwealth Legislature. While a member of the House, Castro was appointed to the Western Interstate Commission for Higher Education’s Legislative Advisory Committee.

== Senate ==
In the 2024 general election, Castro was the Democratic nominee for the third district of the Northern Mariana Islands Senate against independent candidate and incumbent Senate President Edith DeLeon Guerrero. Castro defeated DeLeon Guerrero receiving 5,178 votes to Deleon Guerrero's 4,210 votes. He was succeeded in Precinct 2 by Daniel Iwashita Aquino Jr, the former head of the Commonwealth Bureau of Military Affairs, who was elected alongside incumbent Paul Sablan.

In July 2025, Castro proposed an amendment to substantially reduce the size of the Commonwealth Legislature, reducing the Senate to six members and the House to thirteen members. In June 2026, Castro joined the Republican Party and endorsed their ticket for governor and lieutenant governor in the 2026 gubernatorial election.
