= Elias Rangamar =

Northern Mariana Islander politician

Member of the Northern Mariana Islands House of Representatives from the 3rd district
- Incumbent
- Assumed office January 13, 2025
- Preceded by: Vicente Castro Camacho

Personal details
- Party: Independent

Elias Rangamar is a Northern Mariana Islander politician. An independent, he has served in the Northern Mariana Islands House of Representatives since 2025, representing the 3rd district.
