= Raymond Palacios =

Northern Mariana Islander politician

Member of the Northern Mariana Islands House of Representatives from the 1st district
- Incumbent
- Assumed office January 13, 2025
- Preceded by: Ed Propst

Personal details
- Party: Independent

Raymond Palacios is a Northern Mariana Islander politician. An independent, he has served in the Northern Mariana Islands House of Representatives since 2025, representing the 1st district.
