= Joel C. Camacho =

Northern Mariana Islander politician

Joel Camacho

Vice Speaker of the Northern Mariana Islands House of Representatives
- In office January 9, 2023 – January 13, 2025
- Preceded by: Blas T. Attao
- Succeeded by: Diego Camacho

Member of the Northern Mariana Islands House of Representatives from the 4th district
- Incumbent
- Assumed office January 14, 2019
- Preceded by: Vinnie Sablan; Alice Santos Igitol

Personal details
- Political party: Independent
- Education: Boise State University (BA)

Joel Castro Camacho is a Northern Mariana Islander politician. He serves as an Independent member for the 4th district of the Northern Mariana Islands House of Representatives. On November 7th, 2025, Camacho announced his candidacy for Mayor of Saipan in the 2026 general election.

Northern Mariana Islands House of Representatives
Preceded by Blas T. Attao	Vice Speaker of Northern Mariana Islands Senate; 2023–2025	Succeeded by Diego Camacho
