= Leila Staffler =

American politician and educator

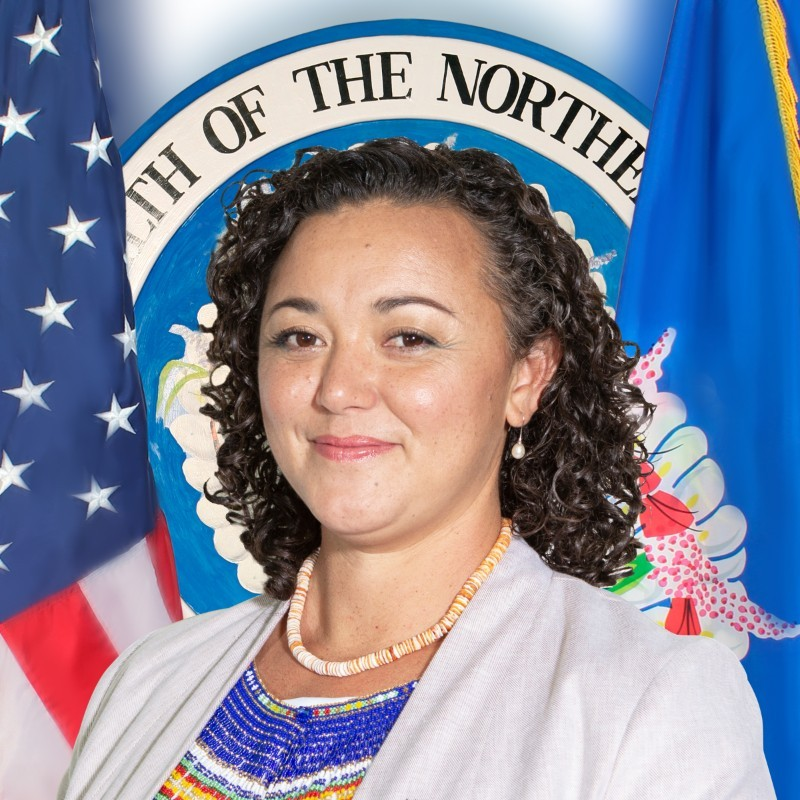
- Staffler during the 22nd CNMI Legislature

Secretary of Labor of the Northern Mariana Islands
- Incumbent
- Assumed office March 29, 2023
- Preceded by: Vicky Benavente

Personal details
- Party: Democratic
- Education: Willamette University (BA); Western Governors University (MS)

Leila Haveia Fleming Clark Staffler is an American politician and educator who serves as the Secretary of Labor in the administration of Governor Arnold Palacios. She was confirmed on March 29, 2023, by the Northern Mariana Islands Senate. Prior to her cabinet position, she was a member of the Northern Mariana Islands House of Representatives for the 5th district.

== Education ==
Staffler earned a Bachelor of Arts degree in liberal arts from Willamette University in 2001 and a Master of Science in educational leadership and administration from Western Governors University.

== Career ==
From 2001 to 2007, Staffler worked as an art and English teacher at Tinian Jr./Sr. High School. From 2007 to 2010, she was an English teacher at Kagman High School in Saipan. She later worked as the principal of Kagman High School from 2013 to 2021. Staffler was elected to the Northern Mariana Islands House of Representatives in November 2020 and assumed office on January 11, 2021.

She was the Democratic nominee for lieutenant governor of the Northern Mariana Islands in the 2022 gubernatorial election. Staffler and her running mate Tina Sablan finished in third place in the election, after which they endorsed the Independent ticket of Arnold Palacios and David Apatang. After Palacios won the runoff election, he selected Staffler as his Secretary of Labor. She was confirmed on March 29, 2023, by the Northern Mariana Islands Senate.

In 2025, after Tina Sablan moved off-island, Staffler was named the DNC National Committeewoman from the Northern Mariana Islands. Later that year, after considering a run for the Northern Mariana Islands Senate to represent Saipan, Staffler has announced she will seek election to the CNMI House from Precinct 5 in the 2026 general election.
