= Vicente Castro Camacho =

Northern Mariana Islander politician (born 1961)

Vicente C. Camacho
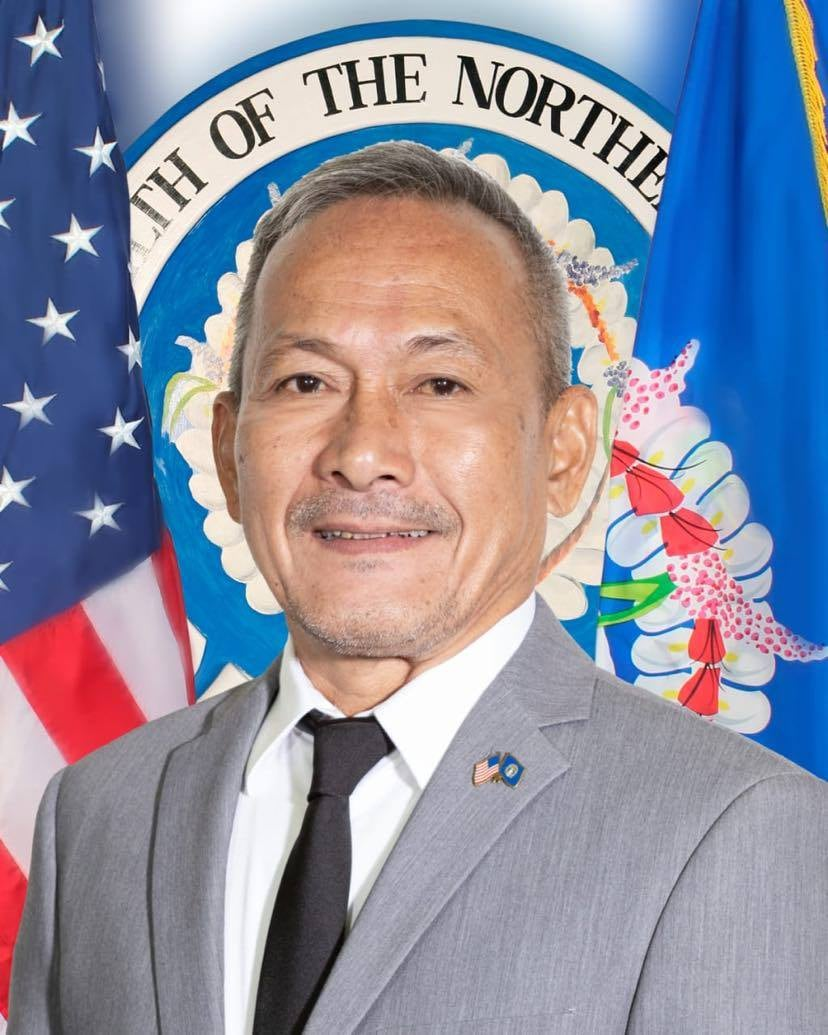

Member of the Northern Mariana Islands House of Representatives from the 3rd district
- In office January 11, 2021 – January 13, 2025
- Preceded by: Jose Ilo Itibus
- Succeeded by: Elias Rangamar

Personal details
- Born: February 1961 (age 65) Saipan
- Party: Democratic
- Spouse: Isabella Hosei
- Children: Eight
- Education: Central Texas College
- Profession: Soldier (retired); Politician

Military service
- Allegiance: United States
- Branch/service: United States Army
- Years of service: 1983-2007
- Rank: Sergeant First Class

Vicente Castro Camacho is a politician and retired United States Army soldier from the Northern Mariana Islands. He served two terms in the Northern Mariana Islands House of Representatives.

== Early and personal life ==
Vicente Castro Camacho was born in February 1961. He was raised in Saipan by his parents Isidro Salas Camacho of Gualo Rai and Maria Babauta Castro of San Roque. Camacho is a 5th Dan Black Belt in Taekwondo and is the owner-operator of the Camacho Taekwondo Center. He is married to Isabella Hosei, and has eight children, and a number of grandchildren.

== Military career ==
Camacho enlisted in the United States Army in May 1983 at the age of 22. He received training as a paratrooper and his Military Occupational Specialty was administration. He served with the 82nd Airborne Division at Fort Bragg, and was later assigned to the United States European Command, and to United States Forces Korea. While in the military, he earned an associates degree in general studies from Central Texas College. He retired from the Army as a Sergeant First Class in 2007. His final assignment was with the Assistant Secretary of Defense for Special Operations and Low-Intensity Conflict as an administrative supervisor & security manager. He continued with the United States government in civilian roles with the US Secretary of Defense, the United States Navy, and the General Services Administration.

== Political career ==
He returned to the Northern Mariana Islands in July 2011. A few months after his return, he was appointed the head of the Military and Veterans Affairs Office.

He was an unsuccessful candidate, running as an independent, for the Northern Mariana Islands House of Representatives in the 2016 and 2018 general elections. In 2020, he was elected to the House as a Democrat as part of a resurgence in the Democratic Party.

At the start of the 22nd Commonwealth Legislature, he was named the chairman of the Committee on Federal and Foreign Affairs. In the 23rd Commonwealth Legislature, he continued to serve as chairman of the Committee on Federal and Foreign Affairs. His additional committee assignments included the committees on Commerce & Tourism; Judiciary & Governmental Operations; and Ways & Means. He was an unsuccessful candidate for reelection in 2024 finishing seventh of eight candidates for six seats behind the other incumbent lawmakers and first time candidate Elias Jerome Malite Rangamar.

In January 2026, Camacho informed Marianas Press of his intention to run as an independent for the Northern Mariana Islands Senate in the 2026 general election.
