= Thomas Manglona =

Northern Mariana Islander politician

Member of the Northern Mariana Islands House of Representatives from the 5th district
- Incumbent
- Assumed office January 3, 2023

Personal details
- Party: Republican (2023–2024); Independent (2025–)

Thomas John Dela Cruz Manglona is a Northern Mariana Islander politician. He served as a Republican member for the 5th district of the Northern Mariana Islands House of Representatives from 2023 to 2024. He won reelection in 2024 as an independent.
