= Julie Ogo =

Northern Mariana Islander politician

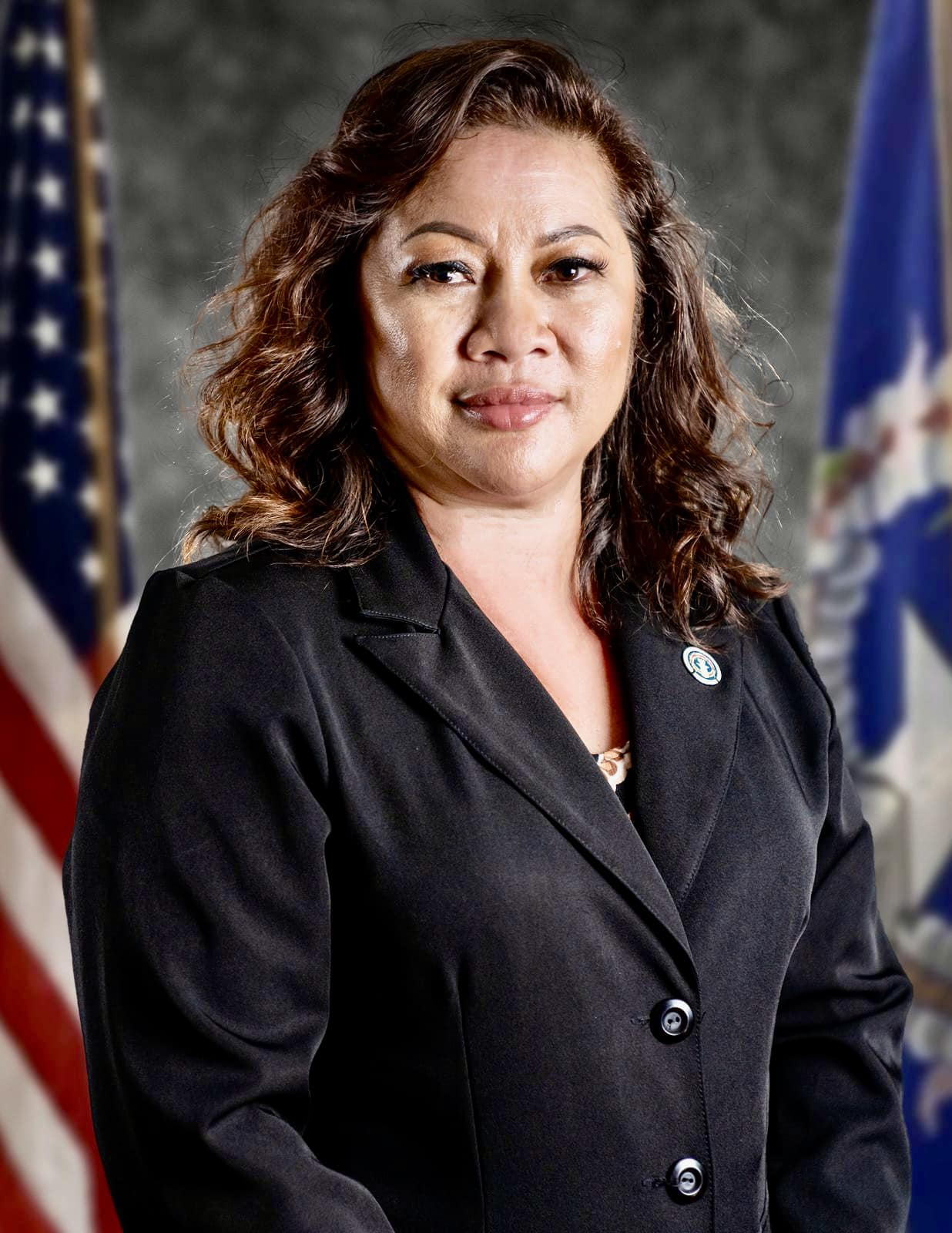

Member of the Northern Mariana Islands House of Representatives from the 7th district
- Incumbent
- Assumed office January 9, 2023
- Preceded by: Donald M. Manglona

Personal details
- Born: December 14
- Political party: Independent

Julie Marie Atalig Ogo is a politician from the Northern Mariana Islands. She serves as an independent member of the Northern Mariana Islands House of Representatives representing the 7th district, which consists of Rota. In the 2022 general election, Ogo defeated Ivan Mereb and Edward Castro Barcinas to succeed Donald M. Manglona, who vacated the seat to run for the Northern Mariana Islands Senate. In the 23rd Commonwealth Legislature, she was named by Speaker Edmund Villagomez to serve as chairwoman of the Committee on Commerce and Tourism. In the 2024 general election, Ogo defeated Eusebio Mendiola Manglona to win reelection.
