= Patrick H. San Nicolas =

Northern Mariana Islander politician

Patrick San Nicolas
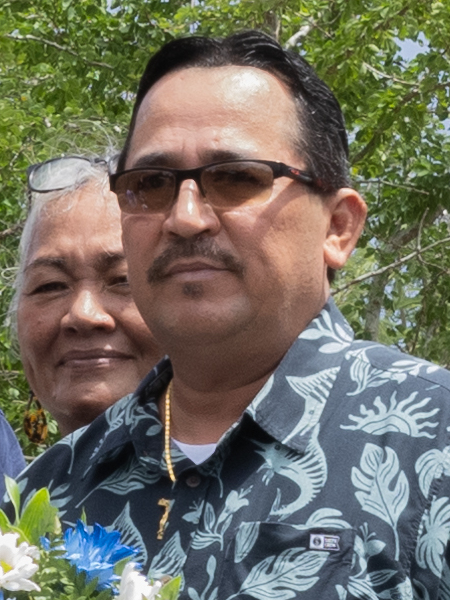
- San Nicolas at a Battle of Tinian remembrance event (2024)

Minority Leader of the Northern Mariana Islands House of Representatives
- In office January 13, 2023 – February 19, 2025
- Preceded by: Angel Demapan
- Succeeded by: Roy Ada

Member of the Northern Mariana Islands House of Representatives from the 6th district
- Incumbent
- Assumed office January 11, 2021
- Preceded by: Antonio S.N. Borja
- Succeeded by: Joseph R.E. Santos (elect)

Personal details
- Born: Patrick Hofschneider San Nicolas
- Party: Republican

Patrick Hofschneider San Nicolas is a Northern Mariana Islander politician. He serves as a Republican member for the 6th district of the Northern Mariana Islands House of Representatives. He was a police officer at the Department of Public Safety and as an investigator, then commissioner at the Tinian Casino Gaming Control Commission. In the 23rd Commonwealth Legislature, he was selected to be the minority leader. For the 24th Commonwealth Legislature, San Nicolas and the other members of the minority bloc informed Speaker Villagomez that they named Roy Ada as the new minority leader.

After incumbent mayor Edwin P. Aldan announced his retirement, San Nicolas announced his campaign to serve as mayor of Tinian. He ran against his predecessor as Precinct #6 representative, Antonio San Nicolas Borja, in the Republican primary on April 11, 2026. Borja won with an overwhelming 543 votes to San Nicolas' 180 votes.

Northern Mariana Islands House of Representatives
Preceded by Angel Demapan	Minority Leader of the Northern Mariana Islands House of Representatives; 2023–2025	Succeeded by Roy Ada
