= Daniel I. Aquino =

Northern Mariana Islander politician

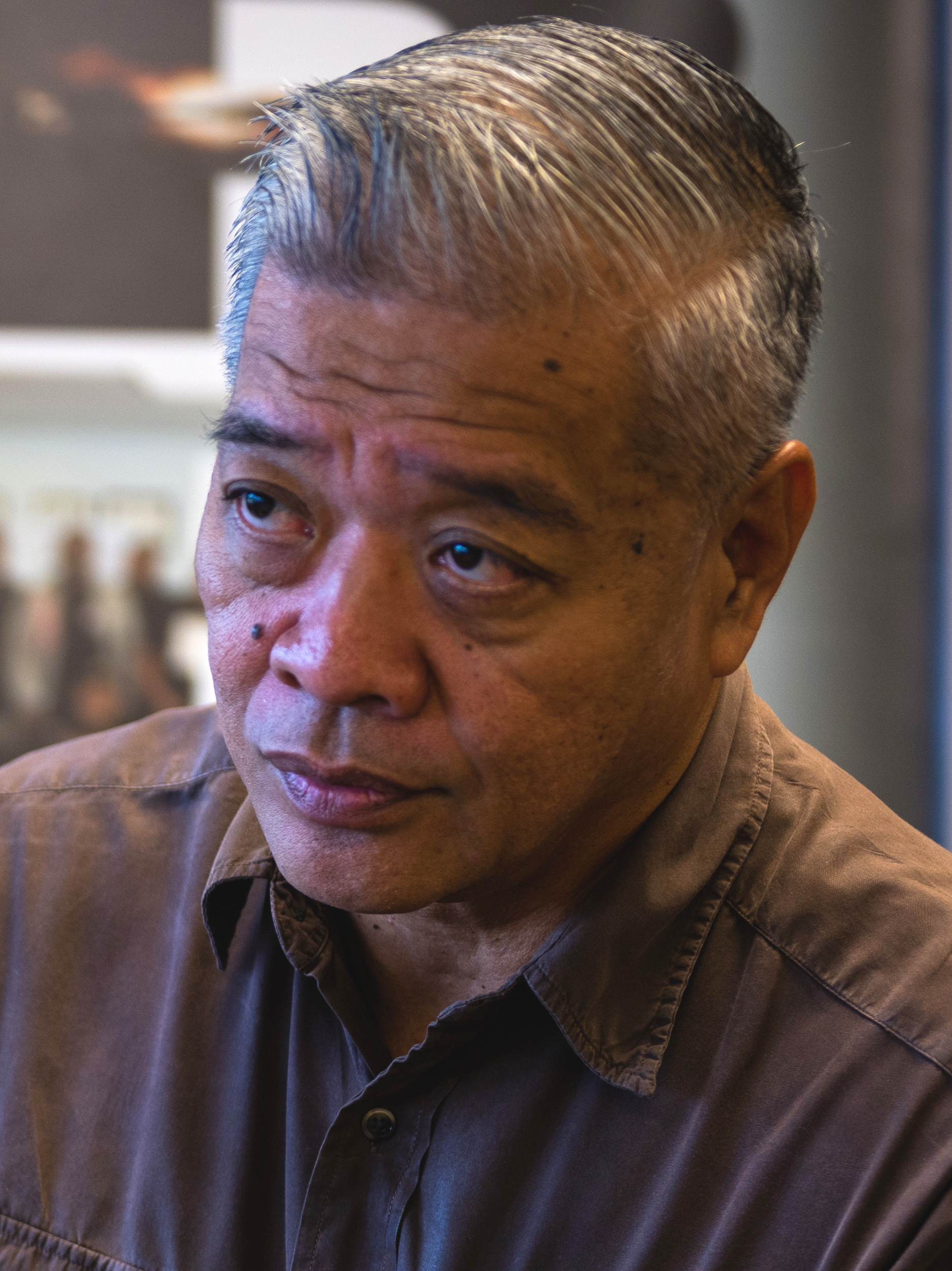

Member of the Northern Mariana Islands House of Representatives from the 2nd district
- Incumbent
- Assumed office January 13, 2025
- Preceded by: Manny Castro

Personal details
- Party: Independent

Daniel Iwashita Aquino Jr. is a Northern Mariana Islander politician. He serves as an Independent member for the 2nd district of the Northern Mariana Islands House of Representatives. He was previously the head of the Commonwealth Bureau of Military Affairs. In February 2025, the five-member minority bloc informed Speaker Villagomez that they named Aquino as an assistant minority leader.

In 2021, Aquino was appointed to the 16th Saipan and Northern Islands Municipal Council. He had the support of former governor Benigno Fitial and then-mayor of Saipan David Apatang. Aquino served on this body until he was elected to the legislature. He has a bachelor of science in business management from the University of Guam and served in the United States Army Corps of Engineers.
