= Ed Propst =

American politician (born 1972)

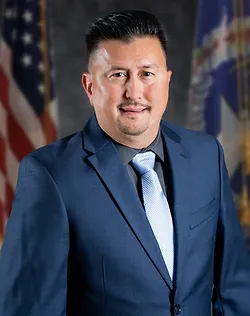

Floor Leader of Northern Mariana Islands House of Representatives
- In office January 9, 2023 – January 13, 2025
- Preceded by: Ralph Yumul
- Succeeded by: Marissa Flores

Member of the Northern Mariana Islands House of Representatives from the 1st district
- In office January 12, 2015 – January 13, 2025
- Succeeded by: Raymond Palacios

Personal details
- Born: Edwin Kenneth Propst; February 14, 1971 (age 55) Samoa
- Party: Independent (before 2020); Democratic (since 2020)
- Spouse: Daisy Manglona
- Children: 4
- Education: Northern Marianas College; University of Hawaii, Manoa (BA)

Edwin Kenneth Propst (born February 14, 1971) is a politician from the Northern Mariana Islands. Propst served in the Northern Mariana Islands House of Representatives representing Precinct 1 from January 12, 2015 to January 13, 2025.

== Early life and career ==
Edwin Kenneth Propst was born in Samoa on February 14, 1971. to Ivan, an employee of the Trust Territory Department of Education from Illinois, and Juanita Palman, who was from the Philippines. Propst is the youngest of four children. Propst is married to Daisy Pangelinan Manglona and has four children. They live in Dandan, Saipan.

He attended Northern Marianas College and University of Hawaiʻi at Mānoa, earning a bachelor's degree in communications at the latter. He also attended Sophia University for a time. He has worked as a high school English teacher and at Northern Marianas College as an administrator. From 2009 to 2014, he managed the Head Start program within the Northern Marianas public school system. He also owns a photography business. He was the publisher of MP Magazine for a time.

== CNMI Legislature ==
He previously served as minority leader from December 2018 until a coalition of Democrats and independents won a majority in the 2020 general election. Propst is a member of the House Education, Federal & Foreign Affairs, Judiciary & Governmental Operations, and Ways & Means committees and the chair of the Gaming Committee.

In December 2021, Propst was the subject of allegations of physical threats, made by a senior policy advisor from the office of the Governor. The complaint was forwarded to the House of Representatives' ethics committee.

At the start of the 23rd Commonwealth Legislature, on January 9, 2023, Representative Ralph Naraja Yumul, floor leader during the 22nd Commonwealth Legislature, nominated Propst to serve as the Floor Leader in the House. The House voted by acclimation to elect Propst to the position. Marissa Flores assumed the position of Floor Leader of the House of Representatives for the 24th Commonwealth Legislature.

In 2024, Propst ran to be the Northern Marianas Islands' non-voting delegate to the US House of Representatives. He received the Democratic nomination, but was defeated in the general election by Kimberlyn King-Hinds.

== Post-legislative career ==
In 2025, Propst was hired as a program manager at the CNMI Broadband Policy & Development Office.

== Electoral history ==
=== 2014 ===
In the 2014 election, Propst joined a slate led by the gubernatorial ticket of Heinz Hofschneider and Ray Naraja Yumul. On election day, Propst finished second of seventeen candidates for six seats.

=== 2016 ===
Propst was the top voter getting finishing first of eleven candidates for six seats. He received 2,024 votes.

=== 2018 ===
In 2018, Propst was reelected to the House finishing first of thirteen candidates for six seats.

=== 2020 ===
In June 2020, Propst, and fellow incumbents Tina Sablan, Sheila Babauta, and Richard Lizama announced that they would run on the Democratic slate for reelection. In September 2020, Propst was accused of sexual misconduct, stemming from allegations dating back to his time spent working as a teacher. He announced his resignation from office later that month, stating that "this job can be extremely stressful and the attacks and cyber bullying seem to only worsen with each passing day. It can break a person down mentally, emotionally, and physically. Everyone has their limits and I feel I have reached mine." However, he was re-elected later that fall, with 1,891 votes, as the top vote getter in the 1st district.

After the election, the Attorney General announced it would not pursue prosecution due to "insufficient factual information and legal justification for pursuing a criminal prosecution."

=== 2022 ===
Propst was the top vote getter in the 1st district, earning 2,296 votes.

=== 2024 ===
Incumbent Delegate to the U.S. House of Representatives Gregorio Sablan decided to retire rather than seek re-election to a ninth term in office. On February 8, 2024, Propst announced his candidacy and was endorsed by Sablan to be his successor. The campaign was chaired by former Representative and 2022 Democratic gubernatorial nominee Tina Sablan and managed by Representative Ralph N. Yumul. Propst finished second in the five-way race, earning 4,067 votes to Delegate-elect Kimberlyn King-Hinds's 4,931 votes.

Northern Mariana Islands House of Representatives
Preceded by Ralph Yumul	Majority Leader of Northern Mariana Islands House of Representatives; 2023–2025	Succeeded by Marissa Flores
