= Angelo Camacho =

Northern Mariana Islander politician

Member of the Northern Mariana Islands House of Representatives from the 5th district
- Incumbent
- Assumed office January 9, 2023

Personal details
- Political party: Independent

Angelo Atalig Camacho is a Northern Mariana Islander politician. He serves as an Independent member for the 5th district of the Northern Mariana Islands House of Representatives.
