= John Paul P. Sablan =

Northern Mariana Islander politician

Member of the Northern Mariana Islands House of Representatives from the 2nd district
- Incumbent
- Assumed office January 2013

Personal details
- Party: Independent

John Paul “Pacho” Palacios Sablan is a Northern Mariana Islander politician who serves an Independent member for the 2nd district of the Northern Mariana Islands House of Representatives.

Sablan was first elected in the 2012 election as a member of the Covenant Party. He is serving his second term as the Chair of the Saipan and Northern Islands delegation.
