= Joseph A. Flores =

Northern Mariana Islander politician

Member of the Northern Mariana Islands House of Representatives from the 1st district
- Incumbent
- Assumed office January 14, 2019

Personal details
- Political party: Independent

Joseph Arriola Flores is a Northern Mariana Islander politician. He serves as an Independent member for the 1st district of the Northern Mariana Islands House of Representatives.
