= Roman C. Benavente =

Northern Mariana Islander politician

Member of the Northern Mariana Islands House of Representatives from the 1st district
- Incumbent
- Assumed office January 9, 2023

Personal details
- Political party: Independent

Roman Cepeda Benavente is a Northern Mariana Islander politician who serves an Independent member for the 1st district of the Northern Mariana Islands House of Representatives. Benavente, most recently elected as a non-incumbent in 2019, previously served in the Northern Mariana Islands House of Representatives from 2013 to 2017 and as a member of the Board of Education from 2000 to 2002 and again from 2004 to 2008.
