= Vincent Seman Aldan =

Northern Mariana Islander politician

Member of the Northern Mariana Islands House of Representatives from the 1st district
- Incumbent
- Assumed office January 9, 2023

Personal details
- Born: 1971 or 1972 (age 53–54)
- Party: Independent

Vincent "Kobre" Raymond Seman Aldan Northern Mariana Islander politician. He serves as an Independent member for the 1st district of the Northern Mariana Islands House of Representatives.

Aldan is a veteran of the United States Navy.
