= Marissa Flores =

Northern Mariana Islander politician

Floor Leader of Northern Mariana Islands House of Representatives
- Incumbent
- Assumed office January 13, 2025
- Preceded by: Ed Propst

Member of the Northern Mariana Islands House of Representatives from the 3rd district
- Incumbent
- Assumed office January 9, 2023
- Preceded by: Corina Magofna

Personal details
- Political party: Independent

Marissa Renee Flores is a Northern Mariana Islander politician who serves as an Independent member for the 3rd district of the Northern Mariana Islands House of Representatives.

On January 8, 2025, it was announced that Flores would be elected to the position of Floor Leader of the House of Representatives for the 24th Commonwealth Legislature.

Northern Mariana Islands House of Representatives
Preceded by Ed Propst	Majority Leader of Northern Mariana Islands House of Representatives; 2025–present	Incumbent
