= Denita Yangetmai =

Northern Mariana Islander politician

Member of the Northern Mariana Islands House of Representatives from the 3rd district
- Incumbent
- Assumed office January 11, 2021

Personal details
- Political party: Democratic

Denita Piafur Kaipat Yangetmai is a Northern Mariana Islander politician. She serves as a Democratic member for the 3rd district of the Northern Mariana Islands House of Representatives.
