= Vinnie Sablan =

Northern Mariana Islands politician

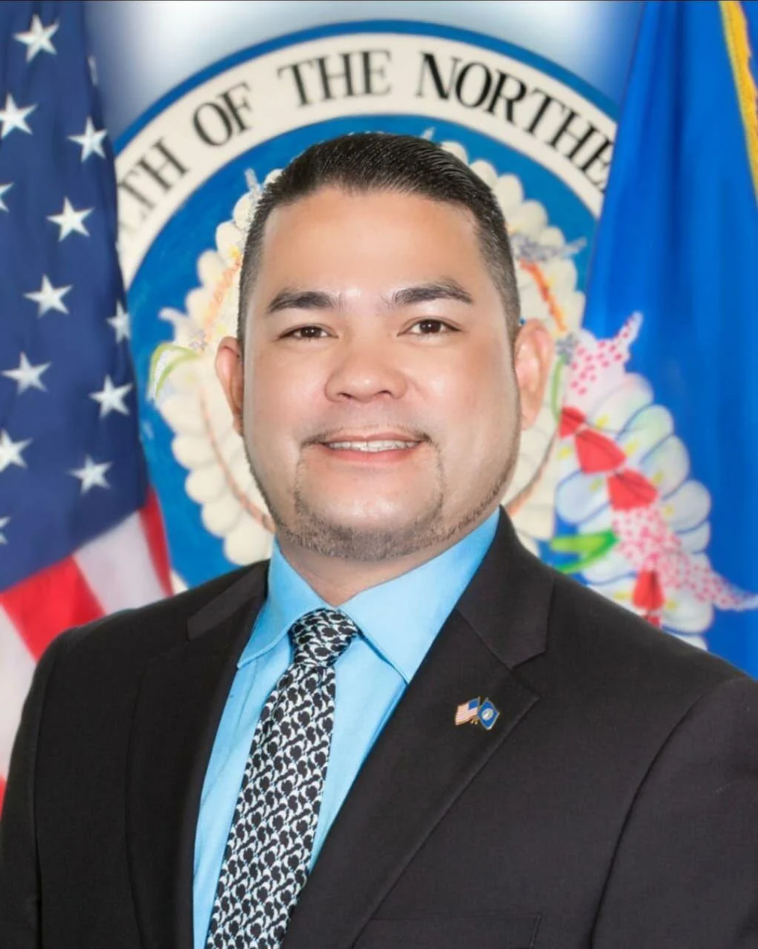
- Sablan in 2021

Floor Leader of the Northern Mariana Islands Senate
- In office January 11, 2021 – January 9, 2023
- Preceded by: Justo Songao Quitugua
- Succeeded by: Corina Magofna

Personal details
- Born: August 31, 1978 (age 48)
- Party: Independent (before 2021); Republican (2021–present)
- Education: Northern Marianas College; University of Phoenix (BS)

Vinson Edward Flores "Vinnie" Sablan is a Northern Marianan politician who served as a member of the Northern Mariana Islands Senate from the 3rd district. He is a member of the Republican Party.

== Early life and career ==
Sablan was born August 31, 1978. Sablan has associate degree in computer applications and business administration from Northern Marianas College and a bachelor's degree in management from University of Phoenix. Sablan was a Bureau of Environmental and Coastal Quality laboratory manager at the time of his first election.

== Political career ==
Sablan was first elected to public office in 2014, when he won one of two seats to represent the 4th district in the Northern Mariana Islands House of Representatives. He was elected to the Northern Mariana Islands Senate in the 2018 general election alongside Justo Songao Quitugua. In January 2021, at the start of the 22nd Commonwealth Legislature, Sablan was elected Floor Leader of the Senate to succeed Justo Songao Quitugua. Later that month, he was unanimously elected the chairman of the 22nd Saipan and Northern Islands Legislative Delegation. He was an independent aligned with the Republican-led majority until joining the Republican Party in July 2021. Sablan was a candidate for lieutenant governor of the Northern Mariana Islands in the 2022 gubernatorial election.

As of November 2025, he is the chief of staff to Lieutenant Governor Dennis Mendiola.

In November 2025, he announced his candidacy for the Republican nomination to run for governor in 2026. He withdrew from the Republican primary on February 26, 2026, in order to run for the Northern Mariana Islands Senate.

Northern Mariana Islands Senate
Preceded by Justo Songao Quitugua	Majority Leader of the Northern Mariana Islands Senate; 2021–2023	Succeeded by Corina Magofna
