= Malcolm Omar =

Northern Mariana Islander politician

Member of the Northern Mariana Islands House of Representatives from the 4th district
- Incumbent
- Assumed office January 9, 2023
- Succeeded by: James Benjamin (elect)

Personal details
- Party: Independent

Malcolm Jason Omar is a Northern Mariana Islander politician. He serves as an Independent member for the 4th district of the Northern Mariana Islands House of Representatives.
