= Roy Ada =

Northern Mariana Islander politician

Minority Leader of the Northern Mariana Islands House of Representatives
- Incumbent
- Assumed office February 19, 2025
- Preceded by: Patrick H. San Nicolas

Member of the Northern Mariana Islands House of Representatives from the 1st district
- Incumbent
- Assumed office January 11, 2021

Personal details
- Born: Roy Christopher Aldan Ada
- Political party: Republican

Roy Christopher Aldan Ada is a Northern Mariana Islander politician. He serves as a Republican member for the 1st district of the Northern Mariana Islands House of Representatives.

== Political career ==
Ada was elected District 1 representative in 2020 and was one of five Republicans in the legislature at the time. While in office, he has been the dissenting vote on a variety of legislation, including infrastructure bills and the impeachment of Governor Ralph Torres. In August 2024, Ada announced he would run for a third term. At the beginning of the 24th Commonwealth Legislature, Ada was named the new House Minority Leader after Patrick H. San Nicolas stepped down from the position.

Northern Mariana Islands House of Representatives
Preceded by Patrick H. San Nicolas	Majority Leader of the Northern Mariana Islands House of Representatives; 2025–present	Incumbent
