= Diego Camacho (politician) =

Northern Mariana Islander politician

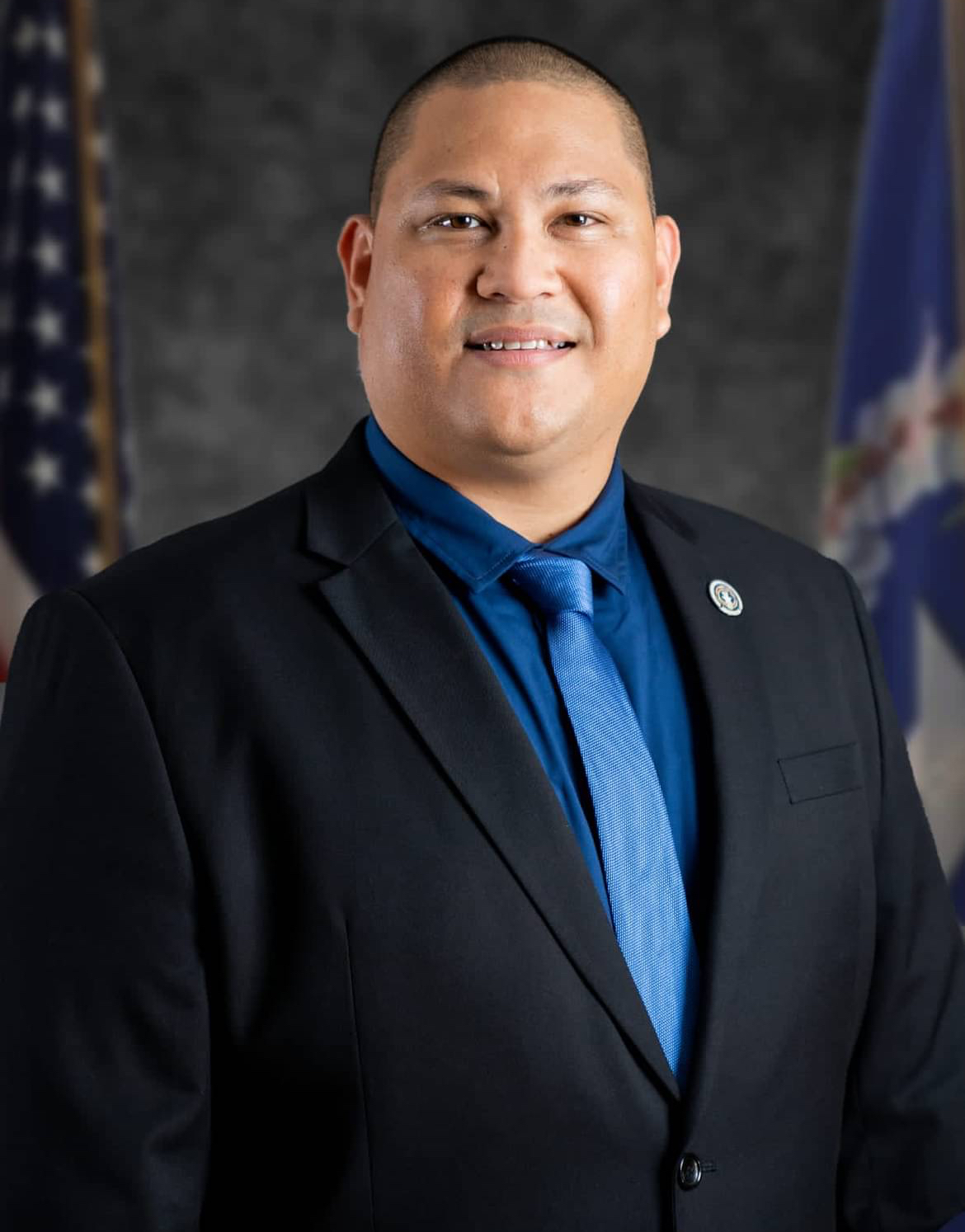
- Camacho in 2023

Vice Speaker of the Northern Mariana Islands House of Representatives
- Incumbent
- Assumed office January 13, 2025
- Preceded by: Joel C. Camacho

Member of the Northern Mariana Islands House of Representatives from the 1st district
- Incumbent
- Assumed office January 9, 2023

Personal details
- Born: Diego Vincent Fejeran Camacho
- Party: Democratic
- Education: Northern Marianas College (attended)

Diego Vincent Fejeran Camacho is a Northern Mariana Islander politician. He serves as a Democratic member for the 1st district of the Northern Mariana Islands House of Representatives. Prior to his time in the legislature, he was the head of CNMI's Head Start program and served as Chief of Staff to Ed Propst.

In the 23rd Commonwealth Legislature, Camacho was appointed Chairman of the House Committee on Medical Cannabis. On January 8, 2025, it was announced that Camacho would be elected to the position of Vice Speaker of the House of Representatives for the 24th Commonwealth Legislature.

Northern Mariana Islands House of Representatives
Preceded by Joel C. Camacho	Vice Speaker of Northern Mariana Islands House of Representatives; 2025–present	Incumbent
