= Edmund Villagomez =

Northern Mariana Islands politician

Ed Villagomez
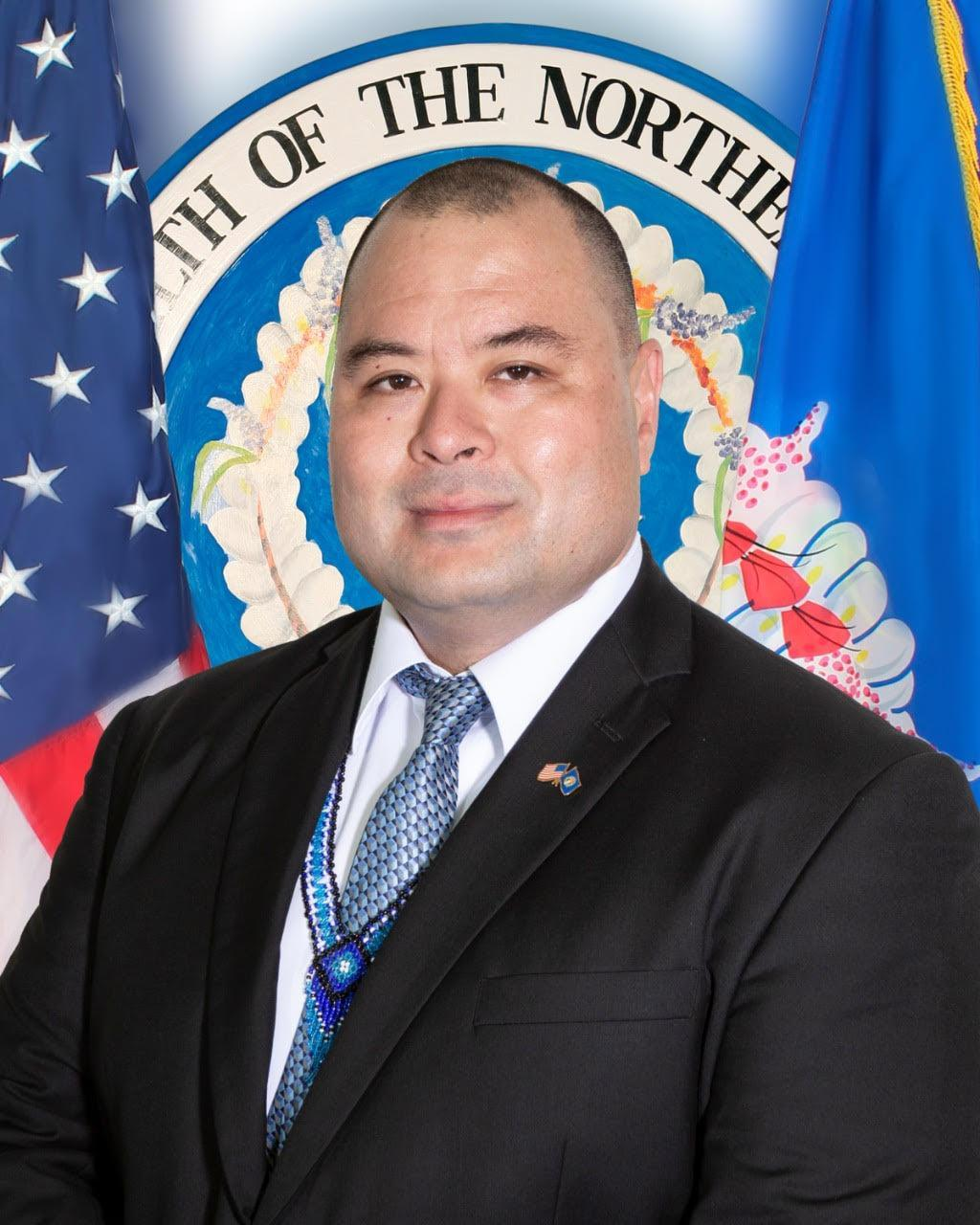
- Villagomez in 2021

Speaker of the Northern Mariana Islands House of Representatives
- Incumbent
- Assumed office January 10, 2021
- Preceded by: Blas T. Attao

Personal details
- Born: Edmund Joseph Sablan Villagomez
- Party: Covenant (before 2013); Independent (2013–present)

Edmund Joseph Sablan Villagomez is a politician from the Northern Mariana Islands who serves as the Speaker of the Northern Mariana Islands House of Representatives. He has served in the Northern Marianas Islands House of Representatives since January 11, 2010. He was a candidate for Lieutenant Governor in the 2026 election. He is a member of the Democratic Party, and was previously a member of the Covenant Party.

== Political career ==
Villagomez was an assistant to the CNMI Secretary of Commerce and the head of the Foreign Investment Office. Villagomez was first elected from District 3 in 2009 as a member of the Covenant Party. At the time of his election, he was the youngest person to be elected a member of the House of Representative in its history. He was sworn into office on January 10, 2010. In his first term, he was named the chairman of the Commerce and Tourism committee. He was a member of the special investigative committee to review the allegations included in the articles of impeachment against Governor Benigno Fitial.

Following the dissolution of the Covenant Party in 2013, Villagomez ran as an independent in the 2014 election. After the 2016 general election, the five member minority bloc named Villagomez as the House Minority Leader. He served as House Minority Leader during the 20th Commonwealth Legislature. For the 21st Commonwealth Legislature, he nominated, and was succeeded by, Ed Propst for the position of House Minority Leader for the 21st Commonwealth Legislature.

In the 22nd Commonwealth Legislature, a coalition of legislators led by a resurgent Democratic Party backed Villagomez for Speaker. On the fourth ballot, Representative Ralph Naraja Yumul switched his support to Villagomez. He was reelected to serve as Speaker for the 23rd Commonwealth Legislature by a unanimous voice vote. On January 8, 2025, it was announced that Villagomez would again be elected to the position of Speaker of the House of Representatives for the 24th Commonwealth Legislature. An investigation done by KANDIT News found that Villagomez was one of only two legislators to not take a legislative allowance from 2022-2025.

In July 2025, it was announced that Villagomez would run for Lieutenant Governor on a ticket with his predecessor as speaker Blas T. Attao in the 2026 election.

Political offices
Preceded by Blas T. Attao	Speaker of the Northern Mariana Islands House of Representatives; 2021–present	Incumbent
