= Ralph N. Yumul =

Northern Mariana Islander politician

Member of the Northern Mariana Islands House of Representatives from the 3rd district
- Incumbent
- Assumed office January 14, 2019

Personal details
- Born: Ralph Naraja Yumul; August 6, 1971 (age 55) Saipan
- Party: Republican
- Children: 3
- Education: California State University; National University

Ralph Naraja Yumul is a Northern Mariana Islander politician. He serves as a member for the 3rd district of the Northern Mariana Islands House of Representatives.

Ralph Naraja Yumul was born August 6, 1971, in Saipan. He attended California State University at Hayward before graduating from National University. For a time, he was the director of the Small Business Development Center operated by the CNMI Department of Commerce. He served on the Saipan Council prior to his 2012 election. Yumul was first elected in the 2012 general election. He was reelected in 2014, but was an unsuccessful candidate for reelection in 2016. He was elected in the 2018 general election. While Yumul has run without party affiliation in recent elections, he identifies as a Republican.

In the 2024 election for delegate to the United States House of Representatives, Yumul served as the campaign manager of Ed Propst's campaign. While Propst lost to Kimberlyn King-Hinds, Yumul was successfully reelected to serve in the House finishing fourth of eight candidates for Precinct #3's six seats.
