= Northern Mariana Islands House of Representatives =

Lower house of the Northern Mariana Islands Commonwealth Legislature

- 22nd Legislature

Type
- Type: Lower house of the Northern Mariana Islands Commonwealth Legislature

Leadership
- Speaker: Edmund Villagomez (I) since January 13, 2021
- Vice Speaker: Diego Camacho (D) since January 13, 2025
- Majority Leader: Marissa Flores (I) since January 13, 2025
- Minority Leader: Roy Ada (R) since February 19, 2025

Structure
- Seats: 20
- Political groups: Majority Caucus (14): Independent (12); Democratic (2); Minority Caucus (6): Independent (4); Republican (2)

Elections
- Last election: November 5, 2024
- Next election: November 3, 2026

The Northern Mariana Islands House of Representatives is the lower house of the Northern Mariana Islands Commonwealth Legislature.

In the 2007 election cycle, the CNMI House membership was increased from 18 to 20. Representatives serve two-year terms and are elected from seven election districts:

- District 1: Saipan (6 seats)
- District 2: Saipan (2 seats)
- District 3: Saipan & the Northern Islands (6 seats)
- District 4: Saipan (2 seats)
- District 5: Saipan (2 seats)
- District 6: Tinian (1 seat)
- District 7: Rota & Aguiguan (1 seat)

The Speaker of the Northern Mariana Islands House of Representatives is chosen by the House from among its members.

== Composition of the House of Representatives ==
Affiliation	Party (Shading indicates majority/plurality)					Total	
Affiliation	Republican	Independent		Democratic	Covenant	Total	Vacant
End of 18th Legislature	4	12		0	4	20	0
19th Legislature	7	13		0	0	20	0
20th Legislature	15	5		0	0	20	0
21st Legislature	13	7		0	0	20	0
Begin 22nd Legislature	9 (Note: One Republican voted with the Democratic–Independent coalition to elect the speaker of the House.)	1	2	8	0	20	0
July 23, 2021	8	1	2	8	0	19	1
October 16, 2021	8	1	2	9 (Note: A special election for Northern Mariana Islands House of Representatives District 3 was called for October 16, 2021 after the seat became vacant after Ivan A. Blanco (R) died while in office on July 23, 2021. Corina L. Magofna (D) won.)	0	20	0
23rd Legislature	3	1	12	4	0	20	0
24th Legislature	2	4	12	2	0	20	0
Latest voting share	30%		70%				

=== Leadership ===
For the 24th Commonwealth Legislature, Villagomez was reelected as speaker, a position in which he has served since 2021. Diego Camacho, one of the chamber's two Democratic members, was elected vice-speaker and Marissa Flores was elected floor leader. In February 2025, the five-member minority bloc informer Speaker Villagomez that they named Roy Ada as the new minority leader.

Office	Representative	Party
Speaker of the House	Edmund Villagomez	Independent
Vice Speaker	Diego Camacho	Democratic
Floor Leader	Marissa Flores	Independent
Minority Leader	Roy Ada	Republican

=== Members of the 24th Legislature ===
In the 2020 general election for the 22nd Legislature, the Republican Party won nine seats, a resurgent Democratic Party won eight seats, and three seats were won by independents. Two of those independents, Edmund Joseph Sablan Villagomez and Donald Manalang Manglona, are aligned with the Democratic Party while Joseph Flores is aligned with the Republican Party. On July 23, 2021, the death of Republican 3rd district representative Ivan Blanco created a vacancy, to be filled in an October 16 special election. Democrat Corina Magofna won the special election, flipping the seat. In the 2022 elections for the 23rd Legislature, independents made significant gains, reducing the number of Democrats and Republicans in the House. However, 12 of the 13 independents formed a coalition government with the 4 Democrats. In the 2024 general election, the INDEMS retained their majority, but the minority bloc grew to five members.

District	Name	Start	Party	Caucus
1 Saipan	Raymond Palacios	January 13, 2025	Independent	Majority
1 Saipan	Vincent Aldan	January 9, 2023	Independent	Majority
1 Saipan	Joseph Flores	January 14, 2019	Independent	Minority
1 Saipan	Roy Ada	January 11, 2021	Republican	Minority
1 Saipan	Diego Camacho	January 9, 2023	Democratic	Majority
1 Saipan	Roman Benavente	January 9, 2023	Independent	Majority
2 Saipan	Daniel Aquino	January 13, 2025	Independent	Minority
2 Saipan	John Sablan	January 2013	Independent	Majority
3 Saipan	Blas Attao	January 12, 2015	Independent	Majority
3 Saipan	Edmund Villagomez	January 11, 2010	Independent	Majority
3 Saipan	Ralph Yumul	January 14, 2019	Independent	Majority
3 Saipan	Denita Yangetmai	January 11, 2021	Democratic	Majority
3 Saipan	Marissa Flores	January 9, 2023	Independent	Majority
3 Saipan	Elias Rangamar	January 13, 2025	Independent	Minority
4 Saipan	Malcolm Omar	January 9, 2023	Independent	Majority
4 Saipan	Joel Camacho	January 14, 2019	Independent	Majority
5 Saipan	Angelo Camacho	January 9, 2023	Independent	Majority
5 Saipan	Thomas Manglona	January 3, 2023	Independent	Majority
6 Tinian	Patrick San Nicolas	January 11, 2021	Republican	Minority
7 Rota	Julie Ogo	January 9, 2023	Independent	Majority

== See also ==
- Northern Mariana Islands Senate
- List of Northern Mariana Islands Governors
