= Impeachment in the Northern Mariana Islands =

In the Commonwealth of the Northern Mariana Islands (a United States territory), the process of impeachment allows its Commonwealth Legislature to remove certain officeholders. The territory's House of Representatives can initiate an impeachment, bringing about an impeachment trial in the territory's Senate through which an officeholder can be removed from their office.

Two governors have been impeached: Benigno Fitial in 2013 and Ralph Torres in 2022. Fittal resigned after being impeached, while Torres was acquitted in his impeachment trial. Both impeached governors were members of the Republican Party.

== Impeachment law ==
The sole power to hold a vote to impeach is vested in the House of Representatives. A two-thirds vote is needed to impeach. Impeachment trials are conducted before the Senate. A two-thirds vote is needed to convict. There is no directive given by constitution or law as to who the presiding officer for an impeachment trial should be.

The consequence for conviction in an impeachment trial is removal from office.

Officials that are subject to impeachment are the governor, lieutenant governor, attorney general, justices and judges. The specified reasons for which a governor or lieutenant governor may be impeached are "treason, commission of a felony, corruption or neglect of duty." The specified reasons for which an attorney general may be impeached are, "treason, commission of a felony or crime of moral turpitude, corruption, or neglect of duty." The specified reason for which justices and judges may be impeached are, "treason, conviction of a felony, corruption, neglect of duty or conviction of any crime involving moral turpitude."

== Impeachment of Governor Benigno Fitial in 2013 ==
In 2013, Governor Benigno Fitial was impeached

A minority bloc in the Commonwealth of the Northern Mariana Islands' House of Representatives filed an impeachment resolution August 28, 2012 against Governor Fitial, who was at that time in the United States for the Republican National Convention. The resolution was filed by Joseph Deleon Guerrero, a former Republican who left the party and became an independent. It accused the governor of "multiple felonies, multiple acts of public corruption" and of neglecting official duties. Marianas' Governor Benigno Fitial facing impeachment bid All charges were eventually dismissed.

On February 11 & 12, 2013 the CNMI House of Representatives voted to impeach Fitial on 18 different charges contained in Articles of Impeachment. The charges include neglect of duties, commission of felonies and abuse of power. Rather than facing an impeachment trial before the CNMI Senate which was set for March 7, 2013, Benigno Repeki Fitial became the first governor in CNMI history to resign from office on February 20, 2013. In his resignation letter he cited "personal health" reasons and the "best interests of the Commonwealth".

Fitial became the first governor in any US insular area and the 13th in the history of the nation to be impeached (February 11, 2013). The CNMI House of Representatives pre-filed 18 Articles of Impeachment against Fitial on the day of their Inauguration (January 14, 2013). They voted to adopt 13 of the Articles of Impeachment on February 11, 2013, and adopted the remaining 5 Articles of Impeachment on February 12, 2013. All 18 charges were transmitted to the Senate where Fitial would have stood trial had he not resigned. He was impeached by the CNMI House of Representatives on February 11, 2013, and was scheduled to face trial before the CNMI Senate to determine if he should be removed from office.

House Votes:

	Charge	Yes	No	Abstain
Article 1	Commission of Felony	16	4	0
Article 2	Commission of Felony	16	4	0
Article 3	Commission of Felony	16	4	0
Article 4	Commission of Felony	16	4	0
Article 5	Corruption	16	4	0
Article 6	Corruption	16	4	0

	Charge	Yes	No	Abstain
Article 7	Corruption	16	4	0
Article 8	Corruption	16	4	0
Article 9	Corruption	16	4	0
Article 10	Neglect	16	3	1
Article 11	Neglect	16	4	0
Article 12	Neglect	16	4	0

	Charge	Yes	No	Abstain
Article 13	Neglect	16	4	0
Article 14	Neglect	16	4	0
Article 15	Neglect	15	4	1
Article 16	Neglect	16	3	1
Article 17	Neglect	16	4	0
Article 18	Neglect	16	4	0

"No" votes: Minority leader George Camacho (R-Saipan), Reps. Felicidad Ogumoro (R-Saipan), Teresita Santos (R-Rota), and Richard Seman (R-Saipan) === except for Article 10 - Rep. George Camacho abstained due to conflict.

"Yes" votes: House Speaker Joseph Deleon Guerrero (IR-Saipan), Vice Speaker Frank Dela Cruz (IR-Saipan), floor leader Ralph Demapan (Cov-Saipan), Reps. Antonio Agulto (IR-Saipan), Anthony Benavente (IR-Saipan), Roman Benavente (IR-Saipan), Trenton Conner (Ind-Tinian), Lorenzo Deleon Guerrero (IR-Saipan), Cris Leon Guerrero (Cov-Saipan), Janet Maratita (IR-Saipan), John P. Sablan (Cov-Saipan), Tony Sablan (IR-Saipan), Mario Taitano (IR-Saipan), Ray Tebuteb (IR-Saipan), Edmund Villagomez (Cov-Saipan), and Ralph N. Yumul (IR-Saipan) === except for Article 15 - Rep. Roman Benavente abstained unknown reasons.

== Impeachment of Governor Ralph Torres in 2022 ==
=== JGO Committee investigation and other investigations ===
In office since 2015, Torres had generated controversy and criticism for sizable travel costs, his involvement with the Hong Kong-headquartered Imperial Pacific Casino, and his being the subject of an 2019 FBI raid as part of a criminal investigation that also involved the casino operator.

In 2019, after the FBI executed a warrant for search and seizure on Torres' residence, the House's Judicial and Government Operations Committee (JGO Committee) began investigating Torres. The House had a Republican Party majority and a Democratic Party minority at the time.

In January 2020, the Democrat minority published a minority report on the governor's use of public funds. The report took note of $490,000 in travel spending being spent to fund more than 102 trips taken by Torres and his companions, including premium-class air travel. The minority report cited CNMI law to argue that it was illegal to spend public money on premium-class airfare. The minority report also argued that it had been illegal to spend $82,000 on the travel costs of Torres' wife Diann Torres, since "first lady" is not an official government role and the regulations of the CNMI Department of Finance prohibited public money to be used to pay for the travel expenses of nongovernment employees.

The allegations of exorbitant and improper spending of government funds came at a time in which the Northern Mariana Islands was experiencing economic troubles and the government was imposing austerity measures. The territory was still recovering from the impact of Typhoon Yutu, which hit the territory in 2018. Gross domestic product (GDP) of the territory declined 11.3 in 2019. These optics increased as the investigation carried on, with February 2020 seeing Torres propose further austerity measures after the early impact of COVID-19 pandemic on tourism to the territory. Federal restrictions were imposed in February 2020 on travel from China, which was impacted by the pandemic earlier than other nations. This threatened the loss of tens of thousands of Chinese tourists that had previously traveled to the territory every year. Further austerity legislation was signed into law in October 2020. The COVID-19 pandemic had a severe negative impact on the economy of the Northern Mariana Islands, with its GDP decreasing 29.7% in 2020.

In April 2021, the Democrats, now in the House majority, reopened the JGO investigation, continuing the work that occurred in the previous Republican-majority House. The investigation intensified in, with subpoenas being issued for close associates of Torres and testimony even being sought from his wife, chief of staff, and members of his personal security detail. While maintaining his innocence, Torres refused to comply with JGO Committee's requests for his testimony, and disobeyed a subpoena from the committee. Accusing the JGO Committee's investigation of being a political stunt by the House Democrats, Torres sued the committee in an effort to block their subpoena of him.

In September 2021, Lieutenant Governor Arnold Palacios testified before the JGO Committee after having been subpoenaed to do so. The following month, he politically split from Torres and announced his intent to run as an independent against Torres in the 2022 Northern Mariana Islands gubernatorial election, Palacios cited a "crisis of confidence in our government, a crisis of trust in the people who run our government" in announcing his challenge to Torres.

In November 2021, Torres' executive secretary, Frances Dela Cruz, was held in criminal contempt for refusing to answer questions by the JGO Committee.

=== Impeachment ===
On December 16, 2021, House leadership pre-filed an impeachment resolution. The impeachment resolution cited commission of felonies, corruption, and neglect of duty as the constitutionally impeachable offenses it alleged were committed by Torres. The articles of impeachment related to improper use of government resources, corruption, unlawful first class and business class travel, negligence during a time of crisis, neglect of duty, and contempt of the legislature. The six articles of impeachment alleged:

- Article 1: "Commission of felony, theft of utility services"
  - Using his position to receive more than $177,000 in taxpayer-funded utility benefits at his privately owned residences (including for a commercial piggery operation on one of his properties).
- Article II: "Commission of felony, theft"
  - Using public funds to travel to campaign events held in Oregon and Guam
  - Reimbursing himself for $919 in fuel, which he made the allegedly-uncorroborated claim had been used to fuel a public safety boat
  - Receiving reimbursement for $690 for lodging expenses, despite having received a per diem for the trip in question
- Article III: "Unlawful first-Class and business-class travel"
  - Using public funds for at least 54 first-class and business-class airline tickets used by himself and his wife in violation of CNMI Law
- Article IV: "Corruption, misuse of government resources"
  - Receiving fraudulent reimbursement for personal expenses, including money used for a private birthday celebration brunch, rifle cases, supplies for hunting and camping, coolers, and electronics
  - Using his office to request and/or grant approval to 85 boating trips
  - Using public safety resources for recreational purposes, including for fishing trips.
- Article V: "Neglect of duty, negligence during crisis"
  - Taking more than 120 "off island" trips during times of natural disaster and austerity (such as a 2020 three-week fishing trip to the Northern Islands)
- Article VI: "Neglect of duty, contempt of the legislature"
  - Failing to comply with subpoenas issued by the JGO Committee's investigation

On January 5, 2022, the JGO Committee unanimously voted in favor of recommending the adoption of the impeachment resolution.

On January 11, 2022 the House voted 15–4, with a single abstention, to adopt the articles of impeachment and thereby impeach Torres. Each article of impeachment was voted on separately prior to being adopted together in their entirety. All four votes against impeachment came from Republicans, with House opponents of the impeachment characterizing the impeachment as politically partisan and alleging that there was a lack of information and relevant legislation to justify impeachment.

Impeachment of Ralph Torres, governor of the Northern Mariana Islands (House Resolution 22-14) January 12, 2022
	Party				Total votes
	Democratic	Independent Democrat	Republican	Independent Republican	Total votes
Yea	9	2	1	3	15
Nay	0	0	4	0	4

Vote by member
District	Member	Party	Vote
1	Roy Ada	R	Nay
3	Blas Jonathan T. Attao	Ind. R	Yea
1	Celina Babauta	D	Yea
4	Sheila Babauta	D	Yea
4	Joel Castro Camacho	R	Yea
3	Vincente Camacho	D	Yea
1	Angel Demapan	R	Nay
1	Joseph Flores	Ind. R	Abstension
1	Joseph Guerrero	R	Nay
5	Richard T. Lizama	D	Yea
3	Corina Magofna	D	Yea
7	Donald M. Manglona	Ind. D	Yea
1	Edwin Propst	D	Yea
2	John Paul P. Sablan	Ind. R	Yea
2	Tina Sablan	D	Yea
6	Patrick H. San Nicolas	R	Nay
5	Leila Staffler	D	Yea
3	Edmund Villagomez	Ind. D	Yea
3	Denita Yangetmai	D	Yea
3	Ralph N. Yumul	Ind. R	Yea

=== Impeachment trial ===
On January 15, 2022, the impeachment resolution was transmitted from the House to the Senate.

On March 10, 2022, the Senate adopted by a 5-3 vote the impeachment rules that had been proposed by both its Committee on Judiciary, Government, Law and Federal Relations and its Committee on Executive Appointments and Governmental Regulations. Special counsel Joe McDoulett was retained by Senate President Jude Hofschneider (a Republican) to help with the impeachment rules. Several floor amendments had been proposed, but were rejected 3–5. The adopted rules set clear and convincing evidence as the burden of proof to used when weighing guilt. The rules also required that, when the Senate could hold closed door votes and closed door discussion of the impeachment during the trial, the final verdict of the trial must be reached in public session.

On January 26, 2022, Senate President Jude Hofschneider requested that Chief Justice Alexandro C. Castro of the Northern Mariana Islands Supreme Court to preside over the impeachment trial, or alternatively someone designated by Castro and approved by a vote of the Senate. However, on January 31, 2022, Castro and associate justices John A. Manglona and Perry B. Inos sent Hofschneider a letter declining to preside over the impeachment trial. The letter cited the lack of a specific constitutional authority or directive given to members of the Supreme Court to preside over such a trial, and also expressed a view that their involvement in the trial would enrich upon authority that is vested in the Legislature, thereby harming the separation of powers. It further expressed their view that an impeachment trial in the Senate is a "uniquely legislative and political function that does not fall under the purview of the judicial branch under the NMI Constitution," and which is therefore distinguished from a civil or criminal court proceeding.

At the time of the trial, the Senate had a Republican majority, with there being six Republicans, one independent aligned with the Republicans, one Democrat, and one independent aligned with the Democrats. Presuming all members voted on conviction, "guilty" votes would be needed from six senators in order to reach the two-thirds threshold required for a conviction. Ultimately, however, two Republicans recused themselves from the trial proceedings due to conflicts of interest. Senate Vice President Justo Quitugua recused himself for being a relative of Torres, while Senate Floor Leader Vinnie Sablan recused himself due to his being named as Torres' lieutenant gubernatorial running mate in the upcoming 2022 gubernatorial election. Both were Republicans.

Shortly ahead of the start of the impeachment trial, Senator Paul Manglona, an independent, joined a pro se complaint against the Senate seeking to halt the impeachment trial over alleged violations that had occurred during the impeachment process. The lawsuit took issues with the rules adopted for the trial, and sought to prevent the trial from proceeding under those rules. They also wanted the court to declare that there had been an Open Government Act violation by the Senate. It also sought a prohibition on what it argued would be "unreasonable restrictions" on the presentation to be provided by the impeachment managers. It also sought for the court to find that abstentions in the conviction vote must be rendered the same as an affirmative vote for conviction.

Articles of Impeachment, Senate judgement (2/3 "guilty" vote necessary for a conviction)
Article I	Party				Total votes
Article I	Democratic	Independent Democrat	Republican	Independent Republican	Total votes
Guilty	1	1	0	1	3
Not guilty	0	0	4	0	4
Article II	Party				Total votes
Article II	Democratic	Independent Democrat	Republican	Independent Republican	Total votes
Guilty	1	1	0	1	3
Not guilty	0	0	4	0	4
Article III	Party				Total votes
Article III	Democratic	Independent Democrat	Republican	Independent Republican	Total votes
Guilty	1	1	0	1	3
Not guilty	0	0	4	0	4
Article IV	Party				Total votes
Article IV	Democratic	Independent Democrat	Republican	Independent Republican	Total votes
Guilty	1	1	0	1	3
Not guilty	0	0	4	0	4
Article V	Party				Total votes
Article V	Democratic	Independent Democrat	Republican	Independent Republican	Total votes
Guilty	1	1	0	1	3
Not guilty	0	0	4	0	4
Article VI	Party				Total votes
Article VI	Democratic	Independent Democrat	Republican	Independent Republican	Total votes
Guilty	1	1	0	1	3
Not guilty	0	0	4	0	4

Vote by member
District	Member	Party	Votes on articles I, II, II, IV, V, VI
2	Francisco Q. Cruz	R	Nay
3	Edith DeLeon Guerrero	D	Yea
1	Victor Hocog	R	Nay
2	Jude Hofschneider	R	Nay
2	Karl King-Nabors	R	Nay
1	Paul Manglona	Ind.	Yea
3	Justo Quitugua	R	Abstension
3	Vinnie Sablan	R	Abstension
1	Teresita Santos	Ind.	Yea

=== Aftermath ===
Torres continued to face federal investigation into his gubernatorial administration after the impeachment. In November 2022, Arnold Palacios defeated Torres by a wide margin in the runoff of the gubernatorial election.

== See also ==
- Impeachment by state and territorial governments of the United States
- Impeachment in the United States
