= 1999 Northern Mariana Islands general election =

- November 6, 1999
- Senate election
- 3 of the 9 seats in the Senate; 5 seats needed for a majority
Party	Seats
Republican	6
Democratic	2
Reform	1
This lists parties that won seats. See the complete results below.
- House election
- All 18 seats in the House of Representatives; 10 seats needed for a majority
Party	Seats
Republican	11
Democratic	6
Independents	1
This lists parties that won seats. See the complete results below.

The 1999 Northern Mariana Islands general election was held on November 6, 1999. Voters in the Northern Mariana Islands voted for 3 seats in the Northern Mariana Islands Senate, all eighteen seats in the Northern Mariana Islands House of Representatives, seats for the municipal council, and seats for the board of education, and a judge. There were also 4 other legislative initiatives, 2 of which were voted on by all CNMI voters, while 1 was voted on only by Rota voters and 1 only by Tinian voters.

The 1999 elections marked the first time a third party lawmaker was elected in the Northern Mariana Islands, with the newly formed Reform Party achieving a "stunning upset and defeat of formidable incumbent Senator Juan P. Tenorio (Morgen) by newcomer Ramon "Kumoi" Santos Deleon Guerrero."

== Background ==
The 1999 elections takes place in the aftermath of the Japanese asset price bubble and the 1997 Asian financial crisis, which saw as many as 2,000 businesses in the CNMI close down, severely affecting the ruling incumbent Republican party. Tourism has been significantly negatively affected and austerity measures have begun to pressure the population as the economy has turned negative since Governor Pedro Pangelinan Tenorio took office. The Asian financial crisis severely affected the CNMI's main tourist market of East Asia, including South Korea and Japan, the latter also being a key investor in the CNMI since the implementation of the Plaza Accords in 1986 which saw the Japanese investing their surplus of dollars throughout the world. Throughout the period of the Japanese asset price bubble, from 1986 to 1991, "It has been estimated that from 3/4 to one billion dollars in foreign investment flowed into the Commonwealth during the short period of about six years—most of it Japanese." The bursting of this price bubble saw Japanese investment in the CNMI dry up and severely impacted the Commonwealth. Before and during this period of economic turmoil, the CNMI Legislature potentially exacerbated the economic situation by implementing policies that hindered businesses and frequently changed laws and regulations to the detriment and irritation of businesses.

This election also marks the year that The Reform Party was founded by former Governor Froilan C. Tenorio, who claimed to be disgruntled and tired of the disunity showed by his former political affiliation, the Democrats.

== Northern Mariana Islands Commonwealth Legislature ==
=== Results summary ===
Parties	House Election Results		Seat Change	Party Strength
Parties	1997	1999	+/−	Strength
Republican	13	11	2 ▼	61.11%
Democratic	5	6	1 ▲	33.33%
Independent	0	1	1 ▲	5.56%
Totals	18	18	Steady	100.00%

Parties	Senate Election Results		Seat Change	Party Strength
Parties	1997	1999	+/−	Strength
Republican	8	6	2 ▼	66.67%
Democratic	1	2	1 ▲	22.22%
Reform	Did Not Exist	1	1 ▲	11.11%
Totals	9	9	Steady	100.00%

=== Senate ===
The Northern Mariana Islands Senate is the upper house of the Northern Mariana Islands Commonwealth Legislature, consisting of nine senators representing three senatorial districts (Saipan & the Northern Islands, Tinian & Aguijan, and Rota), each a Multi-member district with three senators. three seats in the Northern Mariana Islands Senate were up for the 1999 election.

Rota 1st Senatorial District (1 seat)
Party	Candidate	Votes	%
Republican	Paul Atalig Manglona	728	71.30%
Independent	Glenn Hocog Manglona	293	28.70%
Total votes		1,021	100.00%

Tinian 2nd Senatorial District (1 seat)
Party	Candidate	Votes	%
Democratic	David M. Cing	500	55.37%
Republican	Jose Ada Hocog	403	44.63%
Total votes		903	100.00%

Saipan & Northern Islands 3rd Senatorial District (1 seat)
Party	Candidate	Votes	%
Reform	Ramon S. Deleon Guerrero	4,420	52.67%
Republican	Juan P. Tenorio	3,970	47.33%
Total votes		8,390	100.00%

=== House of Representatives ===
The Northern Mariana Islands House of Representatives is the lower house of the Northern Mariana Islands Commonwealth Legislature. The house has six districts, several of which are Multi-member districts. All 18 seats in the Northern Mariana Islands House of Representatives were contested in the 1999 election.

House of Representative - District 1: Saipan (6 seats)
Party	Candidate	Votes	%
Republican	David Mundo Apatang	2,192	10.04%
Democratic	Brigida "Bridget" Deleion Guererro Ichihara	2,059	9.44%
Democratic	Rosiky F. Camacho	1,785	8.18%
Republican	Martin B. Ada	1,776	8.14%
Democratic	Florencio T. Deleion Guererro	1,330	6.10%
Democratic	Antonio M. Camacho	1,315	6.03%
Republican	Ana S. Teregeyo	1,274	5.84%
Republican	Manuel A. Tenorio	1,250	5.73%
Republican	Herman T. Palacios	1,232	5.65%
Democratic	Francisco Deleion Guererro Demapan	1,230	5.64%
Republican	Karl T. Reyes	1,194	5.47%
Reform	Pedro P. Castro	1,067	4.89%
Democratic	Juan Borja Tudela	1,037	4.75%
Independent	Benjamin M. Cepeda	881	4.04%
Reform	Joseph M. Palacios	807	3.70%
Reform	Pedreo T. Nakatsukasa	391	1.79%
Total votes		21,820	100.00%

House of Representative - District 2: Saipan (2 seats)
Party	Candidate	Votes	%
Republican	Oscar Manglona Babauta	504	32.36%
Republican	Diego Tenorio Benavente	502	32.22%
Reform	Anicia Q. Tomokane	304	19.51%
Reform	Vicente Hosono Sablan	248	15.91%
Total votes		1,558	100.00%

House of Representative - District 3: Saipan & Northern Islands (6 seats)
Party	Candidate	Votes	%
Republican	Heinz Sablan Hofschneider	1,623	13.48%
Republican	Benigno Repeki Fitial	1,394	11.57%
Independent	Maria T. Peter	1,346	11.18%
Republican	Jesus T. Attao	1,311	10.89%
Republican	Estanislao T. Torres	1,251	10.39%
Republican	William S. Torres	1,159	9.63%
Democratic	Maximo L. Olopai	1,084	9.00%
Republican	Melvin Lawrence O. Faisao	1,040	8.64%
Democratic	Luis S. Camacho	896	7.44%
Democratic	Isidro A. Sabaln	630	5.23%
Reform	Joaquin T. Quitugua	307	2.55%
Total votes		12,041	100.00%

House of Representative - District 4: Saipan (2 seats)
Party	Candidate	Votes	%
Democratic	Edredino M. Jones	711	22.11%
Republican	Thoman B. Pangelinan	656	20.40%
Independent	Justo Songao Quitugua	528	16.42%
Republican	Frank G. Cepeda	522	16.23%
Independent	Benigno M. Sablan	474	14.74%
Reform	Josephine Deleion Guererro Mesta	324	10.08%
Total votes		3,215	100.00%

House of Representative - District 5: Tinian (1 seat)
Party	Candidate	Votes	%
Democratic	Norman S. Palacios	470	52.04%
Republican	Henry H. San Nicolas	433	47.96%
Total votes		903	100.00%

House of Representative - District 6: Rota (1 seat)
Party	Candidate	Votes	%
Republican	Alejo M. Mendiola	621	57.50%
Democratic	Luis Masga Sablan	459	42.50%
Total votes		1,080	100.00%

== Municipal Council ==
Municipal Council - Saipan & Northern Islands (non-partisan)
Party	Candidate	Votes	%
Nonpartisan	Jesus SN Lizama	4,866	26.12%
Nonpartisan	David A. Indalecio	4,759	25.54%
Nonpartisan	Gregorio V. Deleion Guererro	4,739	25.43%
Nonpartisan	Canice K. Taitano	4,255	22.91%
Total votes		18,619	100.00%

Municipal Council - Tinian and Aguiguan (non-partisan)
Party	Candidate	Votes	%
Nonpartisan	Juanita M. Mendiola	486	18.25%
Nonpartisan	Antonio H. Borja	475	17.84%
Nonpartisan	Antonio O Kiyoshi	448	16.82%
Nonpartisan	Evelyn B. Manglona	433	16.27%
Nonpartisan	Juan O Barcinas	415	15.58%
Nonpartisan	Esteven M. King	408	15.33%
Total votes		2,665	100.00%

Municipal Council - Rota (non-partisan)
Party	Candidate	Votes	%
Nonpartisan	Jose M. Rosario	632	21.56%
Nonpartisan	Kevin T. Atalig	606	20.66%
Nonpartisan	Abraham M. Ogo	577	19.67%
Nonpartisan	Alexander A. Apatang	434	14.81%
Nonpartisan	Alice A. Ladore	392	13.36%
Nonpartisan	Steve K. Mesngon	291	9.93%
Total votes		2,932	100.00%

== Board of education ==
Board of Education - Saipan & Northern Islands (non-partisan)
Party	Candidate	Votes	%
Nonpartisan	Esther S. Fleming	6,110	46.55%
Nonpartisan	Roman C. Benavente	4,385	33.43%
Nonpartisan	Edward H. Manglona	2,628	20.02%
Total votes		13,123	100.00%

Board of Education - Rota (non-partisan)
Party	Candidate	Votes	%
Nonpartisan	Marja Lee C. Taitano	349	51.51%
Nonpartisan	Juanita M. Taisacan	328	48.49%
Total votes		677	100.00%

== Judges ==
Judge	For retention		Against retention		Total
Judge	Votes	%	Votes	%	Total
Judge Timothy H. Bellas					

== Referendum ==
Senate Legislative Initiative 11-1 (SLI 11–1)	Votes	%
For		
Against		
Invalid/blank votes		–
Total		
Registered voters/turnout	15,118	

Senate Legislative Initiative 11-4 (SLI 11–4)	Votes	%
For		
Against		
Invalid/blank votes		–
Total		
Registered voters/turnout	15,118	

The Tinian Popular Initiative	Votes	%
For		
Against		
Invalid/blank votes		–
Total		
Qualified voters/turnout	1,045	

The Rota Popular Initiative	Votes	%
For		
Against		
Invalid/blank votes		–
Total		
Qualified voters/turnout	1,293	
