= 2009 Northern Mariana Islands general election =

- Gubernatorial election
- November 7, 2009 (first round); November 23, 2009 (runoff)
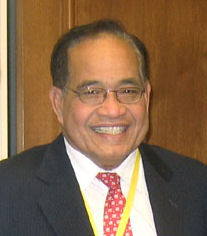

Nominee	Benigno Fitial	Heinz Hofschneider
Party	Covenant	Republican
Running mate	Eloy Inos	Arnold Palacios
Popular vote	6,610	6,240
Percentage	51.44%	48.56%
- Results by voting district: Benigno Fitial: 50–55% 55–60% 65–70% Heinz Hofschneider: 50–55%
Governor before election
Benigno Repeki Fitial
Covenant
Elected Governor
Benigno Repeki Fitial
Covenant
- Senate election
- November 7, 2009
- 6 of the 9 seats in the Senate; 5 seats needed for a majority
Party	Seats	+/–
Republican	5	+2
Independents	4	+3
This lists parties that won seats. See the complete results below.
- House election
- November 7, 2009
- All 20 seats in the House of Representatives; 11 seats needed for a majority
Party	Seats	+/–
Republican	9	−3
Covenant	7	+3
Independents	4	+1
This lists parties that won seats. See the complete results below.
- Mayoral elections
- 4 Mayors
Party	Seats
Republican	2
Independents	2
This lists parties that won seats. See the complete results below.

General elections were held in the Northern Mariana Islands on November 7, 2009. Voters in the Northern Mariana Islands voted for the Governor of the Northern Mariana Islands, 6 seats in the Northern Mariana Islands Senate, all twenty seats in the Northern Mariana Islands House of Representatives, 4 mayors, seats for the municipal council, and seats for the board of education. Additionally, a referendum was held.

This was the last general election to be held on an odd year. This election also saw the extension all office holding officials by one year to move the elections to even-years, corresponding with the elections of other federal and state offices, including the nationwide United States House of Representatives elections and the United States general elections. This election also oversaw the first run-off to be held in the Northern Mariana Islands, which were held on November 23, 2009. Benigno Repeki Fitial became the first governor to win a second term since 1985 and the first time a candidate won a majority since 1993 thanks to the newly implemented run-off voting system.

== Background ==
A total of 16,146 voters registered to vote with the Commonwealth Election Commission for the 2009 election. That is a 15% increase in voters compared to the 15,118 people who registered to vote in the 2005 general election. Precinct 1 on Saipan, which includes the villages of San Antonio, San Vicente and Koblerville, had the most number of registered voters at 4,331. Voter registration ended on September 18, 2009.

A total of 109 candidates vied for the 43 elected positions in the Northern Mariana Islands in the 2009 election. The contested offices included the offices of governor & lieutenant governor, the twenty seats in the House of Representative, six (of nine) seats in the Senate as well as mayoral posts and various local offices.

At least 18,000 ballots designed to be read by counting machines were printed in Alabama for the 2009 election, according to the executive director of the Election Commission, Robert Guerrero.

In early 2009, Benigno Fitial, known as Uncle Ben, was under extreme pressure from his rivals and the general populace, being known as the unpopular incumbent who broke all his major campaign promises. He had stopped paying Retirement Fund contributions. The Commonwealth Utilities Corporation was on the verge of collapse. The Commonwealth had lost a major part of its self-determination through the lost control over minimum wage and immigration to the United States Federal Government. His Lieutenant Governor Timothy Pangelinan Villagomez and Commerce Secretary James A. Santos were in federal prison for corruption.

== Campaign ==
Major election issues included the Commonwealth's faltering economy and the federalization of the Northern Mariana Islands' immigration by the United States government.

Republican Hofschneider and his running mate, Palacios, challenged incumbent governor Benigno Fitial and his running mate, Lieutenant Governor Eloy Inos, in the general election. Former legislator Juan "Pan" Tenorio Guerrero ran as an independent, with sitting CNMI Rep. Joe Camacho as his running mate. Another former legislator, Ramon "Kumoi" Deleon Guerrero, campaigned as an independent, with former Education Commissioner David M. Borja as his running mate. The race was widely viewed as a rematch between Fitial and Hofschneider, who was narrowly defeated in 2005.

The gubernatorial candidates focused heavily on the estimated 3,000 Northern Mariana Islanders residing on the United States mainland, many of whom were eligible to vote be absentee ballot. Three of the four gubernatorial candidates - Governor Fitial, Hofschneider and Juan Pan Guerrero - attended a Labor Day festival for Northern Mariana Islanders in San Diego, California, in September 2009. Independent candidate Juan "Pan" Tenorio Guerrero and his running mate, Joe Camacho, campaigned throughout the western United States in August and September. Guerrero and Camacho began campaigning in Salem and Portland, Oregon, before travelling to Seattle, Boise, Idaho, San Francisco, Las Vegas, San Diego and Honolulu.

Because of broken campaign promises and the major corruption scandals the administration faced, Benigno Fitial had trouble with his record during the campaign. Instead, he told the electorate to "Let it BE!" as he skillfully exploited the still simmering rift between the two GOP factions. He also promised many government jobs and contracts to key Republicans.

The Democratic Party of the Northern Mariana Islands did not nominate a candidate for governor in 2009. The only offices which were contested by the Democrats in 2009 were certain seats in the legislature and the mayorship of Saipan.

== Gubernatorial election ==
The incumbent Governor, Benigno Fitial of the Covenant Party, successfully ran for a second term; his running mate, Lt. Governor Eloy Inos, was elected to his first full term. Fitial faced three challengers in the November 7 general election: Republican nominee Heinz Hofschneider, independent Juan "Pan" Tenorio Guerrero, and independent Ramon "Kumoi" Deleon Guerrero.

Because of a law signed by Governor Fitial on July 24, 2009, a runoff election between the candidates who received the highest and second-highest vote totals would be required if no candidate obtained more than 50% of the overall vote. Under this 2009 law, a runoff would occur 14 days after the results of the general election are certified by the Commonwealth Election Commission. This election indeed required a runoff, as neither Fitial nor Hofschneider garnered more than 50% of the vote in the November 7 election.

On election day, Republican challenger Hofschneider received 4,900 votes and incumbent governor Fitial received 4,892 votes, therefore advancing to the runoff election held on November 23, 2009. Of the 13,784 total votes cast in the first round on November 7, Hofschneider led Fitial by just 8 votes, the closest gubernatorial election in the history of the Northern Mariana Islands. In the November 23 runoff election, Governor Fital was reelected by a 370-vote margin. With a margin of 2.8%, this election was the closest race of the 2009 gubernatorial election cycle.

Benigno Fitial was elected to serve a five-year term in office as governor instead of the normal four-year term, due to the Senate Legislative Initiative 16–11, which was one of the four ballot initiatives ratified in the November 7 election. Under the Senate Legislative Initiative 16–11, future general (including gubernatorial) elections will be held only in even-numbered years instead of odd-numbered years, such as 2009. Therefore, the next gubernatorial election took place in 2014 rather than 2013.

=== Candidates ===
==== Covenant Party ====
- Benigno R. Fitial, incumbent governor of the Northern Mariana Islands (serving since 2006) and former Northern Mariana Islands Representatives (including tenure as Speaker of the House)
  - Eloy Inos is Fitial's running mate. Inos was appointed and confirmed as Lt. Governor on May 1, 2009, following the resignation of Timothy Villagomez.

==== Independents ====
- Juan "Pan" Tenorio Guerrero
  - Joe Camacho is Guerrero's running mate. Camacho is currently a Republican Representative and Floor Leader of the Northern Mariana Islands House of Representatives.
- Ramon "Kumoi" Deleon Guerrero, former Northern Mariana Islands Senator (serving 2000–2004)
  - David Borja, a former Education Commissioner, is Guerrero's running mate.

==== Republican Party ====
Former Northern Mariana Governor Juan N. Babauta, a Republican, declared his intention to run for governor and challenge Fitial in January 2009. His running mate was Galvin Deleon Guerrero, a member of the CNMI Board of Education. Babauta was then defeated in the Republican primary by sitting CNMI Rep. Heinz Sablan Hofschneider, a former Speaker of the House, for the Republican Party nomination. Hofschneider's running mate is CNMI Rep. Arnold Indalecio Palacios, the current Speaker of the House.

Before the Republican primary, which was held on June 27, 2009, Hofschneider and Babauta signed a unity pledge, with each candidate pledging to support the winner of the primary. Hofschneider won the primary on June 27 with about 53% of the votes cast. Hofschneider won at six of the eight precincts. After the results were announced, the candidates convened and embraced; Babauta threw his support to Hofschneider and said that he would accept the people's decision. After Babauta had asked his supporters to vote for Hofschneider in the general election, Hofschneider called Babauta and his supporters "a crucial part of the campaign toward November."

Republican Primary results
Party	Candidate	Votes	%
Republican	Heinz S. Hofschneider	3,382	53
Republican	Juan N. Babauta	2,986	47
Total votes		6,368	100

=== Polling ===
Source	Dates Administered	Fitial (C)	Hofschneider (R)	Juan Guerrero (I)	Ramon Guerrero (I)	Undecided
University of Guam	October 27, 2009	27%	27%	19%	12%	16%
Marianas Consulting	October 29 - Nov. 4, 2009	15%	29%	20%	7%	22%

=== Election day ===
Polls on election day opened at 7 a.m. on November 7, 2009. Three of the four gubernatorial candidates cast their ballots in the morning at Garapan Elementary School in Garapan, Saipan. Incumbent governor Benigno Fitial and First Lady Josie Fitial voted at 7:10 a.m., Ramon "Kumoi" Deleon Guerrero arrived at the school at 7:20 a.m. and independent candidate Juan Pan Guerrero voted after 9 a.m. Republican candidate Heinz Hofschneider also voted at Garapan Elementary School at 6 p.m. later that day. An estimated 84% of registered voters participated in the election.

In the November 7 general election, Republican challenger Heinz Hofschneider received 4,900 votes and incumbent governor Benigno Fitial received 4,892 votes, therefore both advanced to the runoff election slated for November 23, 2009. A total of 13,784 votes were cast in the first round. Hofschneider led Fitial by just eight votes, the closest gubernatorial election in the history of the Northern Mariana Islands. Independent candidates Juan Pan Guerrero and Ramon "Kumoi" Deleon Guerrero came in 3rd and 4th place respectively and, therefore, did not qualify for the second runoff election.

Under a 2009 law signed by Governor Benigno Fitial, a runoff election is required within fourteen days of the if no candidate obtained 50% of the popular vote plus 1. Since neither Fitial nor Hofschneider garnered more than 50% of the vote, a runoff date was set for November 23, 2009.

=== Runoff ===
The Commonwealth Election Commission certified the results of the general election on November 9 and set the date of the runoff election between Fitial and Hofschneider for Monday, November 23. In a November 17 memorandum, Governor Fitial declared November 23 a legal holiday in the Northern Mariana Islands to encourage voter turnout.

The candidates qualifying for the runoff on November 23, 2009, were incumbent Covenant Party Governor Benigno Fitial and Republican candidate, Rep. Heinz Hofschneider. The incumbent ticket of Fitial-Inos campaigned for re-election on a theme of "proven leadership and proven experience," while the rival Hofscneider-Palacios campaign advocated a "change in leadership" to voters.

Both the Fitial and Hofschneider campaigns reached out to supporters of the independent candidates who did not qualify for the November 23rd runoff, Juan "Pan" Tenorio Guerrero and Ramon "Kumoi" Deleon Guerrero. The support of these independent voters was considered vital both Fitial's and Hofschneider's candidacies.

Former independent candidate Juan "Pan" Guerrero declined to endorse either Fitial or Hofschneider in one-page statement released on November 13, 2009. Instead, Guerrero, who came in third in the gubernatorial election, called on CNMI voters, especially his supporters, to support the candidate who best "represents a better future for themselves, their families, and the Commonwealth." Guerrero further elaborated that, "As soon as it was clear that I would not be in the runoff election, I urged supporters to make their own choices about whom to support-Ben and Eloy or Heinz and Arnold." In his statement, Guerrero noted that he make no further public statements concerning the election before the runoff.

Guerrero's running mate in the 2009 election, Joe Camacho, issued his own statement on November 12 endorsing the Covenant Party ticket of Governor Benigno Fitial and Lt. Governor Eloy Inos for re-election. Camacho's brother, Clyde Norita, who was the chairman for the executive committee to Elect Juan Guerrero and Joe Camacho, also endorsed Fitial and Inos.

Former independent candidate Ramon "Kumoi" Deleon Guerrero, who came in fourth place in the general election, endorsed Heinz Hofschneider and Arnold Palacios for governor and lt. governor. Deleon Guerrero cited the wishes of his supporters and support for reforms advocated by Hofschneider, as well as alleged broken promises by the Fitial administration, for his endorsement. He further cited similarities between his own campaign and Hofschneider's messages, "Hofschneider and Palacios have whole-heartedly embraced these visions. They have even taken to heart, our campaign theme of "Time For Change." Deleon Guerrero stated that Fitial had failed to deliver on a number of promises during his term in office, such as economic growth, improved healthcare and the removal of fuel surcharges.

However, Deleon Guerrero's running mate, former Education Commissioner David Borja, endorsed Governor Fitial for re-election. Fitial was also endorsed by the Deleon Guerrero-Borja campaign chairman, Rudy R. Sablan, and seven other senior members of the campaign team.

On December 8, after all ballots had been counted, Fitial was declared the victor in the runoff. He and Inos received 6,610 votes, while Hofschneider and Palacios received 6,240 votes.

=== Results ===
Northern Mariana Islands Gubernatorial Election
Party	Candidate	Running mate	First round		Second round	
Party	Candidate	Running mate	Votes	%	Votes	%
Covenant	Benigno Repeki Fitial (incumbent)	Eulogio "Eloy" Songao Inos (incumbent)	4,892	36.14%	6,610	51.44%
Republican	Heinz Sablan Hofschneider	Arnold Indalecio Palacios	4,900	36.20%	6,240	48.56%
Independent	Juan "Pan" Tenorio Guerrero	Joseph James Norita Camacho	2,643	19.53%		
Independent	Ramon "Kumoi" Santos Deleon Guerrero	David Muna Borja	1,101	8.13%		
Total			13,536	100%	12,850	100%
Covenant hold						

== Northern Mariana Islands Commonwealth Legislature ==
=== Results summary ===
Parties	House Election Results		Seat Change	Party Strength
Parties	2007	2009	+/−	Strength
Republican	12	9	3 ▼	45.00%
Covenant	4	7	3 ▲	35.00%
Independent	3	4	1 ▲	20.00%
Democratic	1	0	1 ▼	0.00%
Totals	20	20	Steady	100.00%

Parties	Senate Election Results		Seat Change	Party Strength
Parties	2007	2009	+/−	Strength
Republican	2	5	3 ▲	55.56%
Independent	3	4	1 ▲	44.44%
Covenant	3	0	3 ▼	0.00%
Democratic	1	0	1 ▼	0.00%
Totals	9	9	Steady	100.00%

=== Senate ===
The Northern Mariana Islands Senate is the upper house of the Northern Mariana Islands Commonwealth Legislature, consisting of nine senators representing three senatorial districts (Saipan & the Northern Islands, Tinian & Aguijan, and Rota), each a Multi-member district with three senators. Six seats in the Northern Mariana Islands Senate were up for 2009 election. Before the 2009 election, the Senate was controlled by the Covenant Party in a coalition with the Democrats and a lone independent.

Rota 1st Senatorial District (2 seats)
Party	Candidate	Votes	%
Independent	Jovita Maratita Taimanao	578	24.03%
Independent	Juan Manglona Ayuyu	544	22.62%
Independent	Joey Anthony Quitugua	489	20.33%
Independent	Paterno Songao Hocog	436	18.13%
Independent	Norbert Hocog Mundo	215	8.94%
Independent	Calista Taimanao Pendergrass	143	5.95%
Total votes		2,405	100.00%

Tinian 2nd Senatorial District (2 seats)
Party	Candidate	Votes	%
Republican	Francisco Quichuchu Cruz	698	28.51%
Republican	Jude Untalan Hofschneider (incumbent)	637	26.02%
Covenant	Joaquin Hoashi Borja	564	23.04%
Covenant	Joseph Masga Mendiola (incumbent)	549	22.43%
Total votes		2,448	100.00%

Saipan & Northern Islands 3rd Senatorial District (2 seats)
Party	Candidate	Votes	%
Republican	Ralph Deleon Guerrero Torress	4,792	24.22%
Republican	Pete Pangelinan Reyes (incumbent)	3,269	16.52%
Covenant	Jacinta Matagolai Kaipat	2,947	14.90%
Democratic	Justo Songao Quitugua	2,781	14.06%
Independent	Christina Marie Sablan	2,430	12.28%
Covenant	Ana Sablan Teregeyo	1,768	8.94%
Independent	Paul William Camacho	967	4.89%
Independent	Gregorio Sanchez Cruz	829	4.19%
Total votes		19,783	100.00%

=== House of Representative ===
All 20 seats in the Northern Mariana Islands House of Representatives were contested in the election. The house has seven districts and five of the seven are Multi-member district. Before the 2009 election, the Republican Party controlled the 20-member House of Representatives with a 12-seat majority.

House of Representative - District 1: Saipan (6 seats)
Party	Candidate	Votes	%
Republican	Diego Tenorio Benavente (incumbent)	2,028	11.93%
Covenant	Froilan Cruz "Lang" Tenorio	1,671	9.83%
Republican	Joseph Pinaula Deleon Guerrero (incumbent)	1,634	9.61%
Republican	Antonio Pangelinan Sablan	1,498	8.81%
Republican	Joseph Mafnas Palacios	1,494	8.79%
Republican	Eliceo Diaz Cabrera	1,485	8.73%
Republican	Janet Ulloa Maratita	1,413	8.31%
Independent	Victoria Tudela Guerrero	1,127	6.63%
Independent	Raymond Ulloa Palacios	1,126	6.62%
Covenant	Vicente Camacho Cabrera	993	5.84%
Covenant	Benjamin Matagolai Cepeda	918	5.40%
Covenant	Antonia Manibusan Tudela	852	5.01%
Covenant	Canice Kaipat Taitano	764	4.49%
Total votes		17,003	100.00%

House of Representative - District 2: Saipan (2 seats)
Party	Candidate	Votes	%
Covenant	Raymond Demapan Palacios (incumbent)	494	27.07%
Covenant	Rafael Sablan Demapan	381	20.88%
Republican	Eric Benavente Atalig	347	19.01%
Republican	Manuel Agulto Tenorio	323	17.70%
Independent	Ramon Benavente Aldan	155	8.49%
Independent	Henry Ayuyu Torres	125	6.85%
Total votes		1,825	100.00%

House of Representative - District 3: Saipan (6 seats)
Party	Candidate	Votes	%
Republican	Ramon Angailen Tebuteb (incumbent)	1,221	9.08%
Republican	Ray Naraja Yumul (incumbent)	1,197	8.90%
Republican	Francisco Santos Dela Cruz (incumbent)	1,151	8.56%
Covenant	Felicidad Taman Ogumoro	1,140	8.48%
Covenant	Edmund Joseph Sablan Villagomez	1,079	8.03%
Independent	Stanley Estanislao Tudela McGinnis Torres (incumbent)	1,078	8.02%
Covenant	Jesus Mareham Elameto	957	7.12%
Covenant	David Reyes Maratita	901	6.70%
Independent	Miguel Atalig Camacho	874	6.50%
Covenant	Henry Kaipat Rabauliman	864	6.43%
Independent	Rita Camacho Chong-Dela Cruz	818	6.08%
Republican	Ramon Sablan Salas	799	5.94%
Republican	Daniel Jr. Iwashita Aquino	721	5.36%
Republican	Jesus Manibusan Castro	644	4.79%
Total votes		13,444	100.00%

House of Representative - District 4: Saipan (2 seats)
Party	Candidate	Votes	%
Covenant	Sylvestre Ilo Iguel	618	23.69%
Independent	George Norita Camacho	554	21.23%
Republican	Juan Reyes Babauta	504	19.32%
Covenant	Thomas Jesus Camacho	480	18.40%
Republican	Francisco Deleon Guerrero Camacho	453	17.36%
Total votes		2,609	100.00%

House of Representative - District 5: Saipan (2 seats)
Party	Candidate	Votes	%
Independent	Frederick Peters Deleon Guerrero	775	21.97%
Covenant	Ramon Sablan Basa	664	18.83%
Democratic	Jesse David Jones Torres	514	14.57%
Republican	Jose Sabalan Demapan	450	12.76%
Republican	Rosemond Blanco Santos (incumbent)	415	11.77%
Covenant	Daniel Ogo Quitugua	409	11.60%
Independent	Joseph Muna Mendiola	172	4.88%
Democratic	Willie Lee Brundidge Jr.	128	3.63%
Total votes		3,527	100.00%

House of Representative - District 6: Tinian (1 seats)
Party	Candidate	Votes	%
Republican	Trenton Brian Conner	651	54.20%
Covenant	Edwin Palacios Aldan (incumbent)	550	45.80%
Total votes		1,201	100.00%
Republican gain from Covenant			

House of Representative - District 7: Rota (1 seats)
Party	Candidate	Votes	%
Independent	Teresita Apatang Santos	695	53.50%
Independent	Ross Hugh Songao Manglona	604	46.50%
Total votes		1,299	100.00%
Independent hold			

== Mayors ==
All four mayoral posts were up for election across the Commonwealth.

There were nine candidates for mayor on the island of Saipan: Republican Donald Flores, who won the election, as well as Covenant candidate Marian Tudela, Democrat Angelo Villagomez, and Independent candidates Candy Taman, Joe Sanchez, Roman Benavente, Juan Demapan, Tony Camacho and Lino Tenorio.

Mayor - Saipan
Party	Candidate	Votes	%
Republican	Donald Glenn Flores	2,392	22.68%
Independent	Marian Deleon Guerrero Tudela	1,620	15.36%
Democratic	Angelo O'Connor Villagomez	1,612	15.29%
Independent	Roman Cepeda Benavente	1,586	15.04%
Independent	Lino Sablan Tenorio	1,527	14.48%
Independent	Antonio Muna Camacho	571	5.41%
Independent	Jose Deleon Guerrero Sanchez (incumbent)	530	5.03%
Independent	Candido Babauta Taman	420	3.98%
Independent	Juan Sablan Demapan	287	2.72%
Total votes		10,545	100.00%
Republican gain from Covenant			

Mayor - Tinian & Aquiguan
Party	Candidate	Votes	%
Republican	Ramon Muna Dela Cruz	696	55.19%
Covenant	Jose Pangelinan Borja San Nicolas	565	44.81%
Total votes		1,261	100.00%
Republican gain from Covenant			

Mayor - Rota
Party	Candidate	Votes	%
Independent	Melchor Atalig Mendiola	547	39.47%
Independent	Victor Borja Hocog	498	35.93%
Independent	Steve King Mesngon	341	24.60%
Total votes		1,386	100.00%
Independent gain from Covenant			

Mayor - Northern Islands
Party	Candidate	Votes	%
Independent	Tobias Dela Cruz Aldan	69	50.36%
Covenant	Ramona Taisakan Rebuenog	68	49.64%
Total votes		137	100.00%
Independent win (new seat)			

== Municipal Council ==
Municipal Council - Saipan & Northern Islands
Party	Candidate	Votes	%
Nonpartisan	Ramon Jose Blas Camacho (incumbent)	6,343	54.29%
Nonpartisan	Eric Demapan Diaz	5,341	45.71%
Total votes		11,684	100.00%

Municipal Council - Tinian & Aguiguan
Party	Candidate	Votes	%
Nonpartisan	Patrick A. Manglona	701	18.88%
Nonpartisan	Esteven Pangelinan Cabrera	675	18.18%
Nonpartisan	Joseph San Nicolas Cruz	627	16.89%
Nonpartisan	Ignacio Pangelinan Aquiningoc	596	16.05%
Nonpartisan	Eugenio Henry Lizama Villagomez (incumbent)	571	15.38%
Nonpartisan	Eric Henry Cruz San Nicolas	543	14.62%
Total votes		3,713	100.00%

Municipal Council - Rota (non-partisan)
Party	Candidate	Votes	%
Nonpartisan	Arvin Cabrera Ogo	657	17.91%
Nonpartisan	George Ogo Hocog	511	13.93%
Nonpartisan	Prudencio Atalig Manglona	459	12.51%
Nonpartisan	Brian Manglona Mendiola	405	11.04%
Nonpartisan	Vicente Mesngon Rosario	396	10.79%
Nonpartisan	Gardner Trazan Delos Santos Barcinas	289	7.88%
Nonpartisan	Alfred Maratita Jr. Apatang (incumbent)	263	7.17%
Nonpartisan	Eusebio Mendiola Manglona	254	6.92%
Nonpartisan	Vincent Robert Castro Hocog	190	5.18%
Nonpartisan	Brelinda Atalig Taimanao	168	4.58%
Nonpartisan	John Cabrera Taisacan	77	2.10%
Total votes		3,669	100.00%

== Board of education ==
Board of Education - Saipan & Northern Islands (4D) (non-partisan)
Party	Candidate	Votes	%
Nonpartisan	Herman Tenorio Guerrero	7,625	100.00%
Total votes		7,625	100.00%

Board of Education - Tinian & Aguiguan (non-partisan)
Party	Candidate	Votes	%
Nonpartisan	Lucia Linda Blanco-Maratita	641	52.28%
Nonpartisan	James Masga Mendiola	585	47.72%
Total votes		1,226	100.00%

== Referendums ==
=== Education system ===
Do you approve of House Legislative Initiative 15-3 to amend Article XV, Section 1(c) and (e) of the Constitution of the Northern Mariana Islands to one member being a high school student – one member selected by the teachers within the Public School System – the selection process of a public school teacher representative shall be established by law – the elected board members shall be limited to two terms – and the public elementary and secondary education system shall be guaranteed an annual budget of not less than 15 percent of the general revenues of the Commonwealth through an annual appropriation?

Original text	Proposed text
c) The board of education shall have five members, elected at large on a non-partisan basis as follows: one from the first senatorial district, one from the second senatorial district and three from the third senatorial district. Elected members of the board of education shall serve terms of four years except that the terms of the first members elected shall be determined by drawing of lots with three members serving a term of four years and two members serving a term of two years. The governor shall appoint three nonvoting ex officio members to the board of education: one member shall be a student attending a public school; one member shall be a representative of nonpublic schools; and one member selected by an exclusive bargaining representative of the teachers within the Department of Education Public School System. Elected members of the board shall serve commencing on the second Monday of January in the year following the regular general election at which they were elected.	c) The board of education shall have five members, elected at large on a non-partisan basis as follows: one from the first senatorial district, one from the second senatorial district and three from the third senatorial district. Elected members of the board of education shall serve terms of four years except that the terms of the first members elected shall be determined by drawing of lots with three members serving a term of four years and two members serving a term of two years. The governor shall appoint three nonvoting ex officio members to the board of education: one member shall be a high school student attending a public school; one member shall be a representative of nonpublic schools; and one member selected by the teachers within the Public School System. The selection process of a public school teacher representative shall be established by law. Elected members of the board shall serve commencing on the second Monday of January in the year following the regular general election at which they were elected. The elected board members shall be limited to two terms.
e) The public elementary and secondary education system shall be guaranteed an annual budget of not less than fifteen percent of the general revenues of the Commonwealth. The budgetary appropriation may not be reprogrammed for other purposes, and any unencumbered fund balance at the end of a fiscal year shall be available for reappropriation.	e) The public elementary and secondary education system shall be guaranteed an annual budget of not less than fifteen percent of the general revenues of the Commonwealth through an annual appropriation. The budgetary appropriation may not be reprogrammed for other purposes, and any unencumbered fund balance at the end of a fiscal year shall be available for reappropriation.

=== Results ===
Referendum Questions	For		Against		Total votes	Registered voters	Turnout
Referendum Questions	Votes	%	Votes	%	Total votes	Registered voters	Turnout
Do you approve of House Legislative Initiative 15–3 to amend Article XV, Section 1(c) and (e) of the Constitution of the Northern Mariana Islands to one member being a high school student - one member selected by the teachers within the Public School System - the selection process of a public school teacher representative shall be established by law - the elected board members shall be limited to two terms - and the public elementary and secondary education system shall be guaranteed and annual budget of not less and fifteen percent of the general revenue of the Commonwealth through and annual appropriation?	6,408	59.27%	4,404	40.73%	10,812	16,146	66.96%
Do you approve of House Legislative Initiative 16–11 to amend Article III, Section 9(a) of the Constitution of the Northern Mariana Islands to prohibit the withdrawal of any funds from the General Fund except by appropriations made by law Article XV, Section 2(a) of the Constitution of the Northern Mariana Islands?	6,309	58.67%	4,444	41.33%	10,753	16,146	66.60%
Do you approve of the proposed local law by popular initiative, entitled the "Open Government Act of 2007", to amend 1 CMC §9913 to read a follows: "§9913, Legislative Branch: Applicability. The Commonwealth Legislature, including all Commonwealth legislators and the Legislative Bureau, shall be subjected to 1 CMC §9901, et seq. The respective rules and procedures of the Senate, the House of Representatives, and the Legislative Bureau shall be in compliance with this Chapter."	7,330	68.61%	3,354	31.39%	10,684	16,146	66.17%
Do you approve of Senate Legislative Initiative 16–11 to amend Article VIII, Section 1 of the Constitution of the Northern Mariana Islands to hold regular general elections only in even-numbered years?	6,160	57.07%	4,634	42.93%	10,794	16,146	66.85%
