= 2009 United States gubernatorial elections =

- November 3 and 7, 2009

3 governorships 2 states; 1 territory
	Majority party	Minority party
Party	Democratic	Republican
Seats before	28 (Note: Republican governor of Arizona Jan Brewer assumed office after Democratic governor Janet Napolitano resigned to become Secretary of Homeland Security.)	22
Seats after	26	24
Seat change	▼2	▲2
Popular vote	1,906,681	2,338,096
Percentage	43.25%	53.03%
Seats up	2	0
Seats won	0	2
- Map of the results Republican gain Covenant hold No election

United States gubernatorial elections were held on November 3, 2009, in the states of New Jersey and Virginia, as well as in the U.S. commonwealth of the Northern Mariana Islands on November 7, 2009. Both state governorships were previously held by Democrats elected in 2005, and both were won by Republicans in 2009; the local Covenant Party maintained control of the governorship of the Marianas. These elections formed part of the 2009 United States elections.

Due to the passage of Senate Legislative Initiative 16–11, this was the last year in the Commonwealth of the Northern Mariana Islands in which a gubernatorial election occurred on a pre-midterm, off-year election year, as the next gubernatorial election would be in 2014.

The Democrats held 28 governorships, while the Republicans held 22. In this election, both U.S. governorships up for election were held by Democrats, while the governorship of the Northern Mariana Islands was held by the Covenant Party. In New Jersey, incumbent governor Jon Corzine ran for re-election on a second term, but lost to Republican challenger, former United States Attorney for the District of New Jersey Chris Christie. In Virginia, incumbent Tim Kaine, who was term-limited, was succeeded by Bob McDonnell.

This was the last election in which the Democrats held a majority of governorships until 2026.

== Election predictions ==
Several sites and individuals publish predictions of competitive seats. These predictions look at factors such as the strength of the incumbent (if the incumbent is running for re-election), the strength of the candidates, and the partisan leanings of the state (reflected in part by the state's Cook Partisan Voting Index rating). The predictions assign ratings to each state, with the rating indicating the predicted advantage that a party has in winning that seat.

Most election predictors use:

- "tossup": no advantage
- "tilt" (used by some predictors): advantage that is not quite as strong as "lean"
- "lean": slight advantage
- "likely": significant, but surmountable, advantage
- "safe" or "solid": near-certain chance of victory

State	PVI	Incumbent	Last race	IE Oct 26, 2009	Result
New Jersey	D+4	Jon Corzine	53.47% D	Tossup	Christie; 48.46% R (flip)
Virginia	R+2	Tim Kaine (term-limited)	51.72% D	Lean R (flip)	McDonnell; 58.61% R (flip)

== Race summary ==
=== States ===
State	Incumbent	Party	First elected	Result	Candidates
New Jersey	Jon Corzine	Democratic	2005	Incumbent lost re-election. New member elected. Republican gain.	▌ ✓ Chris Christie (Republican) 48.5%; ▌Jon Corzine (Democratic) 44.9%; ▌Chris Daggett (Independent) 5.8%
Virginia	Tim Kaine	Democratic	2005	Incumbent term-limited. New member elected. Republican gain.	▌ ✓ Bob McDonnell (Republican) 58.6%; ▌Creigh Deeds (Democratic) 41.3%

=== Territory ===
Territory	Incumbent	Party	First elected	Result	Candidates
Northern Mariana Islands	Benigno Fitial	Covenant	2005	Incumbent re-elected.	▌ ✓ Benigno Fitial (Covenant) 51.4%; ▌Heinz Hofschneider (Republican) 48.6%

== Closest races ==
States where the margin of victory was under 5%:

1. Northern Mariana Islands, 2.8%
2. New Jersey, 4.3%

Red denotes states won by Republicans. Green denotes states won by Covenants.

== New Jersey ==
2009 New Jersey gubernatorial election
- November 3, 2009
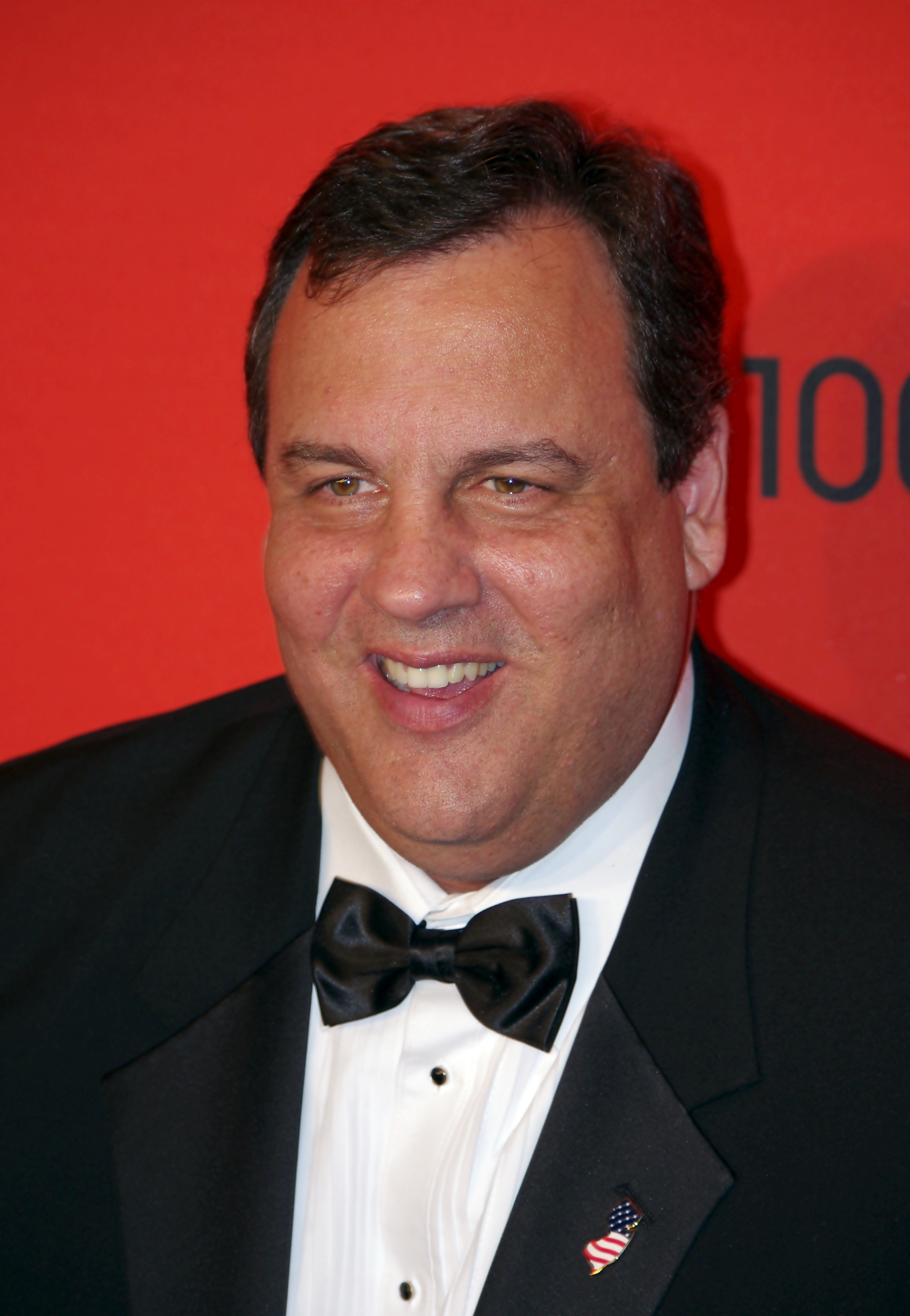

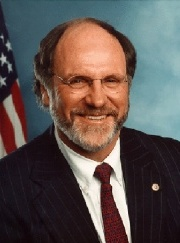

Nominee	Chris Christie	Jon Corzine	Chris Daggett
Party	Republican	Democratic	Independent
Running mate	Kim Guadagno	Loretta Weinberg	Frank J. Esposito
Popular vote	1,174,445	1,087,731	139,579
Percentage	48.5%	44.9%	5.8%
- County results
Governor before election
Jon Corzine
Democratic
Elected Governor
Chris Christie
Republican

Democratic Governor Jon Corzine was eligible to run for a second term and did so. He was considered vulnerable given a number of recent scandals and low approval ratings. Former Glen Ridge Mayor Carl Bergmanson, failed 2008 congressional candidate Roger Bacon, and failed 2008 Senate candidate Jeff Boss also sought the Democratic nomination. Corzine won the Democratic primary on June 2.

U.S. Attorney Chris Christie was the Republican gubernatorial nominee. Christie defeated former Bogota Mayor Steve Lonegan and veteran General Assemblyman Rick Merkt in the Republican primary on June 2.

Chris Daggett, who was Commissioner of the New Jersey Department of Environmental Protection under Governor Thomas Kean and regional administrator of the Environmental Protection Agency under President Ronald W. Reagan, ran as an independent. Daggett raised enough money to file for public funds and appear in both debates.

On November 3, 2009, Republican Christie unseated Democratic incumbent Governor Corzine. His margin of victory was 49% to 45%. Daggett's role as a "spoiler candidate" (some polls had him taking 10 percent of the vote) never materialized.

New Jersey election
Party	Candidate	Votes	%
Republican	Chris Christie	1,174,445	48.46
Democratic	Jon Corzine (incumbent)	1,087,731	44.88
Independent	Chris Daggett	139,579	5.76
Libertarian	Kenneth Kaplan	4,830	0.20
Independent	Gary T. Steele	3,585	0.15
Independent	Jason Cullen	2,869	0.12
Independent	David R. Meiswinkle	2,598	0.11
Independent	Kostas Petris	2,563	0.11
Socialist	Greg Pason	2,085	0.09
Independent	Gary Stein	1,625	0.07
Independent	Joshua Leinsdorf	1,021	0.04
Independent	Alvin Lindsay	753	0.03
Total votes		2,423,684	100.00
Republican gain from Democratic			

== Virginia ==
2009 Virginia gubernatorial election
- November 3, 2009
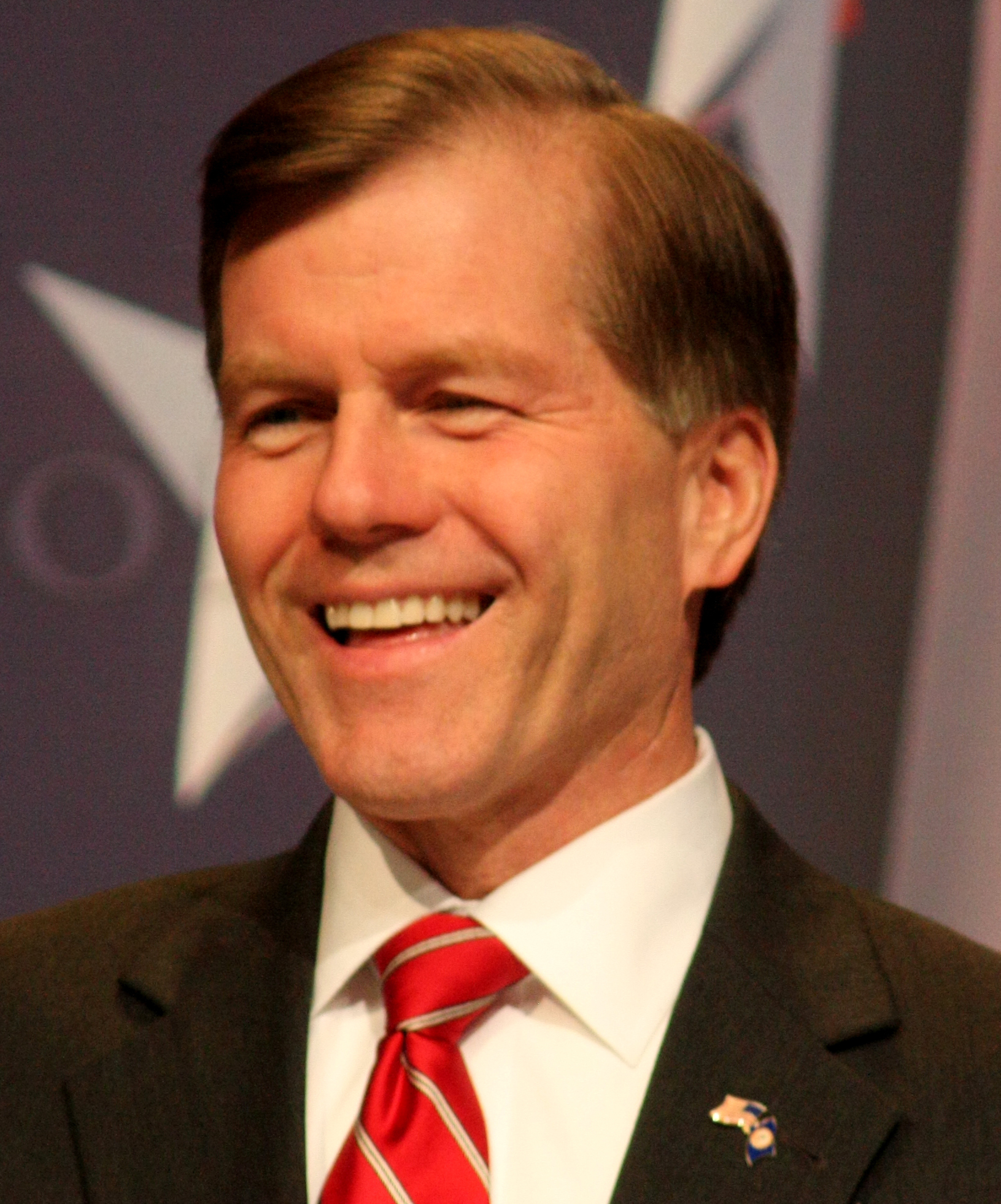

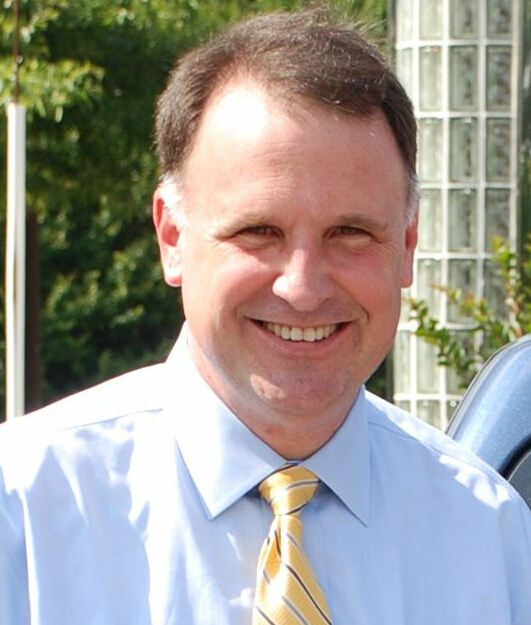
Nominee	Bob McDonnell	Creigh Deeds
Party	Republican	Democratic
Popular vote	1,163,651	818,950
Percentage	58.6%	41.2%
- County and independent city results
Governor before election
Tim Kaine
Democratic
Elected Governor
Bob McDonnell
Republican

Virginia's term limits law allows governors to run for more than one term; however, the terms cannot be consecutive. Thus, incumbent governor Tim Kaine could not stand for re-election.

Candidates for the Democratic nomination included Terry McAuliffe, former chairman of the Democratic National Committee and Hillary Clinton's former campaign manager; State Senator Creigh Deeds; and State Delegate Brian Moran. Deeds won the Democratic primary on June 9, 2009, with approximately 49% of the vote, beating out Terry McAliffe with 26% and Brian Moran with 23%.

The Republican nominee was Virginia Attorney General Bob McDonnell. This was the sixth consecutive Virginian gubernatorial election where an elected Attorney General has run.

On November 3, 2009, Bob McDonnell defeated Creigh Deeds to become governor-elect of Virginia. His margin of victory was a landslide 59% to 41%.

Virginia election
Party	Candidate	Votes	%
Republican	Bob McDonnell	1,163,651	58.61
Democratic	Creigh Deeds	818,950	41.25
Write-in		2,502	0.12
Total votes		1,985,103	100.00
Republican gain from Democratic			

== Territory ==
=== Northern Mariana Islands ===
2009 Northern Mariana Islands gubernatorial election
- November 7, 2009 (general); November 23, 2009 (runoff)
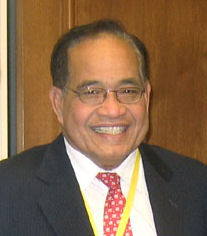

Nominee	Benigno Fitial	Heinz Hofschneider
Party	Covenant	Republican
First round	4,892; 36.2%	4,900; 36.3%
Runoff	6,610; 51.4%	6,240; 48.6%
Candidate	Juan Pan Guerrero	Ramon Deleon Guerrero
Party	Independent	Independent
First round	2,613; 19.3%	1,075; 8.0%
Runoff	Eliminated	Eliminated
- Results by voting district: Benigno Fitial: 50–55% 55–60% 65–70% Heinz Hofschneider: 50–55%
Governor before election
Benigno Fitial
Covenant
Elected Governor
Benigno Fitial
Covenant

Governor Benigno R. Fitial, a member of the local Covenant Party, was eligible to run for a second term and did so. Rep. Heinz Hofschneider won the Republican nomination in June, defeating former Republican Governor Juan N. Babauta, who was defeated in his 2005 re-election by Fitial. Ramon "Kumoi" Guerrero and Juan "Pan" Guerrero, two former members of the Northern Mariana Islands Senate, both ran as independents.

The CNMI election was held on Saturday, November 7, 2009. No candidate received a majority, so Governor Fital and Rep. Hofschneider advanced to a runoff election on November 23. Fital won with a 370-vote margin.

Northern Mariana Islands election
Party	Candidate	Votes	%
Republican	Heinz Hofschneider	4,900	36.27
Covenant	Benigno Fitial (incumbent)	4,892	36.21
Independent	Juan Pan Guerrero	2,613	19.34
Independent	Ramon Deleon Guerrero	1,075	7.96
Total votes		13,480	100.00

Northern Mariana Islands runoff election
Party	Candidate	Votes	%
Covenant	Benigno Fitial (incumbent)	6,610	51.44
Republican	Heinz Hofschneider	6,240	48.56
Total votes		12,850	100.00
Covenant hold			
