= Senator Guerrero =

Senator Guerrero may refer to:

- Alberto Guerrero Martínez (1884–1941), Senate of Ecuador
- Edith DeLeon Guerrero (fl. 2020s), Senate of Guam
- Juan Pan Guerrero (born 1949), Senate of the Northern Mariana Islands
- Lou Leon Guerrero (born 1950), Senate of Guam
- Lorenzo Guerrero (1900–1981), Senate of Nicaragua
- Lorenzo I. De Leon Guerrero (1935–2006), Senate of the Northern Mariana Islands
- Manuel Flores Leon Guerrero (1914–1985), Senate of Guam
- Ramon Deleon Guerrero (1946–2018), Senate of the Northern Mariana Islands
