= Ben Jones (politician) =

LG-elect of CNIM

Lieutenant Governor of the Northern Mariana Islands
- Elect
- Assuming office January 2027
- Governor: Ralph Torres (elect)
- Succeeding: Dennis C. Mendiola

Personal details
- Born: Benjamin Mendiola Jones Jr.
- Party: Republican
- Education: Northern Marianas College (AA); University of Hawaii, Manoa (BS, MS)

Benjamin Mendiola Jones Jr. is the Republican elected in the 2026 election for Lieutenant Governor of the Northern Mariana Islands. He has an associate's in liberal arts from Northern Marianas College as well as a bachelor's in physical education and a master's in adapted physical education from the University of Hawaii, Manoa.

Legal offices
Preceded by Dennis C. Mendiola	Lieutenant Governor of the Northern Mariana Islands; Taking office 2027	Elect
