= Senator Santos =

Senator Santos may refer to:

- Angel Santos (1959–2003), Senate of Guam
- Francis E. Santos (fl. 1990s–2010s), Senate of Guam
- Francisco R. Santos (1930–1993), Senate of Guam
- Lope K. Santos (1879–1963), Senate of the Philippines
- Teresita Santos (fl. 2010s), Senate of the Northern Mariana Islands
