= David M. Apatang =

Governor of the Northern Mariana Islands since 2025

Dave Apatang
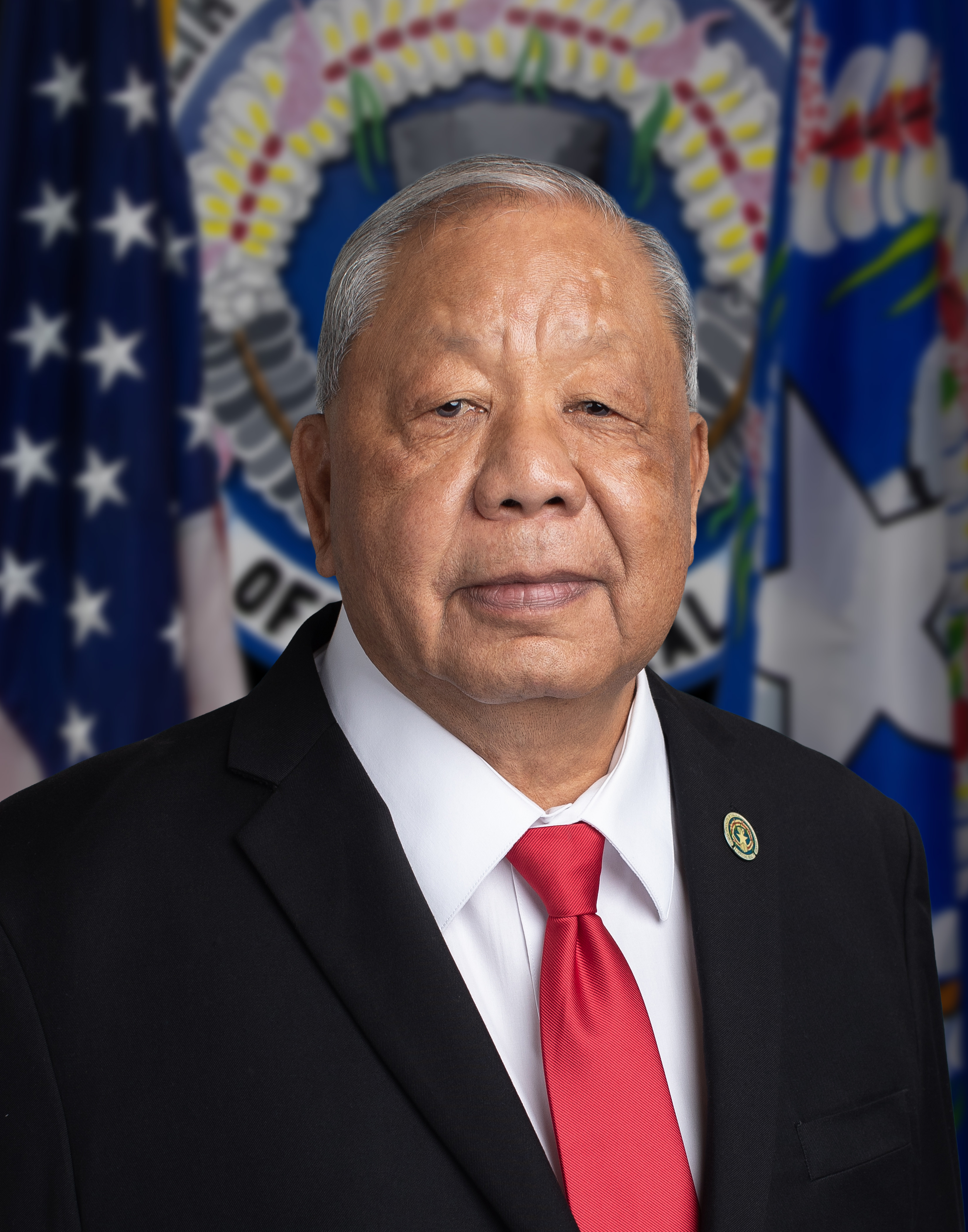
- Official portrait, 2025

11th Governor of the Northern Mariana Islands
- Incumbent
- Assumed office July 23, 2025
- Lieutenant: Dennis C. Mendiola
- Preceded by: Arnold Palacios

13th Lieutenant Governor of the Northern Mariana Islands
- In office January 9, 2023 – July 23, 2025
- Governor: Arnold Palacios
- Preceded by: Arnold Palacios
- Succeeded by: Dennis C. Mendiola

Mayor of Saipan
- In office January 12, 2015 – January 8, 2023
- Preceded by: Marian Tudela
- Succeeded by: Ramon Camacho

Personal details
- Born: David Mundo Apatang; July 10, 1948 (age 78) Guam
- Party: Republican (before 2021); Independent (2021–present)
- Spouse: Antonia Pangelinan Mafnas (died 2016)
- Education: San Francisco State University (BA)
- Website: Office website

Military service
- Allegiance: United States
- Branch/service: United States Army
- Years of service: 1967–1987
- Rank: First Sergeant

David Mundo Apatang (born July 10, 1948) is a Northern Marianan politician who has served as the 11th governor of the Northern Mariana Islands since 2025, taking office after the death of Arnold Palacios. He previously served as the 13th lieutenant governor of the Northern Mariana Islands from 2023 to 2025, and as mayor of Saipan from 2015 to 2023.

Apatang used to serve in the Northern Mariana Islands House of Representatives as a Republican. He was elected lieutenant governor of the Northern Mariana Islands in the 2022 election on an independent ticket headed by Arnold Palacios. After becoming governor following Palacios's death, in March 2026, Apatang announced he would not seek a full term in 2026. As governor, Apatang ordered a referendum on a constitutional convention on the 2026 ballot.

== Education ==
While in the Army, Apatang earned a Bachelor of Arts degree in speech and communications from San Francisco State University.

== Career ==
=== Military service ===
Apatang served in the United States Army from 1967 to 1987. A Vietnam War veteran, Apatang was stationed at various times in Vietnam; the Panama Canal Zone; Würzburg, Germany; Fort Lewis in Washington; Fort Benjamin Harrison in Indiana; and Fort Jackson in South Carolina. He ended his career at Fort Jackson and served on its courts-martial council. He retired with the rank of first sergeant in 1987.

Following his military service, Apatang served in local government. He served seven consecutive terms in the Northern Mariana Islands House of Representatives.

=== Commonwealth Legislature ===
Atapang was elected to the Northern Mariana Islands House of Representatives in the 1995 general election. He was the second highest vote-getter in Saipan's Precinct 1. Apatang ran for the Senate in 2001 on behalf of the Covenant Party in the Northern Mariana Islands Senate's 3rd district. In the 2005 gubernatorial election, Apatang ran for Lieutenant Governor as the running mate of Heinz Hofschneider. While both Hofschneider and Apatang were Republicans, they ran as independents. In a four-way race, the Hofschneider–Apatang ticket lost to Benigno Fitial and Timothy Villagomez of the Covenant Party by a single point.

=== Mayor of Saipan ===
Shortly after the death of Donald Flores, the mayor of Saipan, Apatang announced his candidacy for the position. Apatang, running as an independent, defeated Republican candidate Jose Alguto Reyes and Democratic candidate Antonio Pinaula Mareham in the 2014 general election. Apatang succeeded Marian Tudela, the acting Mayor appointed after Flores's death. He was sworn in on January 12, 2015 and served two terms, ending on January 9, 2023. His wife, Antonia Pangelinan Mafnas, died in Hawaii on December 14, 2016. In 2021, the House passed a resolution to honor Apatang's 50 years of service to the people of the CNMI.

=== 2022 lieutenant gubernatorial election ===
Apatang ran as a candidate for Lieutenant Governor of the Northern Mariana Islands in the 2022 election, running on an independent ticket headed by then incumbent lieutenant governor Arnold Palacios. They won 54.14% of the votes in the second round, defeating the incumbent Republican governor and the resurgent Democratic Party candidates. Apatang was sworn into office on January 9, 2023.

=== Governorship ===
Apatang became the governor of the Northern Mariana Islands after the death of Palacios on July 23, 2025.

On March 5, 2026, Apatang expressed support for President Trump over the military actions on Iran and the assassination of Ali Khamenei, saying that Trump had done "what he needed to do." Apatang issued an executive order to include a referendum on a possible constitutional convention on the 2026 ballot.

On October 30, 2026, Apatang stated that the CNMI's fiscal crisis was not his fault. “I get hammered all the time, but it’s not my fault,” Apatang said at the end of a bill signing in his office. “Don’t blame me for that. Blame somebody else,” he said, referring to those who had been in office for six years before him and left the government “almost broke.”. He specifically referenced the money the CNMI received from IPI, as well as federal grants such as ARPA and other COVID assistance as money that was mismanaged and missing.

Political offices
Preceded by Marian Tudela	Mayor of Saipan; 2015–2023	Succeeded by Ramon Camacho
Preceded by Arnold Palacios	Lieutenant Governor of the Northern Mariana Islands; 2023–2025	Succeeded by Dennis C. Mendiola
Preceded by Arnold Palacios	Governor of the Northern Mariana Islands; 2025–present	Incumbent
