= Senator Cruz (disambiguation) =

Ted Cruz (born 1970) is a U.S. Senator from Texas since 2013.

Senator Cruz may also refer to:

- Benjamin Cruz (born 1951), Guam Senate
- Donovan Dela Cruz (born 1973), Hawaii State Senate
- Francisco Q. Cruz (fl. 2010s–present), Northern Mariana Islands Senate
- Gina Cruz Blackledge (born 1969), Senate of Mexico
- Michael Cruz (born 1958), Senate of Guam
- Nilsa Cruz-Perez (born 1961), New Jersey State Senate
