= Sixto Igisomar =

Northern Mariana politician

Sixto Kaipat Igisomar is a politician from the Northern Mariana Islands. Igisomar served in the Northern Mariana Islands Senate from November 19, 2014 to January 11, 2021.

== Executive Branch appointments ==
He was the chairman of the Commonwealth Development Authority and chairman of the NMI Retirement Fund. In 2010, Igisomar became the acting Secretary of Commerce and one year later was nominated by Governor Benigno Fitial to the position. He served in that role until being elected to the Senate. In May 2021, Governor Ralph Torres appointed Igisomar to serve as the Secretary of the Department of Public Lands. He served for the remainder of the Torres administration. Torres’ successor, Governor Arnold Palacios, appointed Igisomar to replace Teresita Santos as the Secretary for the Department of Public Lands on April 7, 2025, and as of August 28, 2025, Igisomar is serving in that role.

== Senate ==
Igisomar was nominated by the Republican Party to run for the vacancy created by the resignation of Ray Naranja Yumul. After winning the special election to succeed Yumul, Igisomar was sworn into office on November 19, 2014. He was the author of the Taulamwaar Sensible CNMI Cannabis Act of 2018 which legalized cannabis in the Northern Mariana Islands. In the 2020 general election, Democratic candidate Edith DeLeon Guerrero defeated Igisomar with 5,176 votes to Igisomar’s 4,928 votes.
