= California Coast University =

Private for-profit online university in Santa Ana, California

- Type: Private for-profit online university
- Established: 1973; 53 years ago
- President: Murl Tucker
- Students: 8,000
- Location: Santa Ana, California, United States; 33°46′44.93″N 117°52′15.39″W
- Website: www.calcoast.edu
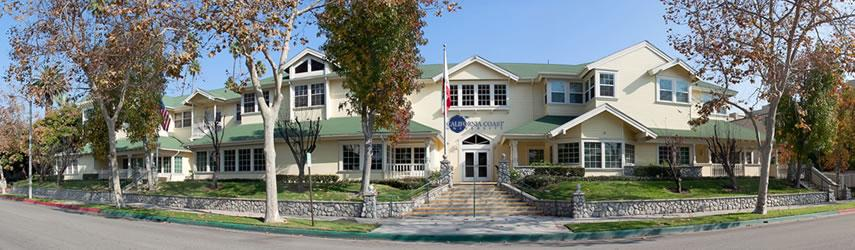

California Coast University (CCU) is a private for-profit online university based in Santa Ana, California. It is accredited by the Distance Education Accrediting Commission and approved by the State of California. It enrolls approximately 8,000 students.

== History ==
California Coast University was founded in 1973 as California Western University, with administration and library facilities located in downtown Santa Ana, California. The name was changed to California Coast University in 1981. In 2010, CCU moved to larger headquarters to accommodate its continued growth.

== Academics ==
California Coast University presently offers undergraduate and graduate programs in business administration, management, marketing, psychology, criminal justice, human resource management, health care management, and education. Academics at California Coast University are offered through five schools: School of Administration and Management, School of Arts and Sciences, School of Behavioral Science, School of Criminal Justice, and School of Education.

=== Accreditation ===
CCU was initially accredited by the Distance Education Accrediting Commission (DEAC) on January 8, 2005. DEAC accreditation recognizes the validity of CCU degrees up to doctoral level.

CCU has been approved to operate by the State of California since 1974. Approval to operate is presently granted by the California Bureau for Private Postsecondary Education (BPPE), a unit of the California Department of Consumer Affairs. The BPPE approves private postsecondary schools to operate in the state that meet "minimum standards established by the Bureau for integrity, financial stability, and educational quality."

In 2004, and prior to their DEAC accreditation, the U.S. General Accounting Office (GAO) found that federal employees had improperly received subsidies to attend CCU. The report also found that federal agencies may have incorrectly accepted CCU degrees issued before their accreditation.

=== Format and delivery ===
Since the early 1970s, California Coast University has offered off-campus self-paced degree programs to mid-career adults. Students were accepted who had verifiable years of full-time employment in the major field or a closely related field. In the 1980s, seven years of verifiable full time on the job experience were required before entering the doctoral programs. Five years of experience were required to enter the master's degree (MS) programs, and three years of experience were required to enter the baccalaureate (BS) programs. Academic approval by California required not less than nine months or one academic year to complete any degree program (a minimum of three years for the doctoral degrees). Students earn their degrees through a variety of methods including transfer credit from other recognized educational institutions, courses completed at CCU, and specialized, documented, formal training (undergraduate level only). In addition, doctoral students must complete a dissertation focused on research related to the field of education and an oral defense before their dissertation committee.

Originally, California Coast University provided distance education degrees, at the bachelor's, master's and doctoral level, for a variety of majors including business administration, management, psychology, education, and engineering management. Over time, the engineering management programs, along with the other doctoral programs, were phased out in response to a reorientation of the CCU programs in preparation for accreditation by DETC (now DEAC). Students completing programs that were discontinued could complete their degrees in a teach-out agreement with the accreditor. Teach-out agreements are a standard practice required of all recognized educational institutions. During the teach-out phase, qualified faculty continue to work with enrolled students.

Since accreditation, CCU has continued to expand and to offer more distance education programs in the areas of health care administration and management, criminal justice, human resource management, marketing, general studies, and to offer additional master's and professional doctoral degrees in education, since DEAC became authorized by US Department Of Education to accredit professional doctorates.

== Notable alumni ==
- Mohammad Hossein Adeli, diplomat, economist, academic, and Secretary General of Gas Exporting Countries Forum
- David Borja, Northern Mariana Islands educator, military veteran, and politician
- Ben Bova, science and science fiction author
- Joseph V. Cuffari, Inspector General of the Department of Homeland Security
- Cynthia Denzler, Olympic alpine skier
- Jeffrey Goodman, archaeologist
- Walter Martin, evangelical Christian minister and founder of the Christian Research Institute
- Cheryl Saban, philanthropist, advocate for women, Senior Advisor, U.S. Mission to the United Nations, and Representative of the United States to the Sixty-seventh Session of the United Nations General Assembly
- Tim Solobay, Pennsylvania politician
- Doreen Virtue New Age and later Christian writer and YouTuber
- Philip Wong Yu-hong, Hong Kong politician
