= Doreen Virtue =

American New Age author

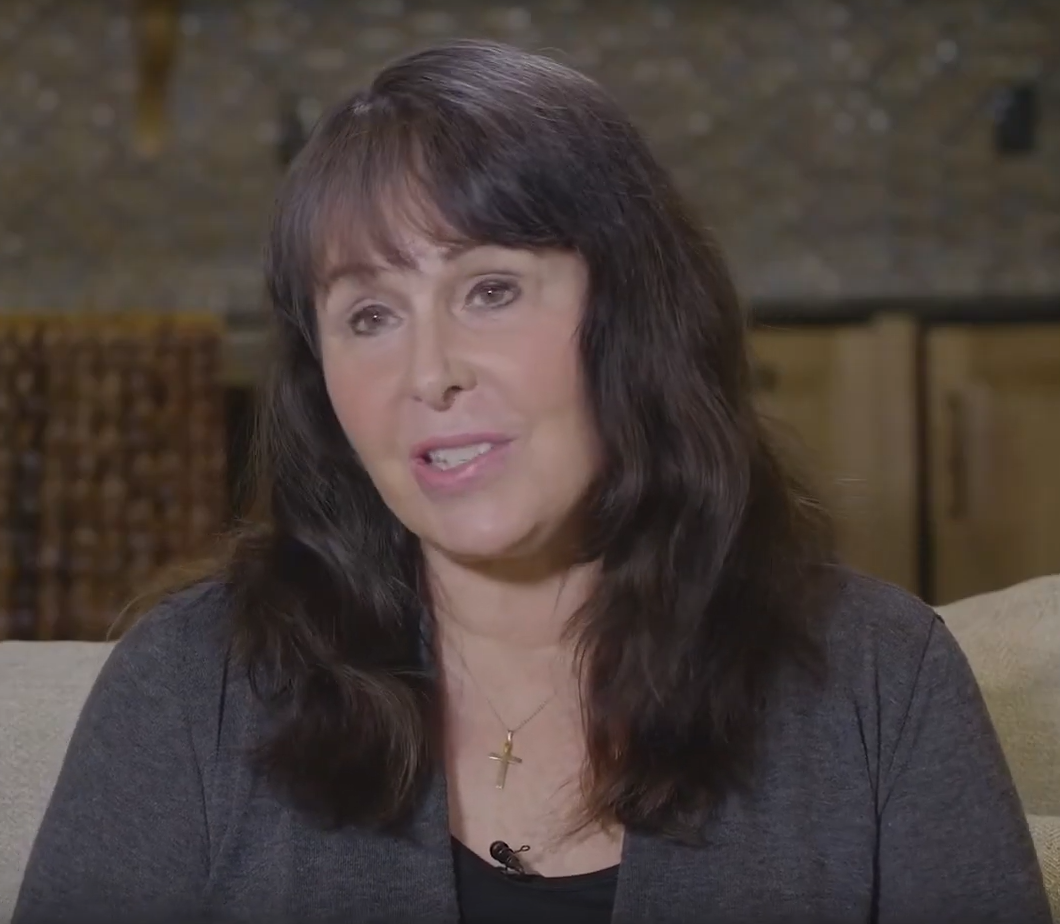
- Virtue in 2022
- Born: Doreen Hannan; April 1958 (age 68); California, United States
- Education: Chapman University (MA) California Coast University (PhD) Western Seminary (MA)
- Occupation: YouTuber
- Known for: New Age books and practices, YouTube channel
- Website: https://doreenvirtue.com/

Doreen Virtue (née Hannan, born 1958) is an American author who formerly wrote exclusively about New Age topics. Virtue has said that in 2017 she rejected her New Age beliefs and became a born-again fundamentalist Christian.

== Early life and education ==
Doreen Virtue was born Doreen Hannan in 1958 in Southern California. She spent her early childhood in North Hollywood, then moved with her family to Escondido, California, when she was 10 years old. When Virtue was growing up, she and her family practiced Christian Science and followed the teachings of Mary Baker Eddy.

Virtue earned a master's degree in counseling psychology at Chapman University, a private research university in Orange, California. Through distance learning, she later obtained a PhD in psychology from California Coast University. At the time she received the degree, the school was unaccredited.

In 2017, Virtue earned a Master's degree in Biblical and theological studies from Western Seminary in Portland, Oregon.

== Spiritual beliefs ==
=== New Age practice and writing ===
Before 1995, Virtue worked as a psychotherapist. After being the victim of a carjacking, she credited "angelic intervention" with preventing her from harm in the incident. She then closed her therapy practice and began performing tarot readings. Between 1995 and 2015, she published more than 50 books and her divination cards through Hay House, a New Age publishing company.

The primary focus of Virtue's spiritual practice was "angel spirituality", a form of New Age thought that attributes esoteric and occult qualities to Christian angelic beings. Her works drew from symbolism across several religions, including Christianity, Hinduism, Celtic mythology, and Native American spirituality.

=== Conversion to Christianity ===
In February 2017, Virtue was baptized by an Anglican priest at Kawaihae Beach, Hawaii. Later that year, she publicly announced she had renounced her New Age beliefs and embraced Christianity. She encouraged her followers and readers to do the same.

Since February 2024, Virtue has co-hosted a YouTube channel, "New Age to New Heart", with two other former New Age adherents. The three discuss their former lives in the New Age movement and current lives as Christians. The channel is also available on Spotify, Apple TV, and American Gospel TV.

Virtue also has a longtime monetized YouTube channel, "Doreen Virtue". It has 350,000 subscribers. On it, Virtue gives teachings from a fundamentalist perspective and criticizes New Age practitioners and beliefs. In addition, she speaks against Christian groups, pastors, churches, and ministries that she claims are connected to New Age beliefs and anti-Christian practices, such as Rick Warren and Steven Furtick, Sarah Young, Elevation Church, and Bethel Church. She also has criticized some Contemporary Christian Music groups and artists, and certain Christian books and devotionals. Virtue has released several videos on YouTube that strongly criticize The Chosen, a popular TV series on the life of Jesus, claiming that New Age themes and music are embedded in the storylines.

== Personal life ==
Virtue has been married five times and has two children. She and her fifth husband have lived in Washington state since moving from Hawaii in 2017.

== See also ==
- New Age § Christian perspectives
- Religious debates over the Harry Potter series
- Christian views on astrology

== Bibliography (selected) ==
=== Pre-conversion ===
- The Lightworker's Way: Awakening Your Spiritual Power to Know and Heal. Carlsbad: Hay House. 1997. ISBN 978-1-5617-0390-6.
- Messages from Your Angels: What Your Angels Want You to Know. Hay House. 2002. ISBN 978-1-4019-0049-6.
- Archangels & Ascended Masters: A Guide to Working and Healing With Divinities and Deities. Carlsbad: Hay House. 2003. ISBN 978-1-4019-0063-2.
- The Crystal Children: A Guide to the Newest Generation of Psychic and Sensitive Children. Carlsbad: Hay House. 2003. ISBN 978-1-4019-0229-2.
- Angel Numbers 101: The Meaning of 111, 123, 444, and Other Number Sequences. Carlsbad: Hay House. 2008. ISBN 978-1-4019-2001-2.
- Angels 101: An Introduction to Connecting, Working, and Healing with the Angels. Carlsbad: Hay House. 2014. ISBN 978-1-4019-4603-6.
- Divine Prescriptions: Spiritual Solutions for You and Your Loved Ones. Macmillan. 2014. ISBN 978-1-58063-216-4.

=== Post-conversion ===
- Virtue, Doreen (2018). Sweet Dreams Scripture: Bible Verses and Prayers to Calm and Soothe You. ISBN Services. ISBN 978-1-64255-933-0.
- Deceived No More: How Jesus Led Me out of the New Age and into His Word. Harper Collins Publishers. 2020. ISBN 978-0-7852-3410-4.
- Don't Let Anything Dull Your Sparkle : How to Break Free of Negativity and Drama. Carlsbad: Hay House. 2022. ISBN 978-1-7818-0412-4.
