= CNMI Cannabis Act of 2018 =

2018 bill

The CNMI Cannabis Act of 2018 is a bill introduced in the Northern Mariana Islands Commonwealth Legislature in 2017 as SB 20-62. It was introduced by Senator Sixto Igisomar and would legalize cannabis possession and consumption by adults and create a Cannabis Commission to regulate sales in the Commonwealth. Hearings on the act were held in October, 2017; a senator said it had the highest public attendance of any hearings he knew of. On May 16, 2018 (May 15 in the States), SB 20-62 had a final vote in the Commonwealth's Senate, and was passed without opposition. On May 30 (29 in the States), it passed the House Committee on Judiciary and Governmental Operations unanimously.

The act was initially fashioned like a referendum to appear as a ballot question for voters in November, 2018; that language was deleted when it was adopted by the Senate.
