= Donald M. Manglona =

Northern Mariana Islander politician

Donald Manglona

Majority Leader of the Northern Mariana Islands Senate
- Incumbent
- Assumed office January 13, 2025
- Preceded by: Corina Magofna

Vice President of the Northern Mariana Islands Senate
- In office January 9, 2023 – January 13, 2025
- Preceded by: Justo Quitugua
- Succeeded by: Karl King-Nabors

Member of the Northern Mariana Islands Senate from the 1st district
- Incumbent
- Assumed office January 9, 2023
- Preceded by: Victor Hocog; Teresita Santos

Member of the Northern Mariana Islands House of Representatives from the 7th district
- In office January 2021 – January 9, 2023
- Preceded by: Glenn Maratita
- Succeeded by: Julie Ogo

Personal details
- Born: Donald Manalang Manglona; 1988 (age 37–38)
- Party: Independent
- Education: Saint Mary's University (BBA); University of Phoenix (MEd)

Donald Manalang Manglona is a Northern Mariana Islander politician and member of the Northern Mariana Islands Senate representing the 1st district, which is coterminous with Rota. He is an independent aligned with the chamber's Republican Party Prior to being a Senator, he represented Rota in the Northern Mariana Islands House of Representatives. In the 2022 general election, Manglona successfully ran for the Northern Mariana Islands Senate. He was the top vote getter among five candidates for two seats, with the other seat going to Dennis C. Mendiola.

Northern Mariana Islands Senate
Preceded by Justo Quitugua	Vice President of Northern Mariana Islands Senate; 2023–2025	Succeeded by Karl King-Nabors
Preceded by Corina Magofna	Majority Leader of Northern Mariana Islands Senate; 2025–present	Incumbent
