= Corina Magofna =

Northern Mariana Islands politician

Vice President of the Northern Mariana Islands Senate
- Incumbent
- Assumed office July 31, 2025
- Preceded by: Karl King-Nabors

Majority Leader of the Northern Mariana Islands Senate
- In office January 9, 2023 – January 13, 2025
- Preceded by: Vinnie Sablan
- Succeeded by: Donald M. Manglona

Member of the Northern Mariana Islands Senate from the 3rd district
- Incumbent
- Assumed office January 9, 2023
- Preceded by: Justo Quitugua; Vinnie Sablan

Member of the Northern Mariana Islands House of Representatives from the 3rd district
- In office October 2021 – January 9, 2023
- Preceded by: Ivan Blanco
- Succeeded by: Marissa Flores

Personal details
- Born: Corina Lorraine Magofna
- Party: Democratic (before 2022); Independent (2022–present)
- Education: University of Hawaii, Manoa (attended); University of Phoenix (BS)

Corina Lorraine Magofna is a member of the Northern Mariana Islands Senate from Saipan. Magnofa was elected to the Northern Mariana Islands House of Representatives in a 2021 special election. Magofna was then elected to the Senate in the 2022 general election.

== Early life and career ==
Corina Lorraine Magofna has an associate degree in accounting from the University of Hawaiʻi and a bachelor's degree in Business Accounting from the University of Phoenix. For a time, she was the budget officer at the Commonwealth Utilities Corporation.

== Political career ==
In the 2020 general election, Magofna ran for the Northern Mariana Islands House of Representatives for Precinct #3. In 2021, after the death of Republican minority leader Ivan A. Blanco, the Democratic Party of the Northern Mariana Islands nominated Magofna as their candidate for the special election. Magofna defeated Republican candidate Grace “Pitu” Sablan-Vaiagae in the special election and allowed the Democratic Party to gain a full majority in the CNMI House.

In the 2022 general election, Magofna, as an independent, and Democratic candidate Celina Babauta won Saipan's two Senate seats. In the 23rd Commonwealth Legislature, Magofna serves as the floor leader for the majority and as chairwoman of the Committee on Resources, Economic Development, Programs and Gaming. During the 24th Commonwealth Legislature, at a reorganization session necessitated by the elevation of Dennis C. Mendiola to the position of lieutenant governor, Magofna was named Vice President of the Senate.

Northern Mariana Islands Senate
Preceded by Vinnie Sablan	Majority Leader of the Northern Mariana Islands Senate; 2023–2025	Succeeded by Donald M. Manglona
Preceded by Karl King-Nabors	Vice President of Northern Mariana Islands Senate; 2025–present	Incumbent
