= David Borja =

Northern Mariana Islands politician

David Muna Borja (born May 21, 1954) is a Northern Mariana Islands educator, military veteran and politician. Borja, who ran for Lieutenant Governor of the Northern Mariana Islands, was the running mate of gubernatorial candidate Ramon "Kumoi" Guerrero in the 2009 gubernatorial election.

== Biography ==
David Borja was born on May 21, 1954, to parents, Gregorio Flores and Catalina Tudela Muna Borja. The family resided in the village of San Vicente, Saipan.

=== Education ===
Borja attended Mount Carmel elementary school for grades 1-3 and Tamuning elementary school for grades 4th - 6th.

Borja graduated from John F. Kennedy High School in Tumon, Guam. He enrolled as the University of Guam from 1972 to 1975, where he received a bachelor's degree in mathematics. He enrolled at Central Michigan University from 1979 to 1980 and obtained a master's degree in management and supervision.

In 2002, Borja earned an online-only doctorate in business administration through California Coast University which he attended from 1999 until the completion of his doctoral program. In doing so, Borja became the first Chamorro from the Northern Mariana Islands to obtain a doctorate in business administration.

=== Career ===
Borja had a long career with the United States Army before he retired on July 31, 1994, with the rank of major.

Borja enlisted and completed United States Army Corps of Engineers basic training in 1977. He further completed the U.S. Army Engineer Officer Advance Course in 1981 and the U.S. Army Command and services staff school in 1984. Finally, Borja graduated from the United States Army Command and General Staff College at Fort Leavenworth in 1987.

Borja initially entered as an enlisted soldier, which was his position within the Army from December 1976 until June 1979. He served as an Army Company Commander for two years, from August 1982 until April 1984. He next became a U.S. Engineer Officer from July 1987 until July 1994. He finally served as Battalion Executive Officer from July 1992 until his retirement from the Army on July 31, 1994.

Borja refocused his career on education after his departure from the U.S. Army in 1994. He became an assistant professor of Military Science at California State University, Long Beach from July 1994 until July 1997. Simultaneously, Borja taught in the classroom at Marianas High School in Saipan from August 1994 until July 1995, and returned to the faculty of the school for a second time from September 1996 until July 2000. Between July 1995 and September 1996, Borja served as the principal of Hopwood Junior High School on Saipan.

Borja became the teacher representative to the CNMI Board of Education from 1997 until 2000, while he a faculty member at Marianas High School. In the 2000s, Borja became the Associate Commissioner of Administrative Services with the CNMI Public School System.

In 2006, Borja became the Northern Mariana Islands Public School System (PSS) education commissioner, succeeding Dr. Rita Inos. In June 2008 Borja was succeeded as education commissioner by Dr. Rita Sablan.

In March 2009, Borja was chosen by independent gubernatorial candidate Ramon "Kumoi" Guerrero to be his running mate Lieutenant Governor in the 2009 election for governor. Guerrero selected Borja from a listed of 18 possible running mates. The Guerrero-Borja ticket adopted the campaign slogan "Time for a Change!"

David Borja is married to his wife, Karen Lawson Borja. The couple have four children - Gregory Pat, Anmari Jo, Christina Gannon and Andrew Lewis.
