= Joe Camacho =

Northern Mariana Islands politician (born 1968/69)

Judge of the Northern Mariana Islands Superior Court
- Incumbent
- Assumed office November 19, 2011
- Preceded by: Ramona Villagomez Manglona

Personal details
- Born: 1968 or 1969 (age 56–57)
- Party: Republican Party
- Spouse: Ellsbeth Viola Alepuyo
- Children: One
- Education: San Jose State University (BA); Seattle University (MPA); Gonzaga University (JD)
- Profession: Judge; Politician

Joseph James Norita Camacho (born 1968 or 1969) is a politician from the Northern Mariana Islands. He is an incumbent judge on the Northern Mariana Islands Superior Court, the commonwealth's trial court, and has served there since 2011. Prior, he was a member of the Northern Mariana Islands House of Representatives.

== Biography ==
Camacho was born to parents Vicente (Ben Dinga) Tudela Camacho and Marcy Lieto Norita Camacho, both of whom are now deceased. He was raised by Torcauto Borja Tudela. Camacho's wife is Ellsbeth Viola Alepuyo. The couple have one child, Ulen Joseph Vicente Alepuyo Camacho.

== Early life and career ==
Camacho graduated from Marianas High School in June 1987. He received an Associate of Arts degree in Liberal Arts from Northern Marianas College in May 1992. In December 1994, Camacho further obtained a bachelor's degree in history from San Jose State University in California.

Camacho continued his education by earning his master's degree in public administration from Seattle University, a Jesuit institution in Washington state, in December 1998. Camacho completed his Juris Doctor at the Gonzaga University School of Law, located in Spokane, Washington, in December 2001. He worked as a pizza delivery man and a dishwasher during college.

Camacho worked as a police officer on Saipan for three years from January 1989 to August 1991.

== Political career ==
Joseph Camacho, a Republican, was elected to the Northern Mariana Islands House of Representatives in the 2007 general election. In the 2007 election, the Covenant Party lost control of the House to the Republicans. Camacho was chosen as the floor leader of the new 16th House of Representatives. He did not seek reelection in 2009.

=== Runs for higher office ===
Democrat gubernatorial candidate Juan "Pan" Guerrero approached Camacho, a Republican, in 2009 and asked him to run on his ticket for Lieutenant Governor of the Northern Mariana Islands. Camacho accepted Guerrero's offer to run as part of the Independent ticket, which he called a "partnership." The acceptance ceremony for the gubernatorial campaign took place on March 10, 2009, at Tan Marikita Café in Garapan. Camacho explained in his speech to supporters that he had weighed all his political options before agreeing to run for Lieutenant Governor with Guerrero Camacho thanked Guerrero for the opportunity, noting that Guerrero had promised to make both the campaign and a potential administration a full "partnership." The Guerrero/Camacho ticket only received 2,643 votes and came in a distant third in the polling. Camacho announced in March 2010 his intentions to run for United States Congress as a candidate for the Covenant Party.

=== Judgeship ===
In 2011, Governor Benigno Fitial appointed Camacho to the serve as a judge of the Superior Court, the trial level courts for the Northern Mariana Islands. Camacho was confirmed by the Northern Mariana Islands Senate unanimously. He was sworn in November 19, 2011, taking his oath in Carolinian. Camacho succeeded Ramona Villagomez Manglona who was appointed to serve as a judge for the United States District Court for the Northern Mariana Islands. He was retained in 2016 with 78% of the votes cast and in 2022 with 75% of the votes cast.
