= Marian Tudela =

Northern Mariana Islands politician

Mayor of Saipan
- In office June 8, 2014 – January 12, 2015
- Preceded by: Donald Flores; Ramon B. Camacho (acting)
- Succeeded by: David M. Apatang

Personal details
- Born: c. 1945

Marian Deleon Guerrero Tudela (born c. 1945) is a Northern Mariana Islands politician who served as the mayor of Saipan, the capital of the Commonwealth, from June 2014 until January 2015. She was appointed mayor of Saipan by Governor Eloy Inos to fill the unexpired term of Mayor Donald Flores following his death in office. Tudela is the first female mayor of Saipan, as well as the first woman to serve as mayor of any Northern Mariana Islands municipality in history.

== Biography ==
Before entering politics, Tudela worked for the Commonwealth of the Northern Mariana Islands Medical Referral Program's office in Honolulu, Hawaii.

In 2009, Tudela was a candidate for Mayor of Saipan as the nominee for the now defunct Covenant Party. In the crowded race, which included eight candidates, Tudela lost to the Republican mayoral candidate, Donald Flores, on November 7, 2009. Flores won the election with 2,392 votes, while Tudela came in second place with 1,620 votes.

On June 2, 2014, incumbent Saipan Mayor Donald Flores, then in his second term, died in office following a stroke. Governor Eloy Inos appointed Tudela as acting Mayor of Saipan on June 3, 2014, to serve for the remainder of Flores' unexpired term, which would end in January 2015. Ramon B. Camacho, the chairman of the Saipan and Northern Islands Municipal Council, served as acting mayor until Tudela could return from Arizona to take the oath of office. Tudela had been living in Arizona at the time of her appointment in order to take care of her great-granddaughter. Inos cited her second place finish in the 2009 mayoral election as a reason for her appointment. She promised to retain all of Flores' existing staff during her term.

After returning from the mainland United States, Marian Tudela was sworn into office on June 8, 2014, by Governor Eloy Inos during a ceremony at the Coral Ocean Point Resort. She became the first female mayor of Saipan, as well as the first female mayor of any municipality in the Northern Mariana Islands in history.

Tudela declined to run for a full term in the 2014 mayoral election later that year. She was succeeded by David M. Apatang, a Republican, who was inaugurated on January 12, 2015.

In March 2018, Tudela launched another candidacy for mayor of Saipan, intending to challenge incumbent Mayor Apatang. However, she later withdrew from the campaign and endorsed Ramon Blas "RB" Camacho for mayor of Saipan . Mayor David M. Apatang won re-election to a second term in November 2018.
