= Karl King-Nabors =

American territorial senator

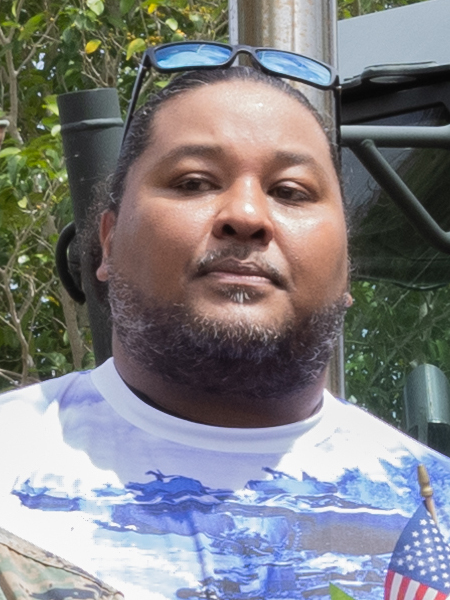
- King-Nabors in 2024

President of the Northern Mariana Islands Senate
- Incumbent
- Assumed office July 23, 2025; Acting: July 23, 2025 – July 31, 2025
- Preceded by: Dennis C. Mendiola

Vice President of the Northern Mariana Islands Senate
- In office January 13, 2025 – July 31, 2025
- Preceded by: Donald M. Manglona
- Succeeded by: Corina Magofna

Personal details
- Born: Karl Rosario King-Nabors Northern Mariana Islands
- Party: Republican
- Parents: William Nabors (father); Serafina King (mother)
- Relatives: Kimberlyn King-Hinds (sister)

Karl Rosario King-Nabors is a Republican member of the Northern Mariana Islands Senate. Following Dennis C. Mendiola's elevation to lieutenant governor, King-Nabors was named senate president after serving as acting president prior to a formal reorganization session.

== Biography ==
His parents are William Nabors, an attorney who worked on the settlement of the Micronesian War Claims, and Serafina King, who served for a time as a member of the Northern Mariana Islands House of Representatives. He attended Tinian High School. He served on Commonwealth's COVID-19 Task Force as Tinian's representative. He ran for the Northern Mariana Islands Senate in the 2020 general election against Democratic candidate Frederick Dela Cruz.

He won and succeeded fellow Republican Francisco Borja. He was the chairman of the Senate committee reviewing the House's impeachment charges against Governor Ralph Torres. He, along with the other Senate Republicans, voted in acquit Torres of the charges.

On January 8, 2025, it was announced that King-Nabors would be elected to the position of Vice President of the Senate for the 24th Commonwealth Legislature.

Northern Mariana Islands Senate
Preceded by Donald M. Manglona	Vice President of Northern Mariana Islands Senate; 2025	Succeeded by Corina Magofna
Political offices
Preceded by Dennis C. Mendiola	President of the Northern Mariana Islands Senate; 2025–present	Incumbent
