= Juan B. Tudela =

Northern Mariana Islands politician

Mayor of Saipan, Northern Mariana Islands
- In office January 1, 2002 – January 11, 2010
- Preceded by: Jose Sablan
- Succeeded by: Donald Flores

Personal details
- Born: Juan Borja Tudela; May 17, 1935 Saipan, Northern Mariana Islands, South Seas Mandate
- Died: February 2, 2013 (aged 77) Honolulu, Hawaii
- Party: Covenant (2005-2013); Democratic (until 2005)
- Spouse: Antonia Lizama Masga Tudela
- Education: University of Oklahoma Extension Courses – Dale Carnegie Courses (Management); Father Dueñas Memorial School, Guam; Saint Francis Catholic School (Yona), Guam
- Profession: Businessman, politician, educator, community leader

Juan Borja Tudela (May 17, 1935 – February 2, 2013) was a Northern Mariana Islander politician and community leader. Tudela was a member of the 14th session of the Northern Mariana Islands House of Representatives and two-term mayor for the island of Saipan, the capital and largest municipality in the Northern Mariana Islands, serving from January 2002 to January 2010.

== Early life ==
Tudela was born to Jesus Tudela and Anunciación Borja on May 17, 1936, on the island of Saipan, which was then part of the Japanese mandate for the South Seas Islands. He was raised in the Roman Catholic faith. As a child, he served as altar server alongside Tomas Aguon Camacho, who would later become the first Bishop of the Roman Catholic Diocese of Chalan Kanoa. Tudela received compulsory education from the Japanese-mandate government until around the time of the invasion of Saipan on June 15, 1944. He was eight years old when U.S. forces landed on Saipan. Saipan was declared secured by the Allied Forces in July, and Tudela's family was relocated to Camp Susupe, where they would remain for the duration of the war and early post-war years.

In his early teens, Tudela left Saipan to attend seminary school on the island of Guam with the intention of becoming an ordained Catholic priest at Father Duenas Memorial School in Dededo but soon returned, becoming a messenger with the Naval Technical Training Unit (NTTU) at NAS Tanapag as the Mariana Islands were transitioning into a post-war naval administrative region.

Tudela was promoted to clerk-typist and eventually reached the position of supervisor around the time the islands were transitioning from a post-war naval administration to a United Nations–established Trust Territory of the Pacific Islands (TTPI) member governed by the United States of America. As a supervisor, Tudela oversaw the procurement and supply of military surplus. Tudela supervised the distribution of these resources across the NMI and other members of the TTPI, still recovering from the effects of 1962 Pacific Typhoon season.

In the 1970s, Tudela moved from Chalan Kanoa to Garapan. He served as community leader in the local Catholic parish before being encouraged to become a district commissioner. Tudela was also instrumental in organizing the local scout troop, now district member for the Boy Scouts of America.

== Political career ==
=== Legislative representative ===
Tudela was elected as a member of the 3rd Commonwealth Legislature in the 1981 election and the 4th Commonwealth Legislature in the 1983 election. In that capacity he authored or co-authored fifty-five bills and resolutions. In the 4th Commonwealth Legislature he served as the Vice Speaker. He did not run for reelection in 1985, instead joining the Democratic gubernatorial ticket of Carlos S. Camacho. The Republican incumbents, Pedro Pangelinan Tenorio and Pedro Agulto Tenorio won the election.

=== Mayor of Saipan ===
Tudela was elected Mayor of Saipan in November 2001 as a member of the Democratic Party. When he took office in January 2002, Tudela was the first Democratic mayor in nearly two decades. He was re-elected in November 2005 as a member of the now defunct Covenant Party. He was a proponent of the NMI–Japan Cultural Exchange Program, which invited Japanese exchange students to the Northern Mariana Islands, helping to re-established the region's connection with mainland Japan. This would eventually lead to the visit of Emperor Akihito and Empress Michiko.

At the end of his second-term in 2009, Tudela announced his decision not to seek re-election for a third term. He was succeeded as Mayor of Saipan by Donald Flores, who took office in January 2010.

== Personal life and death ==
Tudela was married to Antonia Lizama Masga, with whom he had nine children.

Tudela died of stomach cancer at Queen's Medical Center in Honolulu, Hawaii, on February 2, 2013, at the age of 77. His remains were return to Saipan and was buried with full honors and distinction by the CNMI government at Chalan Kanoa cemetery.
