= Ramon Deleon Guerrero =

Northern Mariana Islands politician (1946–2018)

Ramon "Kumoi" Santos Deleon Guerrero (September 19, 1946 – March 20, 2018) was a politician from the Northern Mariana Islands. Guerrero was an independent candidate for Governor of the Northern Mariana Islands in the 2009 gubernatorial election.

== Biography ==
Guerrero previously worked as an assistant to former Governor Froilan Tenorio for seven years. Guerrero also served as the former executive director of the Commonwealth Utilities Corporation (CUC) for four years. He died March 20, 2018 in Guam.

== Political career ==
In the 1999 general election, Deleon Guerrero defeated Republican incumbent Juan P. Tenorio to represent Saipan in the Northern Mariana Islands Senate. During the election, DeLeon Guerrero, the second highest spending candidate in the 1999 election, outspent the incumbent who was the fifth highest spending candidate in the election. He was the first third-party legislator in the CNMI's history and was described by Zaldy Dandan of Marianas Variety as the first opposition senator since 1995.

He was sworn into office in 2000. During the 13th Commonwealth Legislature, he was named Vice President of the Senate after the resignation of Jose M. Dela Cruz. In his 2003 reelection effort, he finished fourth of five candidates, losing to Democratic candidate Luis Palacios Crisostimo. He left office in 2004.

=== Campaign for Governor ===
Guerrero announced his candidacy for Governor of the Northern Mariana Islands in January 2009. At the time, Guerrero said that he had made the final decision to run for governor in early December 2008. In a January 2009 telephone interview with the Saipan Tribune, Guerrero explained his motivation for his gubernatorial bid, "The problems we're facing today are right in front of us. It's telling us how to solve it. We've been playing politics all the time. Politics, everything is politics. We cannot solve this problem by playing politics. We have to go straightforward. We just cannot play this game anymore." Speaking about incumbent office holders who were seeking the governorship in 2009, "How many candidates are running for governor who are in office. What more can they promise? People are suffering. What else can they do? The people are suffering and I want to help. I've been there and I want to help."

Guerrero further announced at the time that the slogan for his 2009 gubernatorial campaign slogan would be, "'Time for a change." He held his first campaign strategy meeting with supporters at his home in As Perdido, Saipan, on January 23, 2009. Rudy Sablan became his campaign chairman.

In March 2009, Guerrero announced that he had chosen David Borja, the former commissioner of the Northern Mariana Islands Public School System, to be his running mate for lieutenant governor. Guerrero said that Borja was chosen from a list of 18 possible running mates, "I asked my committee to streamline the Top 5. In the end, Dr. Borja emerged on top."

The Guerrero-Borja team became the first candidates to officially register with the Commonwealth Election Commission to run for governor on July 10, 2009.

During the campaign, Guerrero urged young people studying overseas to return to the Northern Mariana Islands after completing their education. Guerrero stated that he believed low wages were the major reason why young people choose to work on the U.S. mainland. He said the CNMI government needed to do more to encourage young people to stay in the Commonwealth and that the CNMI should pay workers "their worth." He called on younger workers to return to the CNMI so that older workers could retire saying, "This is their home and we, their people, need them."
