= Juan Pan Guerrero =

Northern Mariana Islands politician (born 1949)

Pan Guerrero

Member of the Northern Mariana Islands Senate from Saipan
- In office January 13, 1986 – January 11, 1990

Personal details
- Born: Juan Tenorio Guerrero; December 10, 1949 (age 76) Saipan, Northern Mariana; Islands, U.S.
- Party: Democratic (before 2009); Independent (2009–present)
- Education: Miami Dade College (attended); Lincoln Business College (attended)

Juan "Pan" Tenorio Guerrero (born December 10, 1949) is a Northern Mariana Islands politician and businessman. He has been a member of the Democratic Party of the Northern Mariana Islands in the past, and ran for Governor of the Northern Mariana Islands in 2009 as an independent, with Representative Joe Camacho as his running mate.

== Biography ==
=== Personal life ===
Juan Pan Guerrero was born on December 10, 1949, at the United States Naval Hospital, in Maturana Hill, Saipan. He was the sixth of the twelve children of parents, Herman Reyes Guerrero and Maria Camacho Tenorio.

Guerrero attended Mt. Carmel School on Saipan for elementary school. He attended high school at both Father Dueñas Memorial School, a Roman Catholic school for boys in Guam, and Rhodes Preparatory School in New York City. Guerrero also enrolled at Miami Dade Junior College and the Nebraska Business College for college.

He resides in Gualo Rai, Saipan, the Northern Mariana Islands.

=== Career ===
Guerrero is the president of chairman of several CNMI based businesses, including Juan T. Guerrero & Associates, Inc. since 1991, the president and general manager of Herman's Modern Bakery, Inc. since 1972, and the president of the Insurance & Business Management Corporation since 1982.

Guerrero was elected to the Northern Mariana Islands House of Representatives, where he served from 1984 to 1985 during the 4th Commonwealth Legislature. During his time in the House, Guerrero served as the chairman on the CNMI House Committee on Appropriations. He was later elected to the Northern Mariana Islands Senate from 1986 to 1990 during the 5th and 6th Commonwealth Legislatures. He was a member of the Committee on Resources and Economic Development and the Special Investigatory Committee while in the Senate.

Juan Pan Guerrero was appointed to a four-year term on the Northern Mariana Islands Retirement Fund board of trustees in December 2006. He was elected the chairman of the board of trustees in 2007. He remained the chairman of the board of trustees until his resignation on August 6, 2009, to campaign for his 2009 gubernatorial run. Under Guerrero, the board of trustees filed a lawsuit against Governor Benigno Fitial's administration in a dispute over employer contributions. A court later ruled that the government of the Northern Mariana Islands owed the NMI Retirement Fund $231.6 million in employer contributions. Guerrero is also credited with leading the Retirement Fund to suspend payments to delinquent members, halting payments to people who were adopted as beneficiaries after a worker had retired, and suspending refund payments under his leadership.

=== Candidacy for Governor of the Northern Mariana Islands ===
Juan Pan Guerrero announced that he would run for Governor of the Northern Mariana Islands as an independent candidate.

In a joint announcement on March 10, 2009, Guerrero announce that Republican Representative Joe Camacho will be his running mate in the 2009 Northern Mariana Islands gubernatorial election. Guerrero had admired Camacho's organization during his campaign for the CNMI House of Representatives in 2007. He promised that the campaign and potential gubernatorial administration would be a partnership between the two. Guerrero spoke to a crowd of supporters at the Lt. Governor announcement at Tan Marikita Café in Garapan saying, "There is only one governor. However, the governor has traditionally delegated authority and responsibility to the lieutenant governor on certain issues and projects. There are many problems facing the CNMI today. It is only right and proper to delegate authority and responsibility so Joe's education, training, skills and experience can be fully utilized."

In a candidate's forum to the NMI Bar Association on September 17, 2009, Guerrero told those in attendance that he and Camacho were not answering to special interest groups. Guerrero, who has campaigned to make the NMI easier to do business, said the most important issues facing the Northern Mariana Islands are the economy, relations with the United States federal government, health care, government efficiency, the NMI Retirement Fund, education, the decline in tourism and infrastructure.

Guerrero told the Bar that he supports a new, appointed Attorney General position should be created in the CNMI, with autonomous powers like the public auditor. He stated that politics should not be a consideration in the appointment of judges.

On the issue of the U.S. federal government takeover of the Northern Mariana Islands immigration, Guerrero stated that the issue was too important for the government to pick an "arbitrary deadline" for federalization to take effect. Governor Fitial had filed a lawsuit against the U.S. government to stop the federalization of immigration. Guerrero said that the CNMI government should use its own government lawyers in the suit, instead of hiring private attorneys using taxpayer money.

Party political offices
Preceded by Froilan Tenorio	Democratic nominee for Governor of the Northern Mariana Islands; Endorsed; 2009	Succeeded by Tofila Deleon Guerrero
