= Donald Flores =

Northern Mariana Islands politician

Mayor of Saipan, Northern Mariana Islands
- In office January 11, 2010 – June 2, 2014
- Preceded by: Juan B. Tudela
- Succeeded by: Marian Tudela

Personal details
- Born: Donald Glen Pangelinan Flores; October 22, 1948; Guam
- Died: June 2, 2014 (aged 65); Garapan, Saipan
- Political party: Republican (-2014); Independent (2014)
- Spouse: Cecilia Flores

Donald Glen Pangelinan Flores (October 22, 1948 – June 2, 2014) was a Northern Mariana Islander politician. Flores served as the mayor of Saipan, the capital and largest municipality of the Northern Mariana Islands, from January 2010 till his death on June 2, 2014. He succeeded retiring Saipan Mayor Juan B. Tudela.

Flores, a Republican, was elected mayor in the 2009 general election held on November 7, 2009. He defeated Covenant Party candidate, Marian Tudela, and Angelo Villagomez. He was sworn into office on January 11, 2010, by Judge Robert C. Naraja at the Office of the Mayor in San Jose, Saipan.

Upon the news of his death, Northern Islands Municipal Council chair Ramon B. Camacho, was selected as acting mayor. On June 8, 2014, Marian Tudela, Flores's former opponent from the 2009 general election, was sworn in by Governor Eloy Inos as Flores's successor as Mayor of Saipan for the remainder of Flores's term, which expires in January 2015.
