= As Perdido, Saipan =

Coordinates: 15°07′49″N 145°42′25″E

As Perdido is a village on Saipan in the Northern Mariana Islands. It is located on the east side of the island, with Koblerville to its west and Chalan Piao to its north. It uses UTC+10:00 and its highest point is 118 feet. It has 259 inhabitants (2020 census).
