= Francisco Q. Cruz =

Northern Mariana Islander politician

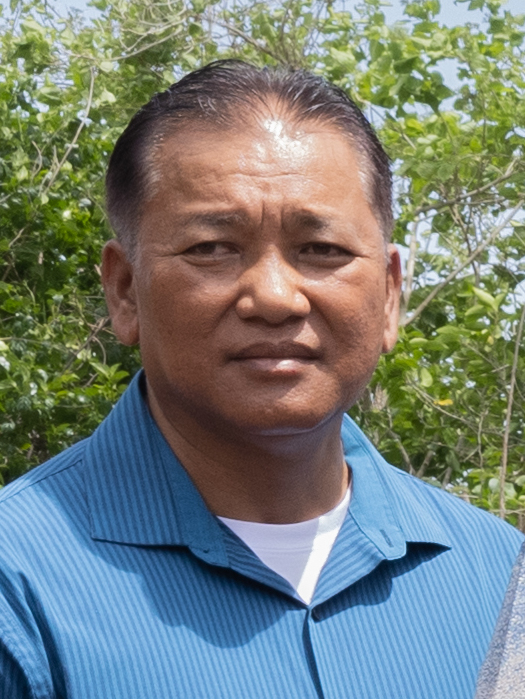
- Cruz at Camp Blaz in 2024

Member of the Northern Mariana Islands Senate from the 2nd district
- Incumbent
- Assumed office January 11, 2010

Personal details
- Born: June 19
- Party: Republican

Francisco Quichuchu Cruz is a Northern Mariana Islander politician. He serves as a Republican member for the 2nd district of the Northern Mariana Islands Senate.

As of 2024, he is serving his eighth term in the Senate. Prior to his election to the Senate, Cruz was a member of the Tinian Municipal Council.
