= Dennis C. Mendiola =

Northern Mariana Islander politician

Dennis Mendiola
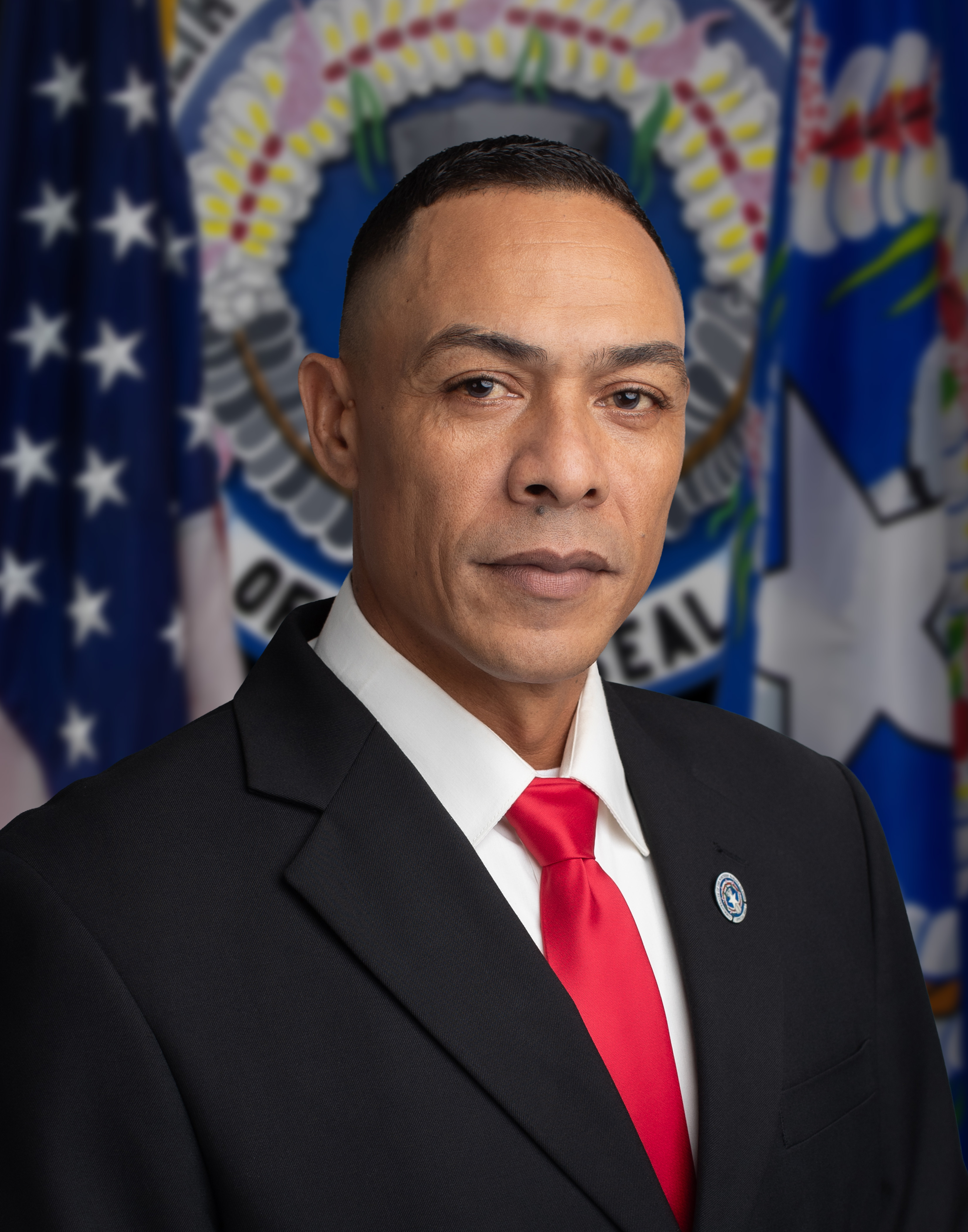
- Official portrait, 2025

14th Lieutenant Governor of the Northern Mariana Islands
- Incumbent
- Assumed office July 23, 2025
- Governor: David M. Apatang
- Preceded by: David M. Apatang

President of the Northern Mariana Islands Senate
- In office January 13, 2025 – July 23, 2025
- Preceded by: Edith DeLeon Guerrero
- Succeeded by: Karl King-Nabors

Member of the Northern Mariana Islands Senate from the 1st district
- In office January 9, 2023 – July 23, 2025
- Preceded by: Victor Hocog; Teresita Santos
- Succeeded by: Paul Manglona

Personal details
- Born: Dennis James Camacho Mendiola; March 2, 1980 (age 46) Guam
- Party: Republican
- Spouse: Ana Maria Salas Mendiola
- Children: 4
- Education: University of Guam (BA, MPA)

Military service
- Allegiance: United States
- Branch/service: Army National Guard
- Years of service: 2009–2015
- Rank: Captain

Dennis James Camacho Mendiola (born March 2, 1980) is a Northern Mariana Islander politician. He is the 14th and current lieutenant governor of the Northern Mariana Islands. Prior to his elevation to the lieutenant governorship after the death of Arnold Palacios, he served as a Republican member for the 1st district of the Northern Mariana Islands Senate.

== Early life and military career ==
Dennis James Camacho Mendiola was born March 2, 1980 in Guam. He was raised by his grandparents in Rota. He attended high school in Rota and Guam before dropping out. He eventually earned his G.E.D. at Guam Community College in 2006. After dropping out, he moved, first to Saipan, then to Guam, to play basketball. Eventually, he was recruited for the Guam men's national basketball team.

He attended the University of Guam and graduated with a degree in public administration and a minor in military science. Upon graduation, he was commissioned as a First Lieutenant in the US Army National Guard. He medically retired in 2015 at the rank of captain after a battle with cancer.

== Political career ==
Mendiola served as the Commissioner of Department of Fire and Emergency Medical Services. He was the campaign chairman for Victor Hocog in the 2018 general election. In 2020, he was the Republican candidate against incumbent Paul Manglona. He lost with 666 votes to Manglona's 764 votes. He ran again in the 2022 election winning a five-way race for two seats in the Senate. On January 8, 2025, it was announced that Mendiola would be elected to the position of President of the Senate for the 24th Commonwealth Legislature.

Mendiola was elevated to the position of lieutenant governor after David M. Apatang was elevated to governor after the death of Arnold Palacios. He announced that he would not be a candidate for public office in the 2026 general election in order to focus on an outstanding corruption allegation.

=== Political positions ===
Mendiola endorsed the Donald Trump’s presidential campaign in the 2024 United States presidential election.

Political offices
Preceded by Edith DeLeon Guerrero	President of the Northern Mariana Islands Senate; 2025	Succeeded by Karl King-Nabors
Preceded by David M. Apatang	Lieutenant Governor of the Northern Mariana Islands; 2025–present	Incumbent
