= Teresita Santos =

Northern Mariana Islands politician

Member of the Northern Mariana Islands Senate from the Rota 1st district
- In office 2015–2022
- Preceded by: Jovita Maratita Taimanao
- Succeeded by: Donald M. Manglona

Member of the Northern Mariana Islands House of Representatives from the 7th district
- In office 2010–2015
- Preceded by: Victor Hocog
- Succeeded by: Glenn Lizama Maratita

Personal details
- Party: Republican (since 2012); Independent (before 2012)

Teresita Apatang Santos (born October 25, 1959) is a politician from the Northern Mariana Islands. She previously served as a member of the Northern Mariana Islands House of Representatives, as a member of the Northern Mariana Islands Senate, and as Secretary of the Department of Public Lands. She is a Republican.

== Background ==
Santos is a resident of the island of Rota, Her cousin is Felix M. Santos, the former director of the Department of Public Safety on Rota. Felix M. Santos challenged her in her seat in the House in 2012.

== Legislative career ==
Santos served in the House of Representatives alongside Felicidad Ogumoro and Janet Maratita; when the latter was sworn in for a new term in 2011 the three became the first three women to serve together in the House in the history of the Northern Mariana Islands. At the time she was an independent.

She was elected to Rota's 1st Senatorial District in the 2014 Northern Mariana Islands general election as a Republican. She was the Legislative Secretary of the Senate. She chaired the committee on Health and Welfare; she is the vice-chair of the committees on Education and Youth Affairs, Fiscal Affairs, and Judiciary, Government, and Law, and was a member of the committees on Rules and Procedure and Executive Appointments and Government Investigations. She has spoken of the need to invest more money in the Commonwealth Healthcare Corporation to improve its hospital services. As of 2017 she was the only woman sitting in the Senate.

In the 2022 general election, instead of running for reelection to the Senate, Santos ran to be Mayor of Rota. Aubrey Manglona Hocog won the election while Santos finished third of five candidates.

== Secretary of Public Lands ==
She served as the Secretary of the Department of Public Lands from February 2023 until April 11, 2025. Governor Arnold Palacios appointed former Senator Sixto Igisomar to succeed her.

== Electoral history ==
=== 2009 ===
House of Representative - District 7: Rota (1 seats)
Party	Candidate	Votes	%
Independent	Teresita Apatang Santos	695	53.50%
Independent	Ross Hugh Songao Manglona	604	46.50%
Total votes		1,299	100.00%

=== 2012 ===
House of Representative - District 7: Rota (1 seat)
Party	Candidate	Votes	%
Republican	Teresita Apatang Santos (incumbent) (Note: Teresita Santos switched her affiliation from Independent to Republican before the elections)	882	58.96%
Independent	Felix Mundo Santos	614	41.04%
Total votes		1,496	100.00%
Republican hold			

=== 2014 ===
Rota 1st Senatorial District (2 seats)
Party	Candidate	Votes	%
Republican	Teresita Apatang Santos	786	28.17%
Republican	Steven King Mesngon	687	24.62%
Independent	Paul Atalig Manglona	633	22.69%
Independent	Jovita Maratita Taimanao (incumbent)	492	17.63%
Independent	Tom Glenn A. Quitugua	192	6.88%
Total votes		2,790	100.00%

=== 2018 ===
Rota 1st Senatorial District (2 seats)
Party	Candidate	Votes	%
Independent	Teresita Apatang Santos (incumbent)	628	21.55%
Republican	Victor Borja Hocog	570	19.56%
Republican	Felix Mundo Santos	540	18.53%
Independent	Albert Atalig Taitano	442	15.17%
Independent	Joel Gogue Charfauros	396	13.59%
Independent	Jovita Maratita Taimanao	338	11.60%
Total votes		2,914	100.00%

=== 2024 ===
Mayor - Rota
Party	Candidate	Votes	%
Republican	Aubry Manglona Hocog	505	34.95%
Independent	Harry James Atalig Masga	470	32.53%
Independent	Teresita Apatang Santos	288	19.93%
Independent	Magdalena San Nicolas Mesngon	159	11.00%
Independent	Alfredo Taisacan Taimanao	23	1.59%
Total votes		1,445	100.00%
Republican hold			
