= Northern Mariana Islands Senate =

Upper house of the Northern Mariana Islands Commonwealth Legislature

- Senate

Type
- Type: Upper house of Northern Mariana Islands

History
- New session started: 23rd Legislature

Leadership
- President: Karl King-Nabors (R) since July 23, 2025
- Vice President: Corina Magofna since July 31, 2025
- Majority Leader: Donald M. Manglona (I) since January 13, 2025
- Minority Leader: Vacant since January 9, 2023

Structure
- Seats: 9
- Political groups: Majority Caucus (7): Republican (4); Independent (3); Minority Caucus (2): Democratic (2)

Elections
- Last election: November 5, 2024
- Next election: 2026

Website
- https://cnmileg.net/senate.asp

The Northern Mariana Islands Senate is the upper house of the Northern Mariana Islands Commonwealth Legislature. The Senate consists of nine senators representing three senatorial districts (Saipan & the Northern Islands, Tinian & Aguijan, and Rota), each a multi-member constituency with three senators.

Maria Frica Pangelinan was the first woman to serve in the Senate.

== Vacancies ==
In the event of a vacancy that occurs less than two years before the end of the Senator's term, the Governor of the Northern Mariana Islands appoints the runner-up of the most recent election. Should that individual decline, the next highest vote getting, unsuccessful candidate become the prospective appointee. Should all the previous candidate's decline, the Governor would then choose an eligible citizen for consideration. In the event a vacancy occurs more than two years before the next scheduled election, a special election is held.

== Senators of the 24th Commonwealth Legislature ==
In the 24th Commonwealth Legislature, the majority caucus consists of four Republicans and three allied independent lawmakers. Karl King-Nabors became President of the Senate after Dennis C. Mendiola was elevated to lieutenant governor after the death of Arnold Palacios. Corina Magofna became Vice President in July 2025. Since the start of the 24th Commonwealth Legislature, Francisco Q. Cruz and Donald M. Manglona have served as legislative secretary and Floor Leader respectively. Ronnie M. Calvo is a member of the majority caucus. As of August 2025, eight of the nine senators make up the majority caucus as all Senators except Celina Babauta are either committee chairs or in a leadership position.

| District | Name | Party | Caucus | Start |
|---|---|---|---|---|
| 1 Rota | Donald M. Manglona | Independent | Majority | January 9, 2023 |
| 1 Rota | Ronnie Calvo | Independent | Majority | January 13, 2025 |
| 1 Rota | Paul Manglona | Independent | Majority | July 31, 2025 |
| 2 Tinian | Jude Hofschneider | Republican | Majority | January 12, 2015 |
| 2 Tinian | Francisco Q. Cruz | Republican | Majority | January 11, 2010 |
| 2 Tinian | Karl King-Nabors | Republican | Majority | January 11, 2021 |
| 3 Saipan | Celina Babauta | Democratic | Minority | January 9, 2023 |
| 3 Saipan | Corina Magofna | Independent | Majority | January 9, 2023 |
| 3 Saipan | Manny Castro | Republican | Majority | January 13, 2025 |

== Past composition of the Senate ==
In the November 2007 elections, the three senators up for re-election were all re-elected to another four-year term in the 16th and 17th Senate. The Covenant Party, which lost control of the House, entered into coalition with the Democrats and a lone Independent over the Senate's leadership and voting agenda. The CNMI Senate was controlled in 2016 by a Republican majority under Senate President Francisco Borja.

| Affiliation | Party (Shading indicates majority/plurality) | | | | | Total | |
| Affiliation | Republican | Independent | Democratic | | Covenant | Total | Vacant |
|---|---|---|---|---|---|---|---|
| End of 17th Legislature | 4 | 4 | 0 | | 1 | 9 | 0 |
| Beginning of 18th Legislature | 5 | 4 | 0 | | 0 | 9 | 0 |
| End of 18th Legislature | 5 | 3 | 0 | | 0 | 9 | 1 |
| Beginning of 19th Legislature | 7 | 2 | 0 | | 0 | 9 | 0 |
| End of 19th Legislature | 6 | 3 | 0 | | 0 | 9 | 0 |
| 20th Legislature | 7 | 2 | 0 | | 0 | 9 | 0 |
| 21st Legislature | 6 | 3 | 0 | | 0 | 9 | 0 |
| 22nd Legislature | 5 | 3 | 1 | | 0 | 9 | 0 |
| 23rd Legislature | 4 | 3 | 2 | | 0 | 9 | 0 |
| 24th Legislature | 4 | 3 | 1 | 1 | 0 | 9 | 0 |
| Latest voting share | 88.9% | | | 11.1% | | | |

== See also ==
- Northern Mariana Islands House of Representatives
- List of Northern Mariana Islands Governors
