= 1993 Northern Mariana Islands referendum =

Ballot measures in the Northern Mariana Islands

A three-part referendum was held in the Northern Mariana Islands on 6 November 1993. Voters were asked whether they approved of two constitutional amendments regarding collective land ownership of native islanders and the veto powers of the Governor, and whether a Constitutional Convention should be elected. All three proposals were approved by voters.

== Background ==
The referendum on electing a Constitutional Convention was held in accordance with the constitution, Chapter XVIII, article 2 of which required such a referendum to be held at least every 10 years. The last such referendum had been held in 1983.

The two constitutional amendments had been approved by a three-quarter majority in both houses of the Legislature, and required only a simple majority of votes in the referendum to be approved.

== Aftermath ==
Following the approval of a Constitutional Convention, a 27-member Convention was formed in 1995 and proposed 19 amendments to the constitution. They were all rejected in a 1996 referendum.
