= 1985 Northern Mariana Islands constitutional referendum =

Ballot measures in the Northern Mariana Islands

A 44-part constitutional referendum was held in the Northern Mariana Islands on 3 November 1985.

== Background ==
In 1983 a referendum on electing a Constitutional Convention was held and approved by voters. The subsequent Convention proposed 44 amendments to the Northern Mariana Islands Commonwealth Constitution, which were to be voted on individually. In order to pass, an amendment was required to be supported by both a majority of voters overall and at least two-thirds of voters in two of the three Senate constituencies.

== Results ==
Question	For		Against		Invalid/ blank	Total	Registered voters	Turnout	Senate seats		Outcome
Question	Votes	%	Votes	%	Invalid/ blank	Total	Registered voters	Turnout	For	Against	Outcome
Chapter I, article 9: Clean and Healthful Environment							7,610				Accepted
Chapter I, article 11: Victims of Crime							7,610				Accepted
Chapter 1, article 12: Abortion							7,610				Accepted
Chapter II, articles 2d, 3d: Election candidates							7,610				Accepted
Chapter II, article 5d: Legislation on nonaliens							7,610				Accepted
Chapter II, article 7: Governor's veto							7,610				Accepted
Chapter II, articles 11, 14a: Legislature members							7,610				Accepted
Chapter II, article 13: Legislature sessions							7,610				Accepted
Chapter II, article 166: Budget ceiling							7,610				Accepted
Chapter II, article 17: Legislative Bureau							7,610				Accepted
Chapter II, article 2: Qualifications of the Governor							7,610				Accepted
Chapter III, article 4: Election of the Governor and Lieutenant Governor							7,610				Accepted
Chapter III, article 7: Succession of the Governor and Lieutenant Governor							7,610				Accepted
Chapter III, article 9: Executive functions							7,610				Accepted
Chapter III, article 10: Emergency powers							7,610				Accepted
Chapter III, article 11: Attorney General							7,610				Accepted
Chapter III, article 12: Public Auditor							7,610				Accepted
Chapter III, article 18g: Salary of the Executive Assistant for Carolinian Affairs							7,610				Accepted
Chapter III, article 20: Retirement system							7,610				Accepted
Chapter III, article 21: Boards and Commissions							7,610				Accepted
Chapter III, article 22: Special Assistant for Women's Affairs							7,610				Accepted
Chapter III, article 23: Resident Executive For Indigenous Affairs							7,610				Accepted
Chapter IV, articles 2–4: Courts and judges							7,610				Accepted
Chapter V: Resident Representative to the United States							7,610				Accepted
Chapter VI: Local government							7,610				Accepted
Chapter VIII, article 1: General election dates							7,610				Accepted
Chapter VIII, article 5: Resignation from public office							7,610				Accepted
Chapter X, article 1: Public purpose							7,610				Accepted
Chapter X, article 5: Real property taxes							7,610				Accepted
Chapter X, articles 6–7							7,610				Accepted
CHapter X, articles 8–9							7,610				Accepted
Chapter XI, articles 4–5: Marianas Public Land Corporation							7,610				Accepted
Chapter XI, article 6							7,610				Accepted
Chapter XII, article 2: Acquisition							7,610				Accepted
Chapter XII, article 3: Interests in Real Property							7,610				Accepted
Chapter XII, articles 5–6							7,610				Accepted
Chapter XIII, article 2: Uninhabited Islands							7,610				Accepted
Chapter XIV							7,610				Accepted
CHapter XVIII, sections 2a, 5a							7,610				Accepted
Chapter XIX, article 1: Code of ethics							7,610				Accepted
Chapter XXX, article 1: Civil service							7,610				Accepted
Chapter XXI, article 1: Gambling							7,610				Accepted
Chapter XXII: State symbols							7,610				Accepted
Transitional provision 8: Nationality							7,610				Quashed by court ruling
Source: Direct Democracy
