= 1996 Northern Mariana Islands constitutional referendum =

Ballot measures in the Northern Mariana Islands

A nineteen-part referendum was held in the Northern Mariana Islands on 2 March 1996. Voters were asked whether they approved of constitutional amendments of each chapter, with a separate vote on each. All amendments were rejected.

== Background ==
A 1993 referendum resulted in a vote in favour of electing a Constitutional Council, which was subsequently elected in March 1995. The Council developed amendments to 19 chapters of the constitution.

The referendum was originally scheduled to be on 4 November 1995 alongside general elections. However, it was later postponed to allow voters more time to familiarise themselves with the amendments.

As well as a majority of votes in favour, each amendment also had to receive at least two-thirds of the vote in favour in two of the three Senate constituencies to be approved.

== Results ==
Only two sets of amendments, to chapters 5 and 15, received a majority of votes in favour. However, in both cases the requirement to get a two-thirds majority in two of the three Senate seats was not achieved. The amendments to Chapter 15 were the only changes to receive two-thirds support in any Senate constituency.

| Question | For | | Against | | Invalid/ blank | Total | Registered voters | Turnout | Senate seats | |
| Question | Votes | % | Votes | % | Invalid/ blank | Total | Registered voters | Turnout | For | Against |
|---|---|---|---|---|---|---|---|---|---|---|
| Chapter 1 | 1,698 | 41.26 | 2,417 | 58.74 | | 4,115 | 10,092 | | 0 | 3 |
| Chapter 2 | 1,521 | 36.56 | 2,639 | 63.44 | | 4,160 | 10,092 | | 0 | 3 |
| Chapter 2, articles 16 and 17 | 1,560 | 38.36 | 2,507 | 61.64 | | 4,067 | 10,092 | | 0 | 3 |
| Chapter 3 | 1,451 | 37.42 | 2,427 | 62.58 | | 3,878 | 10,092 | | 0 | 3 |
| Chapter 4 | 1,914 | 46.28 | 2,222 | 53.72 | | 4,136 | 10,092 | | 0 | 3 |
| Chapter 5 | 2,136 | 53.57 | 1,851 | 46.43 | | 3,987 | 10,092 | | 0 | 3 |
| Chapter 6 | 1,536 | 37.17 | 2,596 | 62.83 | | 4,132 | 10,092 | | 0 | 3 |
| Chapter 7 | 1,764 | 44.92 | 2,163 | 55.08 | | 3,927 | 10,092 | | 0 | 3 |
| Chapter 8 | 1,603 | 38.70 | 2,539 | 61.30 | | 4,142 | 10,092 | | 0 | 3 |
| Chapter 9 | 1,575 | 38.67 | 2,498 | 61.33 | | 4,073 | 10,092 | | 0 | 3 |
| Chapter 10 | 1,546 | 37.67 | 2,558 | 62.33 | | 4,104 | 10,092 | | 0 | 3 |
| Chapter 11 | 1,581 | 38.51 | 2,524 | 61.49 | | 4,105 | 10,092 | | 0 | 3 |
| Chapter 12 | 1,727 | 41.31 | 2,454 | 58.69 | | 4,181 | 10,092 | | 0 | 3 |
| Chapter 13 | 1,024 | 24.66 | 3,128 | 75.34 | | 4,152 | 10,092 | | 0 | 3 |
| Chapter 14 | 1,760 | 42.63 | 2,369 | 57.37 | | 4,129 | 10,092 | | 0 | 3 |
| Chapter 15 | 2,284 | 56.59 | 1,752 | 43.41 | | 4,036 | 10,092 | | 1 | 2 |
| Chapter 17 | 1,610 | 39.37 | 2,479 | 60.63 | | 4,089 | 10,092 | | 0 | 3 |
| Chapter 18 | 1,439 | 35.43 | 2,623 | 64.57 | | 4,062 | 10,092 | | 0 | 3 |
| Chapter 19 | 1,717 | 42.54 | 2,319 | 57.46 | | 4,036 | 10,092 | | 0 | 3 |
Source: Direct Democracy
