= 1983 Northern Mariana Islands Constitutional Convention referendum =

Ballot measure in the Northern Mariana Islands

A referendum on holding a Constitutional Convention was held in the Northern Mariana Islands on 5 November 1983. The proposal was approved by voters. A subsequent 44-part referendum on constitutional amendments was held in 1985.

== Background ==
The referendum was held in accordance with Chapter XVIII, article 2 of the Northern Mariana Islands Commonwealth Constitution, which stated that there must be a referendum on calling a Constitutional Convention every ten years. Voters were asked the question "Shall there be a constitutional convention to propose amendments to the Constitution?"
