= List of populated places in the Northern Mariana Islands =

This is a list of villages in the Northern Mariana Islands. They include:

On Alamagan:

- Alamagan Village (evacuated 2010)

On Agrihan:

- Agrihan Village (evacuated 1990)

On Anatahan:

- Anatahan Village (evacuated 1990)

On Pagan:

- Bandara Village (abandoned)
- Marasu (evacuated 1981)
- Shomushon (evacuated 1981)

On Sarigan:

- Sarigan Village (abandoned)

On Rota:

- Chugai
- Sinapalo
- Shinapaaru
- Songsong

On Saipan:

- Achugao
- As Lito
- As Matuis
- As Perdido
- As Teo
- As Terlaje
- Capital Hill
- Chalan Galaidi
- Chalan Kanoa
- Chalan Kiya
- Chalan Piao
- Chinatown
- Dandan
- Fina Sisu
- Garapan
- Gualo Rai
- Kagman
- Kalabera
- Kannat Tabla
- Koblerville
- Laulau
- Marpi
- Matansa
- Navy Hill
- Papago
- Puerto Rico
- Sadog Tasi
- San Antonio
- San Jose
- San Roque
- San Vicente
- Susupe
- Tapochao
- Talafofo
- Tanapag

On Tinian:

- Carolinas Heights
- Marpo Heights
- Marpo Valley
- San Jose
- Tinian Village
- Unai Dankulo

All the other islands are uninhabited.

== See also ==
- Villages of Guam
- List of cities by country
