= List of Northern Mariana Islands locations by per capita income =

This is a list of Northern Mariana Islands locations by per capita income. In the 2010 U.S. census, the Northern Mariana Islands had a per capita income of $9,656 — the 2nd-lowest per capita income of any state or territory in the United States (only American Samoa had a lower per capita income). In the 2010 U.S. Census, the Northern Mariana Islands had a median household income of $19,958 — the 2nd-lowest of any state or territory of the United States (higher only than Puerto Rico's median household income).

== Northern Mariana counties ranked by per capita income ==
Note: The Northern Mariana Islands does not have counties. The U.S. Census Bureau counts the 4 municipalities of the Northern Mariana Islands as county-equivalents.

Rank	Municipality	Per capita income (2010 Census)	Median household income (2010 Census)
1	Tinian Municipality	$10,489	$24,470
2	Rota Municipality	$9,964	$23,125
3	Saipan Municipality	$9,586	$19,607
4	Northern Islands Municipality (uninhabited)	$0	$0

== Northern Mariana Islands villages ranked by per capita income ==
Many of the per capita incomes and median household incomes in the villages of the Northern Mariana Islands are among the lowest in the United States.

Rank	Village	Per capita income (2010 Census)	Median household income (2010 Census)
1	Capitol Hill	$15,754	$37,411
2	San Vicente	$11,818	$25,750
3	Gualo Rai	$11,255	$22,546
4	San Jose (Tinian)	$10,536	$20,650
5	Chalan Kiya	$9,939	$24,063
6	Finasisu	$9,898	$19,594
7	Garapan	$9,883	$14,940
8	Sinapalo	$9,611	$25,962
9	Dandan	$9,055	$24,231
10	Kagman III	$8,691	$27,552
11	China Town	$8,668	$18,333
12	Chalan Laulau	$8,668	$18,333
13	Fananganan	$8,218	$20,000
14	Susupe	$7,860	$16,709
15	Chalan Piao	$7,684	$14,286
16	Chalan Kanoa I	$7,680	$15,156
17	Chalan Kanoa II	$7,479	$14,293
18	Koblerville	$7,171	$19,103
19	Achugao	$7,009	$20,938
20	San Antonio	$6,615	$12,414
21	Afetnas	$6,551	$14,549
22	Chalan Kanoa IV	$6,477	$14,250
23	Chalan Kanoa III	$6,083	$14,141
