= List of numbered highways in the Northern Mariana Islands =

Numbered highways in the Northern Mariana Islands
- Standard highway shields

Highway names
- Territorial: Hwy. X

System links
- Northern Mariana Islands Highways

The following is a list of numbered highways in the Northern Mariana Islands.

Rota has numbers beginning with 1, Tinian beginning with 2, and Saipan beginning with 3.

== Rota ==
Number	Length (mi)	Length (km)	Southern or western terminus	Northern or eastern terminus	Formed	Removed	Notes
Hwy. 10	9.2	14.8	Hwy. 100 in Songsong	Rota International Airport	—	—	
Hwy. 11	4.6	7.4	Southwest of Sinapalo	Hwy. 10 near Sinapalo	—	—	
Hwy. 100	10.9	17.5	Hwy. 10 in Songsong	Hwy. 10 in Sinapalo	—	—	
Hwy. 101	2.5	4.0	East of Songsong	Hwy. 10 northeast of Songsong	—	—	
Hwy. 103	3.3	5.3	Hwy. 10 at Rota International Airport	Northeast Rota	—	—	

== Tinian ==
Number	Length (mi)	Length (km)	Southern or western terminus	Northern or eastern terminus	Formed	Removed	Notes
Hwy. 20	6.63	10.67	Hwy. 201 in San Jose	Hwy. 21 in northern Tinian	—	—	
Hwy. 21	7.07	11.38	Hwy. 205 in San Jose	Hwy. 203 at Broadway Roundabout south of North Field	—	—	
Hwy. 22	3.59	5.78	Hwy. 205/Hwy. 207 in San Jose	Hwy. 21 near Tinian International Airport	—	—	
Hwy. 23	5.04	8.11	Hwy. 25 near Tinian International Airport	Hwy. 25 near North Field	—	—	
Hwy. 24	3.08	4.96	Hwy. 26 in San Jose	Hwy. 20 in San Jose	—	—	
Hwy. 25	9.39	15.11	Hwy. 26 in San Jose	Hwy. 203 west of North Field	—	—	
Hwy. 26	1.23	1.98	Hwy. 24 in San Jose	Hwy. 21 in San Jose	—	—	
Hwy. 27	4.28	6.89	Suicide Cliff	Hwy 201 in San Jose	—	—	
Hwy. 201	3.21	5.17	Tinian Harbour	Hwy. 20 in San Jose	—	—	
Hwy. 202	2.14	3.44	Tinian Harbour	Hwy. 201 in San Jose	—	—	
Hwy. 203	7.12	11.46	Hwy. 21 at Broadway Roundabout	Hwy. 21 at Broadway Roundabout	—	—	Loop around North Field
Hwy. 204	3.15	5.07	Hwy. 25 in western Tinian	Hwy. 21 north of San Jose	—	—	
Hwy. 205	1.82	2.93	Hwy. 21 in San Jose	Hwy. 22/Hwy. 207 in San Jose	—	—	
Hwy. 206	0.82	1.32	Hwy. 21 in San Jose	Hwy. 205 in San Jose	—	—	
Hwy. 207	1.86	2.99	Hwy. 27 south of San Jose	Hwy. 22/Hwy. 205 in San Jose	—	—	
Hwy. 208	1.48	2.38	Hwy. 201 in San Jose	Hwy. 22 in San Jose	—	—	

== Saipan ==
Number	Length (mi)	Length (km)	Southern or western terminus	Northern or eastern terminus	Formed	Removed	Notes
Hwy. 30	13.2	21.2	Hwy. 32 in Chalan Piao Hwy. 313 in Susupe	Dead end in Susupe Hwy. 36 in Marpi	—	—	
Hwy. 31	9.8	15.8	Hwy. 33 in Laolao	Hwy. 30 in Puerto Rico	—	—	
Hwy. 32	2.2	3.5	Hwy. 33 in Chalan Piao	Hwy. 35/Hwy. 304 near Saipan International Airport	—	—	
Hwy. 33	7.0	11.3	Hwy. 37/Hwy. 301 near Afetna	Hwy. 38 in Garapan	—	—	
Hwy. 34	2.3	3.7	Lalanghita Road in Kagman	Hwy. 31 near Kagman	—	—	
Hwy. 35	2.4	3.9	Hwy. 32/Hwy. 304 near Saipan International Airport	Hwy. 31 near San Vicente	—	—	
Hwy. 36	5.0	8.0	Hwy. 31 near Capitol Hill End of pavement near Bird Island	Windward Road near San Juan Beach Hwy. 30 in Marpi	—	—	
Hwy. 37	3.3	5.3	Hwy. 33/Hwy. 301 near Afetna	Hwy. 31 near San Vicente	—	—	
Hwy. 38	2.6	4.2	Hwy. 33 in Garapan	Hwy. 310 near Mount Tapochau	—	—	
Hwy. 301	1.1	1.8	Hwy. 33/Hwy. 37 near Afetna	Hwy. 37 near Afetna	—	—	
Hwy. 302	2.3	3.7	Hwy. 304 near Saipan International Airport	Hwy. 304 near Naftan	—	—	
Hwy. 303	1.0	1.6	Hwy. 37 near Afetna	Hwy. 33 in Afetna	—	—	
Hwy. 304	4.9	7.9	Hwy. 37 near Afetna	Hwy. 302 near Naftan	—	—	
Hwy. 305	1.7	2.7	Hwy. 304 in Dandan	Hwy. 31 in San Vicente	—	—	
Hwy. 306	1.3	2.1	Hwy. 30 in Chalan Kanoa	Hwy. 37 near San Vicente	—	—	
Hwy. 307	0.8	1.3	Hwy. 306 near Chalan Kanoa	Hwy. 31 near San Vicente	—	—	
Hwy. 308	1.2	1.9	Hwy. 33 in Garapan	Hwy. 30 in Garapan	—	—	
Hwy. 309	0.3	0.48	Hwy. 33 in Chalan Kanoa	Hwy. 30 in Chalan Kanoa	—	—	
Hwy. 310	1.1	1.8	Mount Tapochau	Hwy. 312 near Capitol Hill	—	—	
Hwy. 311	0.2	0.32	Hwy. 33 in Susupe	Hwy. 30 in Susupe	—	—	
Hwy. 312	0.7	1.1	Hwy. 31 near Capitol Hill	Hwy. 31 in Capitol Hill	—	—	
Hwy. 313	0.2	0.32	Hwy. 33 in Susupe	Hwy. 30 in Susupe	—	—	
Hwy. 314	0.5	0.80	Hwy. 323 in Puerto Rico	Santo Remedio Drive in Puerto Rico	—	—	
Hwy. 315	0.3	0.48	Hwy. 33 in Oleai	Hwy. 30 in Oleai	—	—	
Hwy. 316	0.2	0.32	Hwy. 31 in Capitol Hill	Capitol Hill	—	—	
Hwy. 317	0.6	0.97	Hwy. 33 near Garapan	Gualo Rai Road in Gualo Rai	—	—	
Hwy. 318	1.2	1.9	Chalan Matuas near San Roque	Hwy. 320 near San Roque	—	—	
Hwy. 320	2.2	3.5	Hwy. 30 near San Roque	Hwy. 322 near San Roque	—	—	
Hwy. 322	1.8	2.9	Hwy. 36 near Marpi	Suicide Cliff	—	—	
Hwy. 323	1.0	1.6	Hwy. 30 in Puerto Rico	Hwy. 30 in Puerto Rico	—	—	
