= List of lowest-income places in the United States =

A map of states and territories by median household income, updated as of 2019. Data for the Virgin Islands, Northern Mariana Islands, Guam, and American Samoa is from 2010.

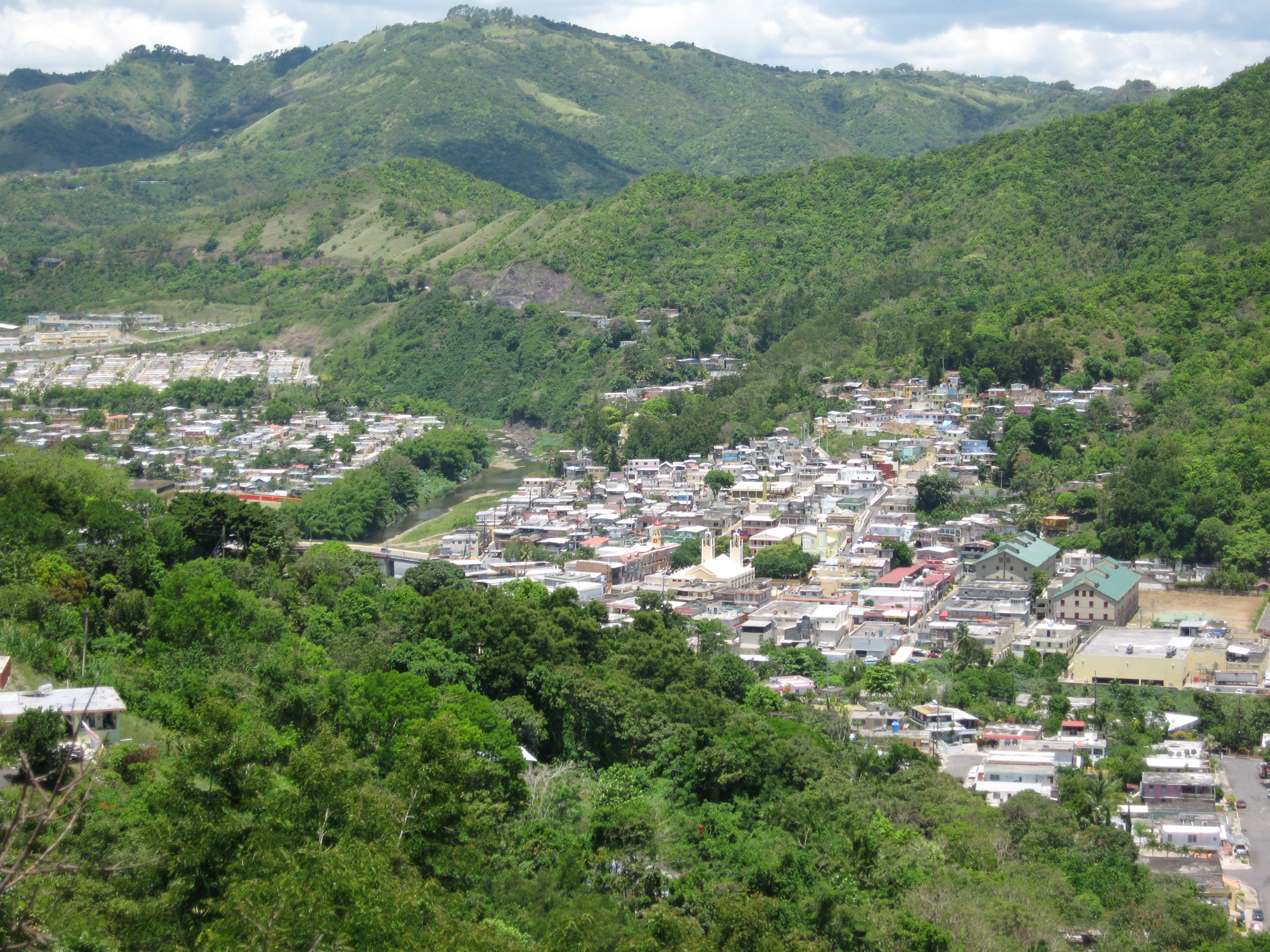
In 2017, Comerío Zona Urbana in Comerío, Puerto Rico had the lowest median household income of any place with more than 1,000 people in the United States (Note: "United States" in this case means the 50 states, the District of Columbia, and Puerto Rico — other U.S. territories are not included in the ACS program)

This is a list of lowest-income places in the United States. According to the United States Census Bureau, the following are the places in the United States with the lowest median household income. Locations with populations from the 2013—2017 American Community Survey are ranked by median household income — the median household income figures are also from the 2013—2017 American Community Survey. The "places" used in this article are what the U.S. Census Bureau defines as "places" (such as Census-Designated Places, or CDPs). In the United States (in 2017), the place with the lowest median household income was Little River, California (population 117), while the place with the lowest median household income with a population of more than 1,000 was Comerío Zona Urbana in Comerío, Puerto Rico (population 4,312). (Note: These figures are out of all places in the 50 states, the District of Columbia, and Puerto Rico — other U.S. territories are not included in the American Community Survey.)

In terms of geographic size, Pine Ridge Indian Reservation and the adjacent Rosebud Indian Reservation (Lakota Sioux Reservations, South Dakota) have long been among the lowest income areas in the United States — Wounded Knee, South Dakota, which is within the Pine Ridge Reservation, had the 7th lowest median household income out of all places in the 50 states/D.C./Puerto Rico (in 2017).

In terms of population size, 3 out of 5 of the largest counties (populations over 1000) are predominantly, or majority white, ranging from 98% to 99% white, while two counties are predominantly black at 60% and 68% black, while the fifth one is 99% Native American.

The U.S. territories have the highest poverty rates in the United States (higher than the poverty rates of the U.S. mainland), and many of the lowest-income places in the United States are found in the U.S. territories of Puerto Rico and American Samoa. In 2018, Comerío Municipality, Puerto Rico had a median household income of $12,812 — the lowest of any county or county-equivalent in the United States.

== Places (2013—2017 American Community Survey) ==
The data below is for annual median household income in the 50 states, the District of Columbia, and Puerto Rico — the data is based on 2013–2017 American Community Survey data from the U.S. Census Bureau; populations are also from the 2013–2017 American Community Survey. (Note: Data for American Samoa and the Northern Mariana Islands is from 2010. Because they are from 2010, they are not ranked.) Places with a population of over 1,000 are shown in bold.

Most of the lowest-income places with more than 1,000 people are located in Puerto Rico. Places in Puerto Rico such as zona urbanas and comunidads are Census-Designated Places. Locations in the U.S. territories (other than Puerto Rico) are included, but are not ranked because they have 2010 data. Data is collected annually for the 50 states, District of Columbia and Puerto Rico (in American Community Survey estimates), but data is not collected annually in other U.S. territories.

For comparison, in 2017 the median household income of the United States (excluding the U.S. territories) was $57,652.

Rank	Place	State or territory	2013–2017 Annual Median Household Income (Note: 2010 U.S. Census for American Samoa and the Northern Mariana Islands — places in these territories are not ranked)	Population (2013–2017 ACS estimates)
1	Little River CDP	California	$3,194	82
2	Villanueva CDP	New Mexico	$4,638	111
3	Nottoway Court House CDP	Virginia	$5,685	137
4	Lower Santan Village CDP	Arizona	$5,857	395
**5**	**Comerío Zona Urbana**	**Puerto Rico**	**$6,242**	**4,312**
6	Anon Raices Comunidad	Puerto Rico	$7,206	122
7	Wounded Knee CDP	South Dakota	$7,292	521
**8**	**Barceloneta Zona Urbana**	**Puerto Rico**	**$7,897**	**3,920**
**9**	**Sabana comunidad**	**Puerto Rico**	**$8,687**	**1,093**
10	Haivana Nakya	Arizona	$8,750	143
**11**	**Palmarejo comunidad (Lajas Municipality)**	**Puerto Rico**	**$8,839**	**1,563**
12	Chula Vista CDP (Cameron County)	Texas	$8,846	486
13	Ravalli CDP	Montana	$8,882	41
14	Pajonal comunidad	Puerto Rico	$8,889	495
15	Valley Ford CDP	California	$8,947	198
16	Long Hollow CDP	South Dakota	$9,063	242
**17**	**Santa Clara comunidad**	**Puerto Rico**	**$9,063**	**1,037**
18	Rincon Zona Urbana	Puerto Rico	$9,107	949
**19**	**Whitley City CDP**	**Kentucky**	**$9,234**	**1,231**
**20**	**Boqueron comunidad (Las Piedras Municipality)**	**Puerto Rico**	**$9,238**	**1,139**
**21**	**Aguada Zona Urbana**	**Puerto Rico**	**$9,255**	**2,615**
**22**	**Sabana Eneas comunidad**	**Puerto Rico**	**$9,409**	**1,204**
23	Oak Hill town	Alabama	$9,464	11
**24**	**Suarez comunidad**	**Puerto Rico**	**$9,524**	**1,931**
25	Tecolote CDP	New Mexico	$9,538	235
26	Norristown CDP	Georgia	$9,583	59
27	Upper Santan Village CDP	Arizona	$9,659	391
**28**	**Fuig comunidad**	**Puerto Rico**	**$10,067**	**1,108**
**29**	**Adjuntas Zona Urbana**	**Puerto Rico**	**$10,257**	**4,302**
30	South Greenfield village	Missouri	$10,278	131
31	Boligee town	Alabama	$10,313	602
**32**	**El Tumbao comunidad**	**Puerto Rico**	**$10,396**	**1,802**
33	Sarah Ann CDP	West Virginia	$10,450	262
34	Buena Vista comunidad (Humacao Municipality)	Puerto Rico	$10,455	816
35	South Acomita Village	New Mexico	$10,500	57
**36**	**Maria Antonia comunidad**	**Puerto Rico**	**$10,526**	**1,115**
**37**	**Naranjito Zona Urbana**	**Puerto Rico**	**$10,532**	**1,593**
38	Juncal comunidad	Puerto Rico	$10,608	631
**39**	**El Ojo comunidad**	**Puerto Rico**	**$10,625**	**1,329**
**40**	**Miranda comunidad**	**Puerto Rico**	**$10,640**	**1,717**
41	Maricao Zona Urbana	Puerto Rico	$10,667	662
42	Pueblito del Carmen comunidad	Puerto Rico	$10,882	692
43	White Mesa CDP	Utah	$10,972	132
**44**	**Caban comunidad**	**Puerto Rico**	**$11,039**	**3,408**
**45**	**Pole Ojea comunidad**	**Puerto Rico**	**$11,113**	**1,644**
**46**	**Ceiba comunidad**	**Puerto Rico**	**$11,150**	**2,524**
**47**	**Palomas comunidad (Yauco Municipality)**	**Puerto Rico**	**$11,156**	**2,083**
**48**	**Camuy Zona Urbana**	**Puerto Rico**	**$11,163**	**3,816**
49	La Ochenta comunidad	Puerto Rico	$11,207	729
50	Oak Hill city	Kansas	$11,250	73
**51**	**Lomas comunidad**	**Puerto Rico**	**$11,280**	**1,253**
**52**	**Aguadilla Zona Urbana**	**Puerto Rico**	**$11,441**	**11,581**
**53**	**Barranquitas Zona Urbana**	**Puerto Rico**	$11,573	1,945
54	La Yuca comunidad	Puerto Rico	$11,591	525
55	Farrell CDP	Mississippi	$11,696	264
56	**Playita Cortada comunidad**	**Puerto Rico**	**$11,714**	**1,273**
57	LaGrange town	Arkansas	$11,750	63
58	Bayside CDP	Virginia	$11,753	224
59	Santa Rita CDP	Montana	$11,808	212
60	Homestead Base CDP	Florida	$11,824	843
**61**	**Morovis Zona Urbana**	**Puerto Rico**	**$11,847**	**2,198**
**62**	**San Sebastian Zona Urbana**	**Puerto Rico**	**$11,858**	**8,614**
**63**	**Loiza Zona Urbana**	**Puerto Rico**	**$11,889**	**3,439**
64	**Playa Fortuna comunidad**	**Puerto Rico**	**$11,960**	**1,375**
65	Quebrada comunidad	Puerto Rico	$11,964	993
**66**	**La Alianza comunidad**	**Puerto Rico**	**$11,995**	**1,793**
—	Si'ufaga village	American Samoa	$12,000	175
67	Allen CDP	South Dakota	$12,083	470
68	Franklin CDP	Maryland	$12,117	263
**69**	**Vieques comunidad**	**Puerto Rico**	**$12,147**	**2,648**
70	Calzada comunidad	Puerto Rico	$12,188	184
**71**	**Acietunas comunidad**	**Puerto Rico**	**$12,215**	**1,706**
**72**	**Palmer comunidad**	**Puerto Rico**	**$12,266**	**1,108**
73	Llano del Medio CDP	New Mexico	$12,344	136
**74**	**Casa Blanca CDP**	**Arizona**	**$12,396**	**1,189**
75	Pageton CDP	West Virginia	$12,411	147
—	**San Antonio village**	**Northern Mariana Islands**	**$12,414**	**1,149**
**76**	**Playita comunidad (Yabucoa Municipality)**	**Puerto Rico**	**$12,448**	**1,561**
**77**	**La Playa comunidad**	**Puerto Rico**	**$12,467**	**2,349**
78	Brecon CDP	Ohio	$12,487	490
—	Olosega village	American Samoa	$12,500	172
79	Organ CDP	New Mexico	$12,500	225
80	**Tallaboa Alta comunidad**	**Puerto Rico**	**$12,500**	**1,934**
81	Rawls Springs CDP	Mississippi	$12,527	866
**82**	**Santa Isabel Zona Urbana**	**Puerto Rico**	**$12,603**	**6,042**
**83**	**Corozal Zona Urbana**	**Puerto Rico**	**$12,691**	**9,203**
**84**	**Mountain Road CDP**	**Virginia**	**$12,791**	**1,055**
**85**	**Jobos comunidad**	**Puerto Rico**	**$12,727**	**2,132**
**86**	**Lares Zona Urbana**	**Puerto Rico**	**$12,742**	**4,615**
**87**	**Patillas Zona Urbana**	**Puerto Rico**	**$12,748**	**3,826**
88	Reader CDP	Arkansas	$12,788	157
**89**	**Las Ollas comunidad**	**Puerto Rico**	**$12,806**	**1,772**
90	Shageluk city	Alaska	$12,813	63
91	Morgan City	Mississippi	$12,857	250
**92**	**Ciales Zona Urbana**	**Puerto Rico**	**$12,914**	**2,276**
**93**	**Buena Vista comunidad (Arroyo Municipality)**	**Puerto Rico**	**$12,957**	**1,257**
**94**	**Liborio Negron Torres comunidad**	**Puerto Rico**	$12,966	**1,482**
**95**	**Cidra Zona Urbana**	**Puerto Rico**	**$13,011**	**5,427**
96	Matewan town	West Virginia	$13,105	460
97	Bajandas comunidad	Puerto Rico	$13,112	747
98	Alligator town	Mississippi	$13,125	100
99	Sidon town	Mississippi	$13,125	456
**100**	**Lluveras comunidad**	**Puerto Rico**	**$13,141**	**1,228**
**101**	**Livingston**	**Alabama**	**$13,272**	**3,416**
**102**	**Manati Zona Urbana**	**Puerto Rico**	**$13,278**	**13,130**
103	Boy River	Minnesota	$13,281	59
**104**	**Palmas comunidad**	**Puerto Rico**	**$13,288**	**1,135**
**105**	**McKee**	**Kentucky**	**$13,306**	**1,179**

=== Other places ===
Other places (in the 50 states) that had a low median household income and a population greater than 1,000 (in 2017):

- **Batesville CDP, Texas - $13,697 (Population 1,163)**
- **Uniontown, Alabama - $14,094 (Population 2,234)**
- **Citrus City CDP, Texas - $14,113 (Population 2,843)**
- **Tchula, Mississippi - $14,412 (Population 1,845)**
- **Baldwin, Michigan - $14,464 (Population 1,310)**
- **Franklin, Georgia - $15,313 (Population 1,050)**
- **Notre Dame CDP, Indiana - $15,625 (Population 6,720)**
- **Highland Park, Michigan - $15,699 (Population 10,955)**
- **Warrenton, Georgia - $15,781 (Population 1,994)**

Other places in the U.S. territories (excluding Puerto Rico) with a low median household income in 2010:

- Failolo, American Samoa - $13,750 (Population 108)
- Chalan Kanoa III, Northern Mariana Islands - $14,141 (Population 794)
- Chalan Kanoa IV, Northern Mariana Islands - $14,250 (Population 631)
- **Chalan Piao, Northern Mariana Islands - $14,286 (Population 1,282)**
- Chalan Kanoa II, Northern Mariana Islands - $14,293 (Population 921)
- **Afetnas, Northern Mariana Islands - $14,549 (Population 1,486)**
- San Jose (Oleai), Saipan, Northern Mariana Islands - $14,783 (Population 954)
- **Garapan, Northern Mariana Islands - $14,940 (Population 3,983)**
- **Chalan Kanoa I, Northern Mariana Islands - $15,156 (Population 1,304)**
- Maia, American Samoa - $15,625 (Population 153)

== Per capita income ==
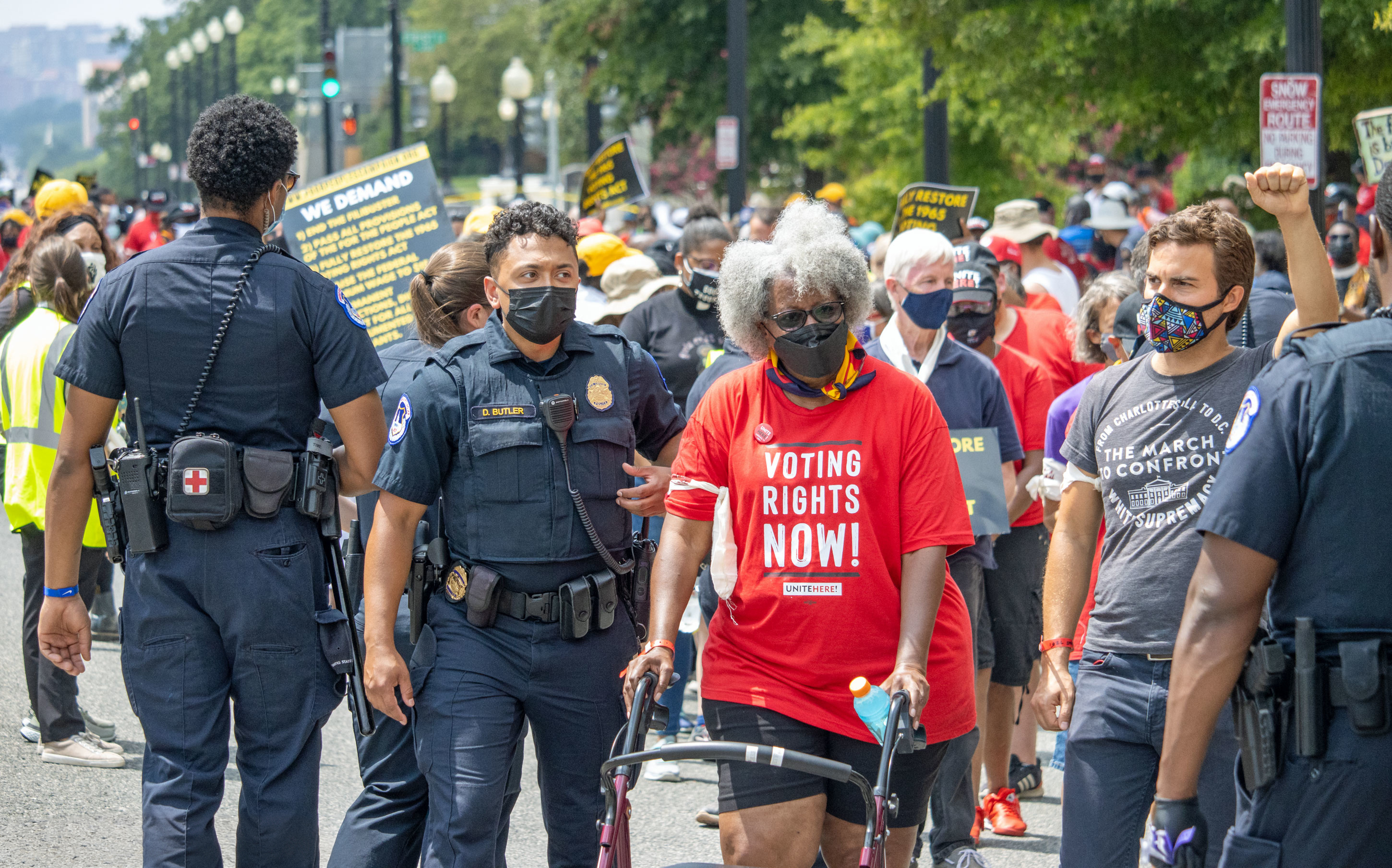
Rally Poor Peoples Campaign Washington DC

American Samoa has the lowest per capita income in the United States. American Samoa's Manu'a District had a per capita income of $5,441 in 2010, while American Samoa overall had a per capita income of $6,311 in 2010. Puerto Rico's municipalities also have low per capita incomes — in 2018, Maricao Municipality, Puerto Rico had a per capita income of $5,974, the lowest of any county or county-equivalent in the American Community Survey. Puerto Rico overall had a per capita income of $12,451 in 2018.

Among U.S. states, Mississippi had a low per capita income in 2018 ($23,434).

== Large cities with a high percentage of low income residents ==
For the survey, a large city is defined as a city with a population of 250,000 or more. Percentage of residents living below the U.S. government established poverty income level is listed, based on 2018 US Census estimates.

1. Memphis, Tennessee 42.3%
2. Detroit, Michigan 36.1%
3. Baltimore, Maryland 34.1%
4. Miami, Florida 31.7%
5. Fresno, California 31.5%
6. Buffalo, New York 30.9%
7. Newark, New Jersey 30.4%
8. Toledo, Ohio 30.1%
9. Milwaukee, Wisconsin 29.9%
10. St. Louis, Missouri 29.2%

== Income inequality ==
The U.S. has the highest level of income inequality among its (post-)industrialized peers. When measured for all households, U.S. income inequality is comparable to other developed countries before taxes and transfers, but is among the highest after taxes and transfers, meaning the U.S. shifts relatively less income from higher income households to lower income households. In 2016, average market income was $15,600 for the lowest quintile and $280,300 for the highest quintile. The degree of inequality accelerated within the top quintile, with the top 1% at $1.8 million, approximately 30 times the $59,300 income of the middle quintile.

The economic and political impacts of inequality may include slower GDP growth, reduced income mobility, higher poverty rates, greater usage of household debt leading to increased risk of financial crises, and political polarization. Causes of inequality may include executive compensation increasing relative to the average worker, financialization, greater industry concentration, lower unionization rates, lower effective tax rates on higher incomes, and technology changes that reward higher educational attainment.

== See also ==
- List of lowest-income counties in the United States
- Persistent poverty county
- Poverty in the United States

== Bibliography ==
- Statistics derived from U.S. Census Bureau data; U.S. Department of Commerce, Bureau of Economic Analysis, Survey of Current Business; and DataQuick Information Systems, a public records database company located in La Jolla, San Diego, CA.
