= NMI Museum of History and Culture =

History museum in Garapan, Saipan

- Established: 1998
- Location: Kopa Di Oru Street and Chichirica Avenue, Garapan, Saipan
- Coordinates: 15°12′6″N 145°43′8″E
- Director: Leonard "Leni" Leon
- Website: nmimuseum.org

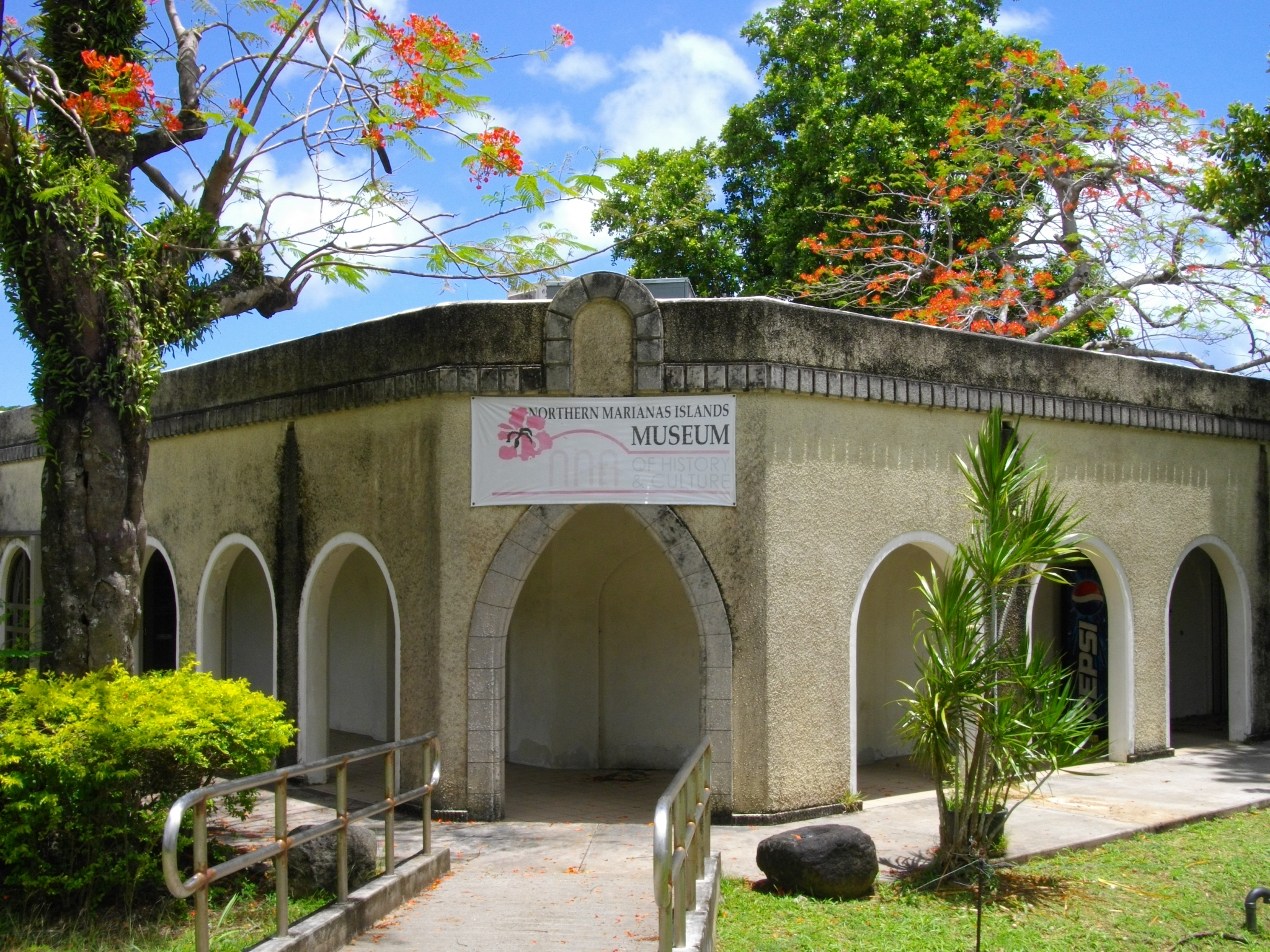
Northern Marianas Islands Museum

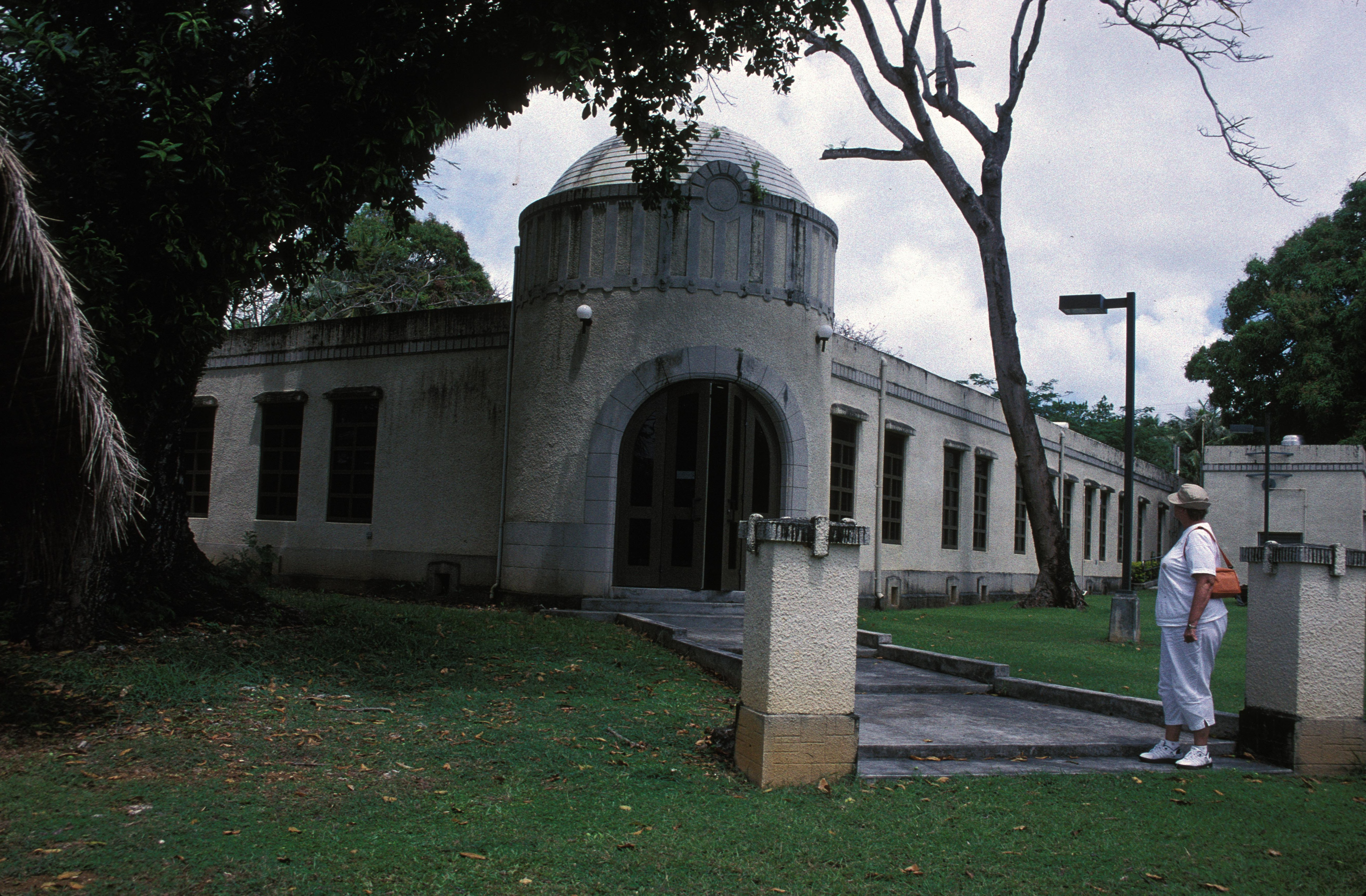
Picture of the NMI Museum of History and Culture

The NMI Museum of History and Culture, also known as the NMI Museum, is a museum in Garapan, Saipan hosting exhibitions about the Chamorro and Carolinian people and also displays artifacts, documents, textiles, and photographs from the Spanish, German, Japanese, and American periods in the Northern Mariana Islands. The museum has repatriated a significant number of historic objects from the Marianas that were held nationally and internationally in private collections and by foreign museums, companies, and militaries. More than one million dollars has been invested in its collections. The historical buildings on the grounds have been renovated to preserve them, prevent further deterioration, and safeguard visitors. The museum is located across from Sugar King Park.

The museum carries out school programs, hosts field trips for local and international primary and secondary students, and provides assistance to a variety of Northern Marianas College classes. The museum sees visitors and researchers from East Asia, North America, Australia, other islands in Micronesia. It provides assistance related to land matters, ammunition depots, chemical storage areas, past commercial activity, and other matters that require research of historic information. The museum is the end recipient of all of the historic material derived from land surveys and pre-development archaeological work. It is by law the repository of all of the historic objects of the CNMI, charged with their preservation, management, and maintenance. The museum loans objects to American Memorial Park and partners with the Marianas Visitors Authority, CNMI Arts Council, and other organizations for events. It is operated under the Saipan municipality and listed in the Pacific Islands Museums Association Directory. It is part of the Garapan Heritage Trail, a project of the Northern Marianas Humanities Council with financial support by the National Endowment for the Humanities and the Office of Insular Affairs, United States Department of the Interior.

== History ==
The museum was created by CNMI Public Law 10-5, which was enacted in 1996. It was first opened to the public on November 4, 1998. In 1999, the works of artist Chen Xiao Ping were exhibited. In September 1999, the museum showed a traveling exhibit about the Chamorro migrants of Yap. The exhibit included photographs, oral or written testimonies, maps, letters, excerpts from a diary, and copies of church records from Saint Mary's Parish in Colonia, Yap. In the summer of 1999, the government of Germany turned over CNMI replicas and photocopies of maps, stamps, documents, photos, and postcards reflecting the colonization period. In November 1999, the museum opened an exhibition about the German period in the islands titled "Tiempon Aleman: German Rule of the Northern Marianas 1899-1914."

In 2000, the museum worked with the Japanese Society of the Northern Mariana Islands and other organizations, as well as with translator Noriyasu Horiguchi, to showcase an exhibition about the Japanese period in the islands. Displayed objects included photographs, film clips, artifacts, maps, post cards, stamps, models, reproductions, and oral histories. The Sugar King Foundation provided several artifacts, including a Nan'yō Kōhatsu kabushiki gaisha "Happi Coat" given to company employees in recognition for their years of service. Replicas of the Ota Confectionery storefront which used to be on Garapan, the Kristo Rai bell tower, and the Hachiman Jinja tonii were created.

In spring and summer 2004, the museum presented personal histories and oral testimonies of Chamorros and Carolinians during the Asia–Pacific War. The museum also displayed items and images of the Navajo Code Talkers and Atomic bombings of Hiroshima and Nagasaki and crafts made by civilians in Camp Susupe. That same year, it showed the exhibition "The Japanese Administration in the Northern Mariana Islands: The Birth of the Industrial Period 1914—1941." Objects and photographs associated with the sugar industry and South Seas Development Company (Nan'yō Kōhatsu kabushiki gaisha), including an original scrapbook donated to the museum by Director Haruji Matsue's son and grandson, were displayed. In June 2004, the crew of the Enola Gay, including Paul Tibbets, Morris Jeppson, and Theodore Van Kirk, visited the museum and donated objects to it.

In January 2005, Takahisa Aoyagi and Takao Fukushima donated Japanese Period items related to the Nanyoji Temple and the Saipan Girls' High School to the museum. That same month, the museum held the exhibition "The Influence of Catholicism in the Marianas." Displayed items included candle holders, altar lamps, bells, basins, old books and illustrations, and an early twentieth century chair made of narra wood carved and upholstered in crimson velvet. In spring 2005, it showed the exhibition "Castaways on Anatahan: the Last Surrender. 1944 to 1951." In May 2005, a museum representative found a prehistoric Chamorro gorge fish hook in Chalan Kanoa during an archaeological excavation. In May 2005, San Vicente Elementary School students visited the museum. In July 2005, the mayor of Aizuwakamatsu, Fukushima Prefecture, Japan and film crew creating a documentary about Haruji Matsue toured the museum. In December 2005, students in a research group from Tsuru University in Yamanashi Prefecture, Japan visited the museum. In February 2006, the museum's exhibit curator held a presentation on prehistoric Chamorro culture at San Vicente Elementary School. In November 2006, the museum sponsored the visit of the Shanghai Media Group and Shanghai Morning Post. In May 2009, the Marianas March Against Cancer's Team held a fundraising lunch at the museum.

In May 2012, the Micronesian Repatriation Association (MRA) of Okinawa contributed a collection of photographs from the Japanese period to the museum. In May 2014, the MRA placed a monument on the museum grounds. In June 2014, the CNMI Arts Council's "Art in the Park" event was held on the museum grounds. In October 2014, the museum was part of route for a walk against domestic violence held by the Northern Marianas Coalition Against Domestic & Sexual Violence.

In September 2015, volunteers helped cleanup debris after Typhoon Soudelor hit this island. In November 2015, the museum sent a representative to an archaeological dig in Garapan where human remains and a ceramic bowl were uncovered. In the winter of 2017, the grandson of Haruji Matsue donated oil paintings that depict pre-war images of Saipan to the museum. In January 2016, the CNMI Bureau of Environmental and Coastal Quality worked with the museum to build a rain garden on the grounds. The rain garden catches pollutants and sediment that might otherwise end up in the ocean. In 2016, the museum displayed historic handkerchiefs with Japanese illustrations from the 1940s. In February 2017, contestants in the Miss Pusong Pinoy pageant visited the museum. In July 2017, the museum participated in the annual Liberation Day Festival. In December 2017, the museum hosted guests from the Keio Corporation, Shizuoka Railway, Tobu Railway, JTB Corporation, and other Japanese companies. In January 2018, the museum gave demonstrations at the Marianas Tourism Education Council Tourism Summit at Fiesta Resort & Spa Saipan to share Marianas culture and help students learn about responsible and sustainable tourism projects.

In the summer of 2019, the museum had an exhibition, financed by the Northern Marianas Humanities Council, of archival photographs of civilians and combatants for the 75th Anniversaries of the Battle of Saipan and Battle of Tinian during the Asia–Pacific War. In July 2019, the museum was a sponsor of the Liberation Day festivities and took part in the parade with a carnival-ride train and gave children rides. That same month, the museum held a field trip for the Summer Reading Program of the Joeten-Kiyu Public Library Branch, State Library of the Commonwealth of the Northern Mariana Islands. In December 2019, museum staff completed the Marianas Visitors Authority tour guide certification program.

In early January 2020, Saipan International School students and exchange students from Korea visited the museum. In mid-January 2020, the descendants of Admiral George Anson visited the museum. In late-January 2020, the museum participated in the Marianas Tourism Education Council Tourism Summit for the CNMI Public School System.

Current collections include Micronesian slings and projectiles, Spanish galleon treasure, Catholic relics, war memorabilia, and more. Pottery storage jars from the sunken galleon Nuestra Señora de la Concepción and gold pieces are located in the museum's Concepcion Collection. The museum has a 1934 Missale Romanum (a Latin Mass book), a one hundred year-old chalice, and a pre-war Monstrance of the Blessed Sacrament, which are on loan from Bishop Ryan Jimenez of the Roman Catholic Diocese of Chalan Kanoa. The museum preserves items donated to it by the families of American and Japanese veterans and Japanese, Okinawan, Korean, Chamorro, and Carolinian people who lived in the islands before and during the Pacific War.

In the 2020s, the museum plans to construct temporary huts to provide a venue for local artists to teach, display, and sell local products to guests. The CNMI Department of Community and Cultural Affairs, CNMI Arts Council, Indigenous Affairs Office, and the Chamorro Indigenous Affairs, and Carolinian Affairs Offices have expressed support. The museum also desires to build a Chamorro and Carolinian cultural center similar to Hawaii's Polynesian Cultural Center.

== Buildings ==
The museum is located at the old Japanese hospital, which was a medical facility on Saipan between 1926 and 1944. It is the largest Japanese building on the island to survive the war. The hospital was listed on National Register of Historic Places in 1974.

In 2019, the Japanese laboratory adjacent to the hospital building was renovated and is the proposed site for the museum gift and coffee shop. The structure will be repurposed to help generate revenue for the museum.

== Funding ==
The museum has experienced inadequate funding in the 21st century. In the 2000s and 2010s, there were cuts to its operational budget and personnel. Staff had to pay out of their own pockets for gallery light bulbs, lawn maintenance equipment, computers, museum vehicles and fuel, and other supplies. They also had to volunteer their unpaid time to keep the museum open late and on weekends for tours, presentations, and other activities.

Some museum property was damaged or lost because of the lack of funds for renovations and preservation, as well as from tropical storms. In 2000, floods caused by heavy rains caused minor damages to artifacts and displays. In October 2008, a heavy downpour flooded the museum, which brought several inches of water and mud into the exhibition areas and administrative offices. In 2015, the museum and trees on the grounds sustained damage from Typhoon Soudelor. There was moisture and water damage. Vegetation grew in cracks of the building. The buildings had foundation issues. Damaged artifacts included a prehistoric Chamorro canoe, Japanese period photographs, Japanese military uniforms and gear, artifacts from a Spanish galleon, books on the history of the Concepcion, and remains of Pacific War soldiers.

In May 2014, leftover funds from the class action against the Saipan garment industry were donated to the museum.

In March 2019, the museum partnered with the Saipan Southern High School Student Council for a carwash fundraiser to support the institution.

== Benefactors ==
The Director of the museum told the Saipan Tribune, "...there are students visiting and we want to help preserve the culture of the CNMI and to promote it as a tourist attraction" and that benefactors will be "investing in the future of the children of the CNMI."

In 2004, Pacific Development Inc. on Saipan provided financial assistance to the museum.

The museum has limited space for storage, curatorial and administrative work, and research. In 2017, the United States Department of Defense, Saipan Shipping Company, and IT&E donated three twenty foot containers that were modified to hold human remains and artifacts in the museum's possession.

In 2017, IT&E committed three small air-conditioning units for the museum. In the late 2010s, the museum received grants from the Marianas Visitors Authority to preserve the building and to safeguard its exhibits and IT&E Saipan provided phone, fax, and internet services.

In June 2018, McDonald's Saipan presented a $3,000 check to the NMI Museum. In July 2018, the Marianas Young Professionals raised over $2,000 for the museum, which included a $1,000 donation from Duty Free Saipan (DFS) Ltd.

In 2020, the Tan Siu Lin Foundation of the Tan Holdings Corporation donated to the museum.
