= Commonwealth of the Northern Mariana Islands Public School System =

Education system of the U.S. territory

Commonwealth of the Northern Mariana Islands Public School System (CNMI PSS) is a school district serving the Northern Mariana Islands, a United States territory.

Its headquarters are in Susupe, Saipan.

== Northern Mariana Islands Board of Education ==
The elected members of the Northern Mariana Islands Board of Education are listed below.

District	Name	Start	Party	Next Election
1 (Rota)	Anthony Barcinas, Vice Chair	January 13, 2025	Independent	2028
2 (Tinian)	Antonio Borja, Secretary-Treasurer	October 30, 2020	Independent	2026
3 (Saipan)	Aschumar Ogumoro-Uludong	January 13, 2025	Independent	2028
3 (Saipan)	Andrew Orsini	January 2019	Independent	2026
3 (Saipan)	Maisie Tenorio, Chair	January 11, 2021	Independent	2028

Non-elected members

- Dora Miura, Teacher Representative
- John Blanco, Non-Public School Representative
- Jude Burgos, Student Representative

== Schools ==
=== Grades 7–12 schools ===
Rota

- Dr. Rita Hocog Inos Jr./Sr. High School (Songsong) - Rota Jr./Sr. High School was formed in 2006 by the consolidation of Rota High School and Rota Junior High School

Tinian

- Tinian Jr./Sr. High School (San Jose)

=== High schools ===
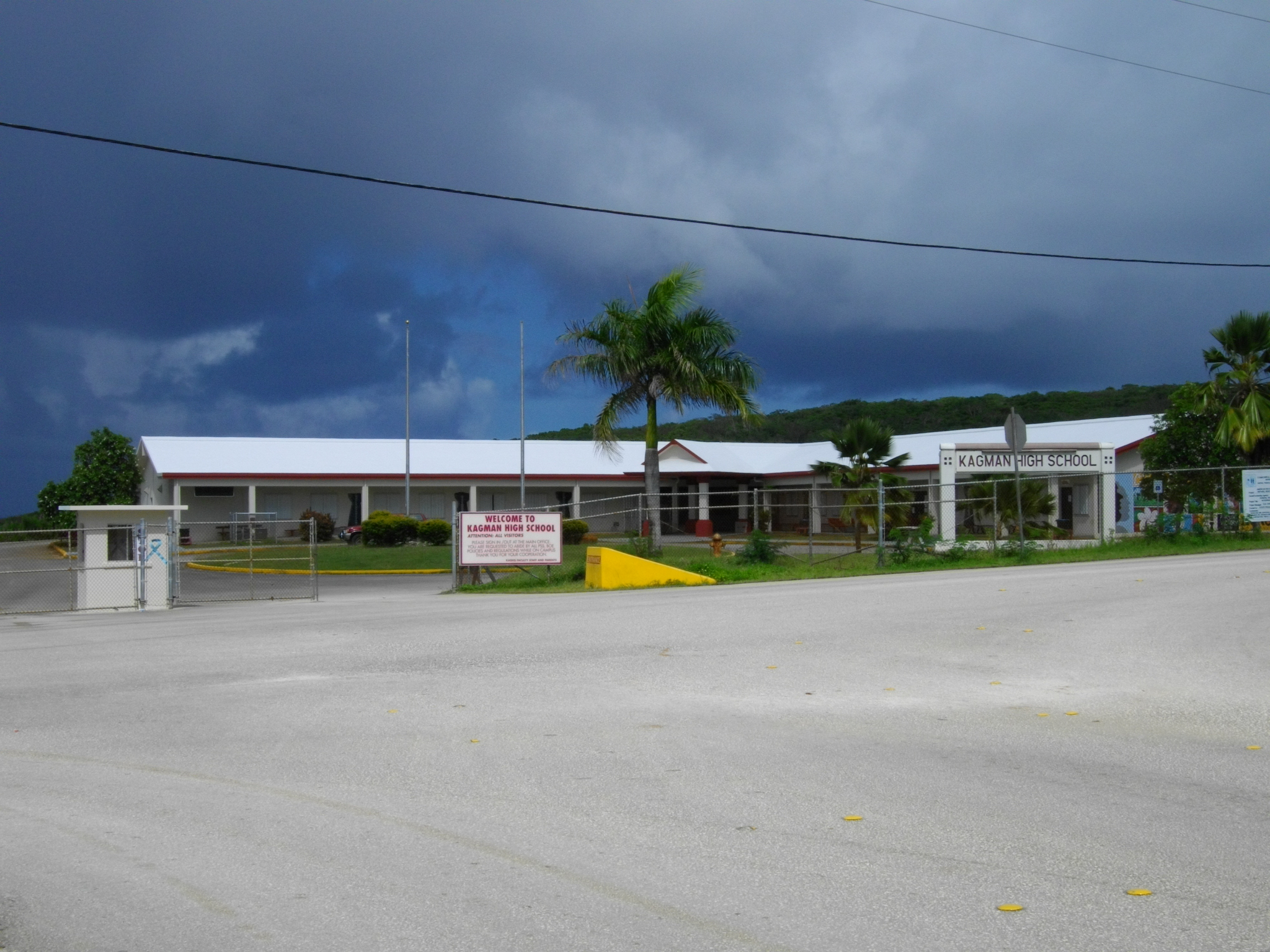
Kagman High School

Saipan

- Kagman High School (Kagman) (Opened January 2002)
- Marianas High School (Susupe)
- Saipan Southern High School (Koblerville) (Opened August 2002)
- Da’ok Academy

=== Middle schools ===
Saipan

- 7–8
  - Chacha Oceanview Middle School (Kagman) (Opened August 2002)
  - Dandan Middle School
  - Hopwood Middle School (Chalan Piao)
  - Francisco M. Sablan Middle School
  - Tanapag Middle School

=== Elementary schools ===
Saipan

- Gregorio T. Camacho Elementary School (San Roque)
  - It opened as the San Roque Elementary School in 1951 and was renamed after the first commissioner of San Roque, Gregorio T. Camacho. Camacho served as the president of the school's parent-teacher association
- Garapan Elementary School (Garapan)
- Kagman Elementary School (Kagman) (Opened 2000)
  - It opened on September 5, 2000 and is in Kagman III.
- Koblerville Elementary School (Koblerville)
- Oleai Elementary School (San Jose)
  - Its student body as of 2007 was majority Carolinian. It was established in 1958.
- William S. Reyes Elementary School (Chalan Kanoa)
  - It is named after the CNMI's first superintendent of education, William Sablan Reyes. It was established as the Findley School for Native Children in 1946 and was later renamed to Chalan Kanoa Elementary School. It received its current name in 1984.
- San Vicente Elementary School (San Vicente)

Rota

- Sinapalo Elementary School (Sinapalo) (Opened 2001)
  - Previously Rota Elementary & Junior High School in Songsong had elementary classes. Sinapalo Elementary was built in two phases, with the Rota government and Rota Resort Hotel financing it. In 1995 phase I was built. There was a four-year hiatus in the construction that ended when the Rota government allowed it to continue. The school opened in February 2002 when phase II was built.

Tinian

- Tinian Elementary School (San Jose)
  - Additions were installed beginning Spring 1999, including new classrooms and air conditioning.

=== Former schools ===
Saipan:

- Dandan Elementary School (Dandan) (Opened August 1998) – Served Dandan and portions of San Vicente
- San Antonio Elementary School (San Antonio)
- Tanapag Elementary School (Tanapag)

Previously the system operated an elementary school on Pagan, Northern Islands Municipality, prior to the 1981 eruptions. In 1977 the school had 13 students. After elementary school, students from Pagan would then attend secondary school on Saipan.
