= Bayside, Virginia =

Bayside, Virginia may refer to:

- Bayside, Accomack County, Virginia
- Bayside, Virginia Beach, a neighborhood in Virginia Beach
