= List of museums in the Northern Mariana Islands =

Museums in the Northern Mariana Islands include:

- NMI Museum of History and Culture
- American Memorial Park
