= List of the most populous counties by U.S. state =

The following is a sortable table of the most populous county in each U.S. state, federal district, and territory. Counties and states/territories in bold have a population of at least 1 million.

== Table ==
State, federal district, or territory	Largest county, parish, or municipality (Note: In the U.S. territories, the U.S. Census Bureau defines the following as county-equivalents: the districts and atolls of American Samoa, Guam as one entity, the municipalities of the Northern Mariana Islands, the municipalities of Puerto Rico, the islands of the U.S. Virgin Islands, and the islands of the U.S. Minor Outlying Islands. The District of Columbia is counted as one county-equivalent by the U.S. Census Bureau.)	Population (2024 estimate)	County seat, parish seat, or shire town	State, federal district, or territory population (2024 estimate) (Note: Territory estimates are from 2017 (except American Samoa — its estimate is from 2010).)	Population of largest county, parish, or municipality as a percentage of total state, federal district, or territory population
Alabama	Jefferson	664,744	Birmingham	**5,157,699**	12.89%
Alaska	Anchorage	289,600	Anchorage	740,133	39.13%
American Samoa	Western District (Note: American Samoa has 14 counties, but these counties are not counted by the U.S. Census Bureau (they are treated as minor civil divisions).)	31,819	—	46,765	68.04%
Arizona	**Maricopa**	**4,673,096**	Phoenix	**7,582,384**	61.63%
Arkansas	Pulaski	401,209	Little Rock	**3,088,354**	12.99%
California	**Los Angeles**	**9,757,179**	Los Angeles	**39,431,263**	24.74%
Colorado	El Paso	752,772	Colorado Springs	**5,957,493**	12.64%
Connecticut	Capitol	991,508	Hartford	**3,675,069**	26.98%
Delaware	New Castle	588,093	Wilmington	**1,051,917**	55.91%
District of Columbia	District of Columbia	702,250	District of Columbia	702,250	100.00%
Florida	**Miami-Dade**	**2,838,461**	Miami	**23,372,215**	12.14%
(Georgia (U.S. state)) Georgia	**Fulton**	**1,090,354**	Atlanta	**11,180,878**	9.75%
Guam	Guam (Note: All of Guam is counted as one county-equivalent by the U.S. Census Bureau.)	168,801	Hagåtña	168,801	100.00%
Hawaii	Honolulu	998,747	Honolulu	**1,446,146**	69.06%
Idaho	Ada	535,799	Boise	**2,001,619**	26.77%
Illinois	**Cook**	**5,182,617**	Chicago	**12,710,158**	40.78%
Indiana	Marion	981,628	Indianapolis	**6,924,275**	14.18%
Iowa	Polk	516,185	Des Moines	**3,241,488**	15.92%
Kansas	Johnson	632,276	Olathe	**2,970,606**	21.28%
Kentucky	Jefferson	793,881	Louisville	**4,588,372**	17.30%
Louisiana	East Baton Rouge	453,022	Baton Rouge	**4,597,740**	9.85%
Maine	Cumberland	313,809	Portland	**1,405,012**	22.33%
Maryland	**Montgomery**	**1,082,273**	Rockville	**6,263,220**	17.28%
Massachusetts	**Middlesex**	**1,668,956**	Cambridge and Lowell	**7,136,171**	23.39%
Michigan	**Wayne**	**1,771,063**	Detroit	**10,140,459**	17.47%
Minnesota	**Hennepin**	**1,273,334**	Minneapolis	**5,793,151**	21.98%
Mississippi	Harrison	213,730	Biloxi and Gulfport	**2,943,045**	7.26%
Missouri	St. Louis	992,929	Clayton	**6,245,466**	15.90%
Montana	Yellowstone	171,583	Billings	**1,137,233**	15.09%
Nebraska	Douglas	601,158	Omaha	**2,005,465**	29.98%
Nevada	**Clark**	**2,398,871**	Las Vegas	**3,267,467**	73.42%
New Hampshire	Hillsborough	430,462	Manchester and Nashua	**1,409,032**	30.55%
New Jersey	Bergen	978,641	Hackensack	**9,500,851**	10.30%
New Mexico	Bernalillo	671,747	Albuquerque	**2,130,256**	31.53%
(New York (state)) New York	**Kings**	**2,617,631**	Brooklyn	**19,867,248**	13.18%
North Carolina	**Wake**	**1,232,444**	Raleigh	**11,046,024**	11.16%
North Dakota	Cass	200,945	Fargo	796,568	25.23%
Northern Mariana Islands	Saipan	43,385	Capitol Hill	44,278	97.98%
Ohio	**Franklin**	**1,356,303**	Columbus	**11,883,304**	11.41%
Oklahoma	Oklahoma	816,490	Oklahoma City	**4,095,393**	19.94%
Oregon	Multnomah	795,897	Portland	**4,272,371**	18.63%
Pennsylvania	**Philadelphia**	**1,573,916**	Philadelphia	**13,078,751**	12.03%
Puerto Rico	San Juan	332,454	San Juan	**3,203,295**	10.38%
Rhode Island	Providence	675,912	Providence	**1,112,308**	60.77%
South Carolina	Greenville	570,745	Greenville	**5,478,831**	10.42%
South Dakota	Minnehaha	208,639	Sioux Falls	924,669	22.56%
Tennessee	Shelby	910,530	Memphis	**7,227,750**	12.60%
Texas	**Harris**	**5,009,302**	Houston	**31,290,831**	16.01%
(United States) U.S. Minor Outlying Islands	Wake Island	(150) (Note: Wake Island's population is non-permanent. Wake Island, Midway Atoll and Palmyra Atoll all have small non-permanent human populations; of these, Wake Island is the most populous. The U.S. Census Bureau counts the islands in the U.S. Minor Outlying Islands as a county-equivalents.)	(none)	(300)	50.00%
Utah	**Salt Lake**	**1,216,274**	Salt Lake City	**3,503,613**	34.71%
Vermont	Chittenden	170,851	Burlington	648,493	26.35%
(United States Virgin Islands) Virgin Islands (U.S.)	Saint Thomas island	44,500	— (Note: "Saint Thomas island" is a U.S. Census Bureau entity (county-equivalent) with no administrative significance. Charlotte Amalie is the largest city on Saint Thomas and is the capital of the U.S. Virgin Islands.)	104,377	42.63%
Virginia	**Fairfax**	**1,160,925**	Fairfax	**8,811,195**	13.18%
(Washington (state)) Washington	**King**	**2,340,211**	Seattle	**7,958,180**	29.41%
West Virginia	Kanawha	173,906	Charleston	**1,769,979**	9.83%
Wisconsin	Milwaukee	924,740	Milwaukee	**5,960,975**	15.51%
Wyoming	Laramie	101,783	Cheyenne	587,618	17.32%
