= Numbered highways in the United States =

Highways are split into at least four different types of systems in the United States: Interstate Highways, U.S. Highways, state highways, and county highways. Highways are generally organized by a route number or letter. These designations are generally displayed along the route by means of a highway shield. Each system has its own unique shield design that will allow quick identification to which system the route belongs.

== History ==
In 1918, Wisconsin became the first state to number its highways in the field followed by Michigan the following year. In 1926 the American Association of State Highway Officials (AASHO) established and numbered interstate routes (United States Numbered Highways), selecting the best roads in each state that could be connected to provide a national network of federal highways.

== Interstate Highways ==
Standard Interstate

Standard Interstate (wide)

Interstate with State name

Interstate Business Loop

Interstate Business Spur

The Interstate Highway System is a federally funded and administered but state-maintained system of freeways that forms the transportation backbone of the United States, with millions of Americans relying on it for commutes, long-distance travel, and freight transport daily, among other things. Interstate highways are all constructed to precise standards, designed to maximize high-speed travel safety and efficiency. Interstate Highways also contain auxiliary routes, which are normally assigned a three-digit route number. All Interstate Highways are part of the National Highway System, a network of highways deemed essential to the defense, economy, and mobility of the country.

== U.S. Highways ==
Standard U.S. Highway

Standard U.S. Highway (wide)

California-style U.S. Highway

1961-era U.S. Highway

1948-era U.S. Highway

1926-era U.S. Highway

The United States Numbered Highway System is an older system consisting mostly of surface-level trunk roads, coordinated by the American Association of State Highway and Transportation Officials and maintained by state and local governments. U.S. Highways have been relegated to regional and intrastate traffic, as they have been largely supplanted by the Interstate system for long-distance travel except in areas (especially in the West) where the Interstate system is absent or underdeveloped. This has led to the decommissioning and truncation of U.S. Highways that were formerly vital long-haul routes, such as U.S. Route 21 and U.S. Route 66.

== State highways ==
Alabama

Alaska

Arizona

Arkansas

California

Colorado

Conn.

Delaware

Florida

Georgia

Hawaii

Idaho

Illinois

Indiana

Iowa

Kansas

Kentucky

Louisiana

Maine

Maryland

Mass.

Michigan

Minn.

Miss.

Missouri

Montana

Nebraska

Nevada

N.H.

New Jersey

New Mexico

New York

North Carolina

North Dakota

Ohio

Oklahoma

Oregon

Penn.

Rhode Island

South Carolina

South Dakota

Tennessee

Texas

Utah

Vermont

Virginia

Wash.

West Virginia

Wisconsin

Wyoming

Each state also has a state highway system. State highways are of varying standards, capacity, and quality. Some state highways become so heavily traveled they may get upgraded to Interstate Highway standards. Others are more lightly traveled and have low capacity.

Many state highway markers are designed to suggest the geographic shape of the state or some other state symbol such as its flag. Most of the others are generically rectangular or some other neutral shape. The default design for state highway markers is the circular highway shield, which is how state highways are indicated on most maps and atlases. Currently, five states—Delaware, Iowa, Kentucky, Mississippi, and New Jersey—use the circular shield for road signage on their primary state highways.

=== Federal district and territory highways ===
Federal district and territory highway shields

American Samoa

D.C.

Guam

Northern Marianas

Puerto Rico Primary

Virgin Islands

There are also numbered highways in the District of Columbia and territories. Likewise, they may also vary in standards and quality. Similarly to five of the states, the territory of the Virgin Islands opts to use the default circular shield for road signage.

=== Secondary highways ===
Arizona Loop

Missouri Supp.

Montana Secondary

Nebraska Link

Nebraska Rec. Road

Nebraska Spur

Penn. Quadrant Route

Tennessee Secondary

Vermont Town Highway

Virginia Secondary

Texas secondary state
highway markers

Beltway

FM Road

Loop

NASA Road

Park Road

PA Road

RM Road

Rec. Road

Spur

Some states may include a secondary highway system to supplement the main one, usually for a specific purpose. For example, Texas established a system of farm-to-market roads to specifically improve access to rural areas. Nebraska has Connecting Link, Spur, and Recreation Highways to provide access to small towns and state parks. The Missouri supplemental route system was designed to provide access to most farm houses, schools, churches, cemeteries, and stores within the state.

== County highways ==
Standard County

Square variant

Clark Co., Nevada variant

West Virginia variant

Wisconsin variant

The final administrative level in some states is the county highway. As the name suggests, this type of road is maintained by a county. County roads vary widely from well-traveled multilane highways to dirt roads into remote parts of the county. In Louisiana, parish roads exist in place of county highways, as counties in that state are called parishes. Alaska also has no counties, and all roads are maintained at the national, state or municipal level. In some states, such as Massachusetts, county roads are now administered by regional entities, and both Connecticut and Rhode Island have no county government and therefore no county highways. In New York and Ohio, each county has its own style of marker for its system of county roads, creating a wide variety of county road markers across those states. In some Minnesota counties, the square sign is used to denote regular county funded highways, while the standard pentagon denotes a county state aid highway, which is partially funded and maintained by the state.

== Other systems ==
Bicycle Route

Branson, Missouri, Route

Charlotte, N.C., City Route

Forest Highway

Indian Route

Ohio Twp. road sign (Standard)

Monday Creek Twp., Ohio, variant

Allegheny Co., Penn., Belt system

Rochester, N.Y., Inner Loop

Other highway systems include:

- Forest Highway: Highways connecting U.S. National Forests to the existing state highway systems, and thus provide improved access to recreational and logging areas.
- Indian route: Highways found in several Indian reservations.
- U.S. Bicycle Route: Part of the national cycling route network in the U.S., consisting of interstate long-distance cycling routes that use multiple types of bicycling infrastructure, including off-road paths, bicycle lanes, and low-traffic roads.
- Local highways: City and local governments may have their own highways, such as the Red, Yellow, and Blue Routes in Branson, Missouri; Charlotte Route 4 in Charlotte, North Carolina; the Allegheny County Belt System in and around Pittsburgh, Pennsylvania; and the Inner Loop in Rochester, New York.
- Some townships also maintain Township Routes.
- Kentucky Parkways that traverse the state

== See also ==
- National Highway System
- New England road marking system
- Numbered highways in Canada
- Road signs in the United States
