= Kagman High School =

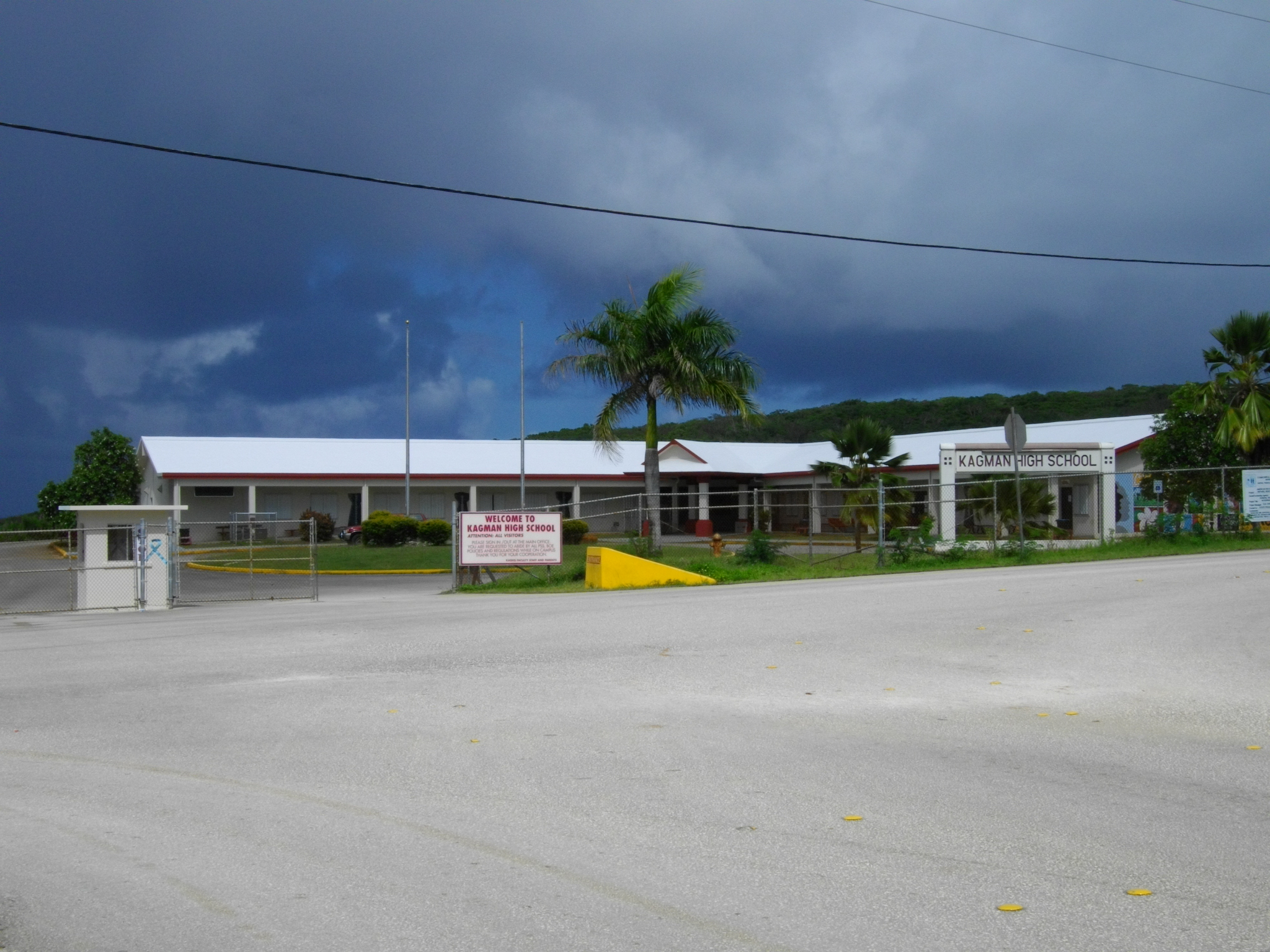

Location
- P.O. Box 501370 CK; Saipan, MP 96950; 15°10′3.75″N 145°47′4″E

Information
- School district: Commonwealth of the Northern Mariana Islands Public School System
- School code: 529-038
- Principal: Benjamin Jones Jr.
- Grades: 9 - 12
- Mascot: Ayuyu
- Website: cnmipss.org/kagman-high-school-0

Kagman High School (KHS) is one of three public high schools on Saipan, Northern Mariana Islands. It is located in Kagman, is part of the Commonwealth of the Northern Mariana Islands Public School System and opened in January 2002. KHS serves about 645 students from the villages of Kagman, north to Capitol Hill, and all the way through to Marpi.

The mascot is the Coconut Crab, also known as the Ayuyu.

== History ==
The school opened in January 2002.

== Clubs, sports, and organizations ==
- JROTC
- Chamolinian Club
- Canoe Outrigger Club/Team
- Track & Field
- Basketball
- Volleyball
- National Forensics League
- Mock Trial
- STUCO
- Music Club
- Japanese Cultural Club
- Marine Biology Club
- Million Dollar Scholars
- Korean Cultural Club

Although, there are three public high schools on Saipan, and one each on Tinian and Rota. On Saipan there are several very small private high schools. Saipan is a commonwealth of the United States of America.
