= Tinian Middle School and Tinian High School =

Location
- Canal Street, San Jose Village, Tinian, Northern Mariana Islands; 14.974678°N 145.62639709999996°E

Information
- Type: Public Secondary
- School district: CNMI Public School System
- Website: Official website

Tinian Middle and High School (TMSTHS), formerly Tinian Jr./Sr. High School (TJSHS), is a secondary school in San Jose Village on the island of Tinian in the Northern Mariana Islands.

In 1990 it became a high school. The name changed since the middle school grades (7 and 8) moved to the school in 1998.

Circa 2006 90% of the students were of Chamorro background, with the remainder being of Pacific Island and Korean backgrounds.
