= Kannat Tabla, Saipan =

Coordinates: 15°09′49″N 145°43′55″E

Kannat Tabla is a settlement in Saipan, Northern Mariana Islands. It is located on the middle of the island. It uses UTC+10:00 and its highest point is 374 feet. It has a population of 705 (2020 census). To its north, there is the town of Chalan Kiya, to its south, there is the town of As Terlaje, and to its east there is the town of San Vincente.
