= Laulau, Saipan =

Coordinates: 15.1628°N 145.7452°E

Laulau is a settlement in Saipan, in the Northern Mariana Islands. It is located on the central east coast of the island, close to Laulau Beach, at the northern end of Magicienne Bay. Though fairly isolated, the beach is a popular attraction. The village is connected by road with San Vicente, which lies to the south.
