= As Matuis, Saipan =

Coordinates: 15°15′04″N 145°47′06″E

As Matuis is a village on Saipan in the Northern Mariana Islands. It is located on the north side of the island, with San Roque to its south. It uses UTC+10:00 and its highest point is 249 feet. It has 536 inhabitants (2020 census).
