= Laolao Bay =

Coordinates: 15.143°N 145.757°E

Laolao Bay (also spelled Lao Lao, Laulau, or Lau Lau; meaning shake, vibrate, quiver, totter or tremble in Chamorro and sometimes referred to as Magicienne Bay) is a large bay on the southeast side of Saipan in the Northern Mariana Islands.

== Geography ==
Laolao Bay covers nearly one sixth of the island's east coast, from Dandan in the south to Kagman cape to the northeast. The village of San Vicente lies along the center of the bay's coast.

"Laulau Bay village" is also the name a U.S. census-designated place (CDP) located along part of the bay's coastline. According to the 2010 census, it had a population of 226.

The Laolao Bay area is often simply referred to by the local population as "Laolao." However, a differentiation should be noted between Laolao Bay and "Chalan Laulau", the latter being another CDP located along the coast of the west side of the island, in the neighborhood known as Oleai (which itself is also known as San Jose).

=== Course ===
Laolao Bay --> Philippine Sea --> Pacific Ocean
