= Saipan Southern High School =

Location
- Koblerville, Saipan, Northern Mariana Islands; 15.1207375°N 145.70714199999998°E

Information
- Type: Public high school
- School district: CNMI Public School System
- Grades: 9 - 12
- Website: cnmipss.org/school/saipan-southern-high-school

Saipan Southern High School (SSHS) is a senior high school in Koblerville, Saipan, Northern Mariana Islands. It is a part of the CNMI Public School System.

It opened in fall 2002.
