= Mount Tapochau =

Mountain in Saipan, Northern Mariana Islands

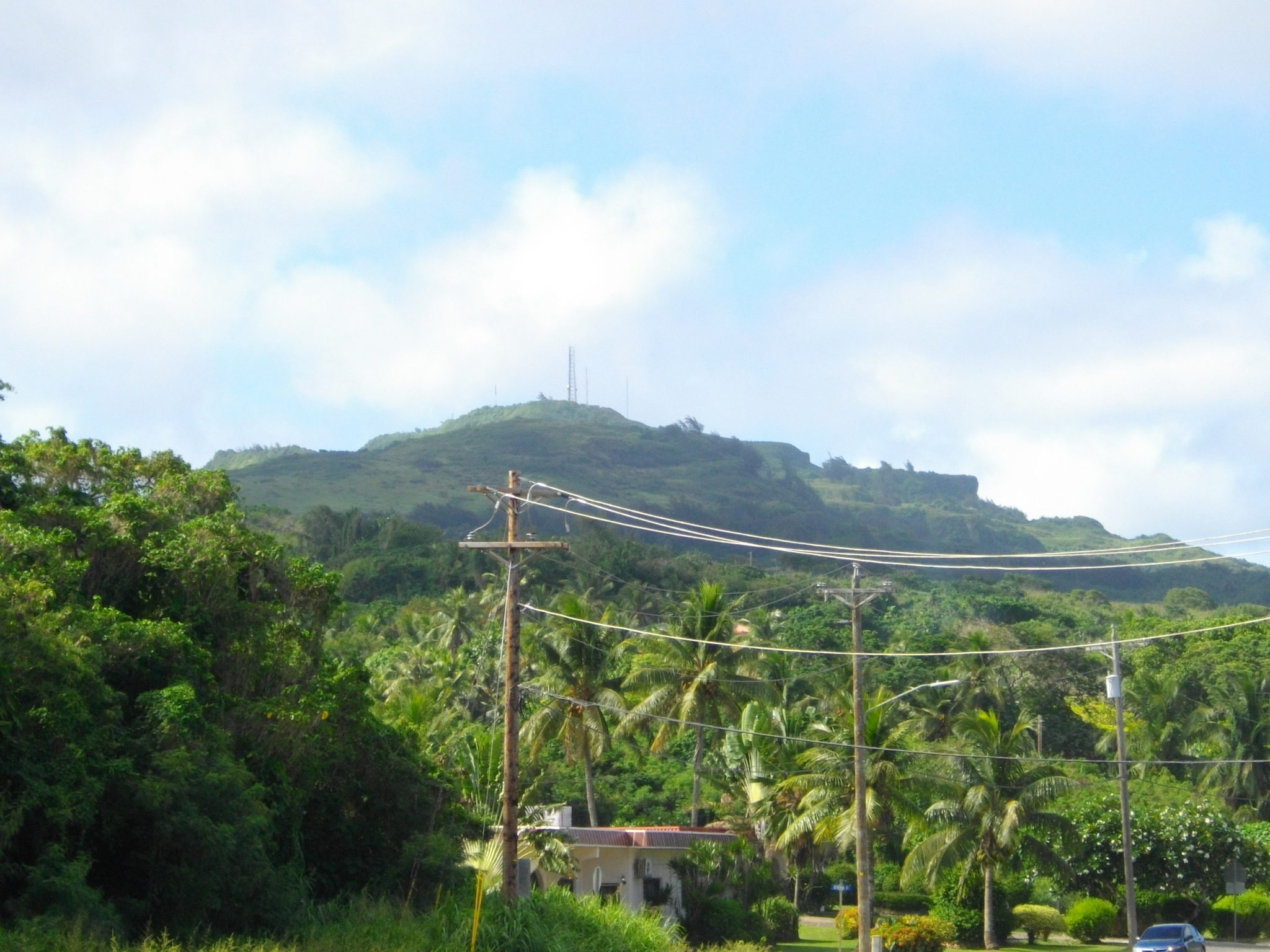

Highest point
- Elevation: 474 m (1,555 ft)
- Prominence: 474 m (1,555 ft)
- Coordinates: 15°11′20″N 145°44′35″E

Geography
- Location: Saipan, Northern Mariana Islands

Mount Tapochau is the highest point on the island of Saipan in the Northern Mariana Islands. It is located in the center of the island, north of San Vicente village and northwest of Magicienne Bay. It rises to a height of 474 m (1,555 ft), and offers an unhindered view of the entire island. It played a vital role as a key observation post during the Battle of Saipan in the Second World War.

== History ==
In 1521, Ferdinand Magellan discovered the Mariana Islands along with the mountain. In 1899, Germany purchased part of the islands known as German Micronesia, including the island where Taptochau is located. During the First World War, Japan took possession of the islands. During the Second World War, Taptochau served as a key observation point during the Battle of Saipan in June–July 1944. The summit is equipped with informational waysides detailing the fighting during the war. After the United States gained the Mariana Islands after the war, they became part of the United Nations Trust Territory of the Pacific Islands, in 1947. In 1986, it became part of the commonwealth of Northern Marianas.

== Geography ==
Tapochau is a mountain and the highest point on the island of Saipan in the Northern Mariana Islands. It is located in the center of the island, north of San Vicente village and northwest of Magicienne Bay. It rises to a height of 474 m (1,555 ft), and offers an unhindered view of the entire island. The only way up to Mount Tapochau is a long, winding uphill road made of loose rocks, followed by a set of concrete stairs to the top.

== Geology ==
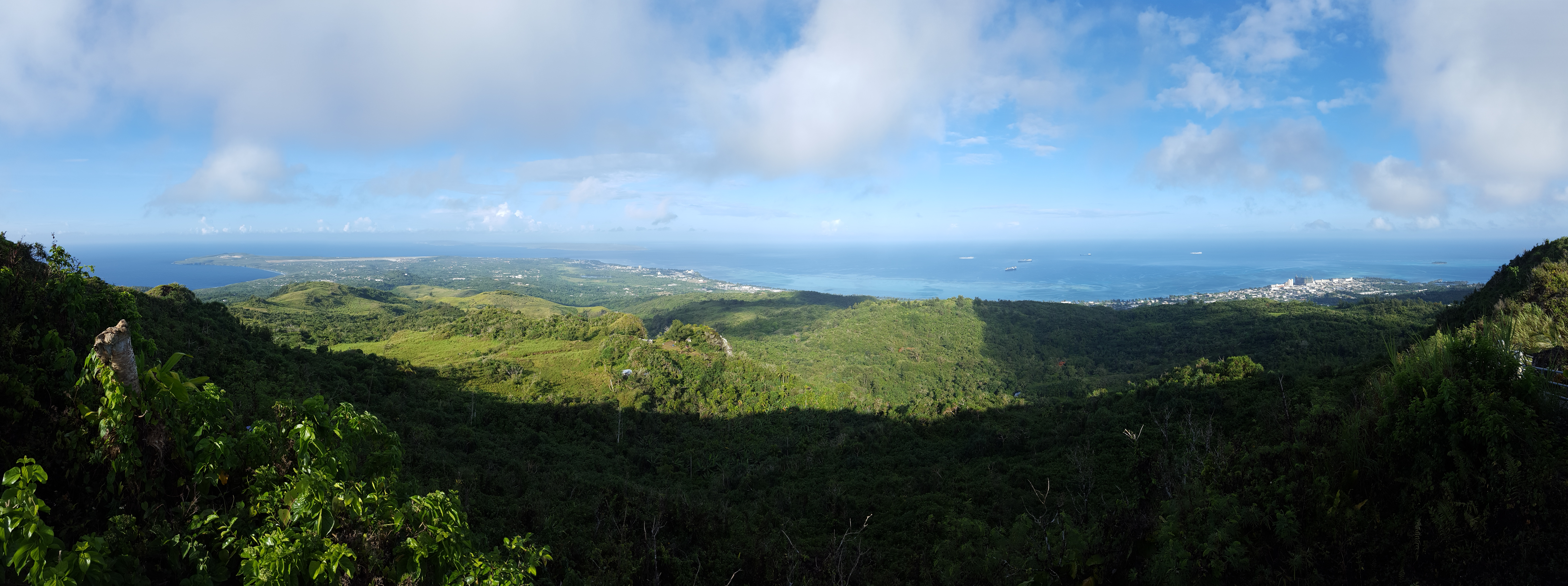
A panorama taken from the top of Mount Tapochau. In the distance to the left is Tinian; to the right is Garapan

Mount Tapochau is geologically rich and sits atop various mineral deposits. It is predominantly composed of madrepore limestone, a type of stony coral that forms reefs in tropical seas, and coral limestone, made from compacted tiny sea shells. These rocks indicate the marine geological origins of the mountain. At the base of the mountain, there are deposits of coral limestone, manganese ore, sulphur, and phosphate, minerals typically formed in or near bodies of water like the Western Pacific, where the Northern Mariana Islands are located. These sedimentary rocks result from processes like shell consolidation in shallow seas or sea-floor mineral accumulation.
