= As Terlaje, Saipan =

Settlement in Saipan, Northern Mariana Islands

Coordinates: 15°09′22″N 145°43′26″E

As Terlaje is a settlement in Saipan, Northern Mariana Islands. It is located on the middle of the island. It uses UTC+10:00 and its highest point is 233 feet. It has a population of 288 (2020 census). To its north, there is the town of Chalan Kiya, and to its east there is the town of Kannat Tabla.
