= Afetnas, Saipan =

Village in the Northern Mariana Islands

Coordinates: 15°07′38″N 145°41′53″E

Afetnas is a village on Saipan in the Northern Mariana Islands. It is located on the west side of the island, across from Pacific Islands Club Resort, with San Antonio to its northwest and Koblerville to its southeast. It uses UTC+10:00 and its highest point is 23 feet. It has 1,130 inhabitants (2020 census).
