= State Library of the Commonwealth of the Northern Mariana Islands =

State Library

Joeten-Kiyu Public Library
- 15.157956856270172°N 145.70516063959664°E
- Location: Saipan, Northern Mariana Islands

Other information
- Website: https://www.cnmilib.org/

Joeten-Kiyu Public Library is the state library of the Commonwealth of the Northern Mariana Islands.

Branches:

- Joeten-Kiyu Public Library (JKPL) - Susupe, Saipan
- Antonio C. Atalig Memorial Rota Public Library - Songsong, Rota
  - The current library was built circa 2002 but it did not open until its "soft" opening on February 26, 2012. It was named after Mayor of Rota Antonio C. Atalig. It adopted its current name in 1981.
- Tinian Public Library - San Jose Village, Tinian

== See also ==
- Guam Public Library System
- List of libraries in the United States
