= Saipan International School =

Coordinates: 15.1367°N 145.7216°E

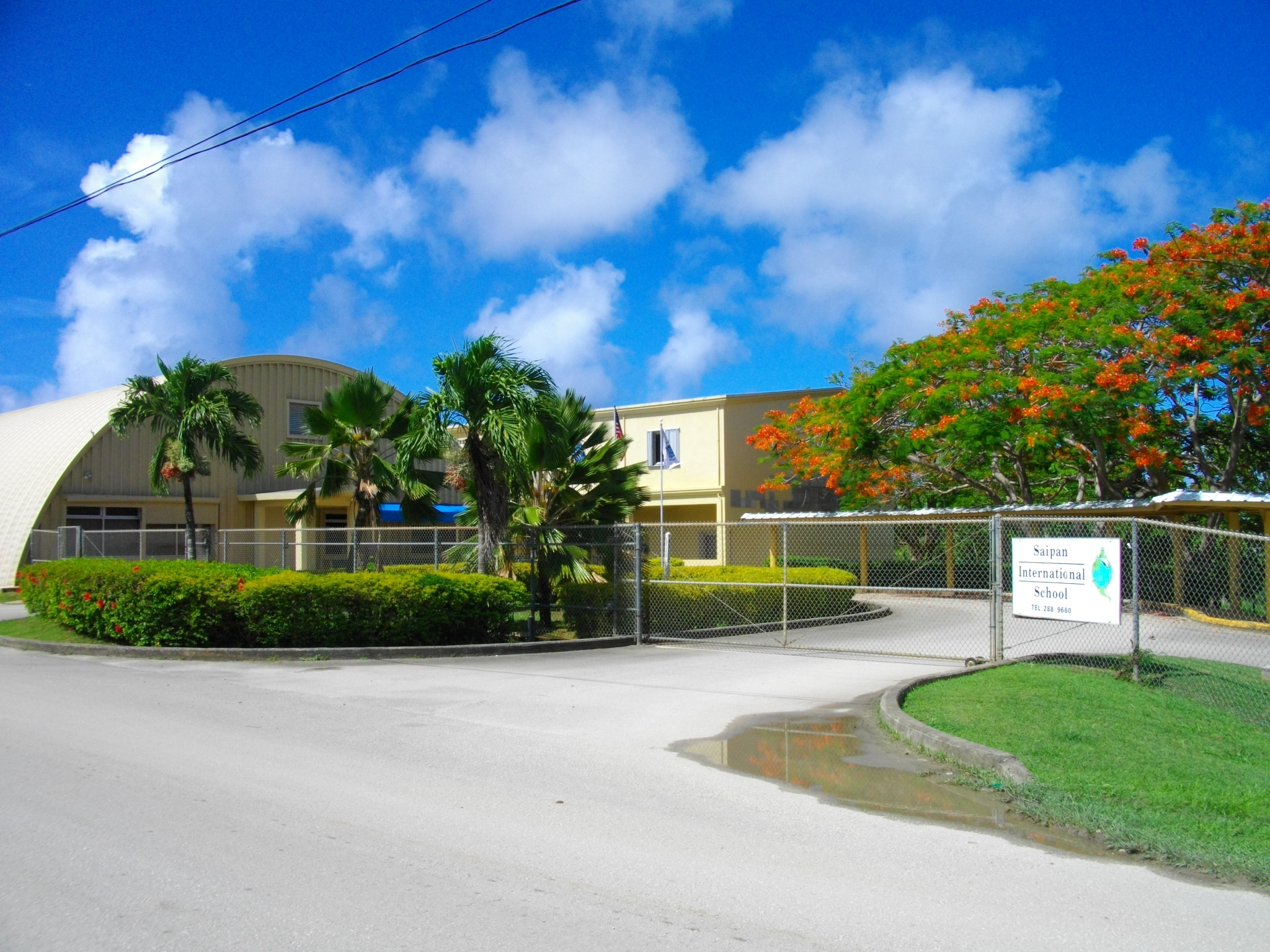

Location
- Route 37, Chalan Kanoa, Saipan, Northern Mariana Islands; Saipan; Northern Mariana Islands

Information
- Established: 1994
- CEEB code: 529046
- Headmaster: Dr. Ronald Snyder
- Colors: Blue and White
- Athletics conference: Commonwealth Coalition of Private Schools Sports Association (CCOPSSA)
- Mascot: SIS Geckos
- Accreditation: ACS WASC
- Website: saipaninternationalschool.com

Saipan International School (SIS) is an independent, not-for-profit international school located on the island of Saipan, Northern Mariana Islands. Founded in 1994, SIS has approximately 250 students enrolled in Pre-K through 12th grade, making it one of the larger private schools and the only international school in the Commonwealth.

== Academics ==
SIS follows an American-based curriculum and culminates with the largest assortment of Advanced Placement exams in the Commonwealth. Additionally, SIS was the first school in Micronesia authorized to offer the AP Capstone Diploma. Many students also qualify for the prestigious distinction of AP International Diploma. The school has various signature programs including competitive Mathematics and competitive Speech and Debate integrated directly into the school day, as well as a rich selection of electives allowing students the ability to explore areas of study that they are passionate about. Foreign languages (Chinese / Spanish).

SIS students have found great success in their academic endeavors, winning distinctions such as the Questbridge Scholars, National Merit Scholar, Presidential Scholar Award, and many AP Scholars, AP Scholars with Honors, AP Scholars with Distinction.

== Activities and athletics ==
SIS students participate in multiple clubs, sports, and other activities including National Honor Society, Mock Trial, National Speech and Debate Association, Model United Nations, FRC (FIRST Robotics Competition), Rotary International's Interact Club, the International Thespian Society, etc.

SIS is a founding member of the Commonwealth Coalition of Private Schools Association (CCOPSA) which comprises most of the private schools in the Commonwealth. Through CCOPSA and its participation with local sports federations, SIS students participate in basketball, cross country, speech and debate, math court, mock trial, soccer, swimming, track and field, volleyball. The school co-founded the Run For the Coconut, an annual Cross Country Meet with Saipan Community School, and the Commonwealth's first cross country invitational, the Gecko 5000. SIS hosts several annual events for the entire community, including The Health Heart Walk, International Thanksgiving, the Spring Musical and many more.

== History ==
In the early 1990s, a group of parents desiring a quality educational program for their children combined efforts to form a new school. They wanted to create an environment that fostered academic, emotional, and social growth in each child. The school year started with 45 students, preschool through sixth grade.

Enrollment increased the following year. The original building in San Jose would not accommodate the children for the 1995–1996 school year. Members of the school leased a site in As Lito from Victoria Vaughan to build a new school. In August 1995, classes started with 114 students, preschool through seventh grade.

In 1998, a new four-classroom building was constructed to accommodate the ever-growing student population. To provide the students of SIS with the best resources possible, a new science lab and media center were added to this building in the spring of 2001. An additional classroom was built in the summer of 2002 to meet the needs of the growing student population. A new building to house grades 9 through 12 was completed in January 2008. Following the devastation of Super Typhoon Yutu, the school undertook a revitalization of the campus, expanding existing structures and adding several gardens and outdoor areas, including a stocked Tilapia pond.
