= Achugao, Saipan =

Coordinates: 15°14′37″N 145°45′58″E

Achugao is a village on Saipan in the Northern Mariana Islands. It is located on the north side of the island, with San Roque to its north. It uses UTC+10:00 and its highest point is 59 feet. It has 222 inhabitants (2020 census).
