= Carolinas Heights =

Village in the Northern Mariana Islands

Coordinates: 14°58′0″N 145°39′0″E

Carolinas Heights is a village on Tinian, Northern Mariana Islands. The 2020 census recorded the population as 22.

== History ==
In the Battle of Tinian, on July 31, 1944, the last Japanese forces on the island were compressed to Carolinas Heights, with Tinian being secured the next day on August, 1.
