= Marpi, Saipan =

Coordinates: 15°15′57″N 145°47′38″E

Marpi is a settlement in Saipan, Northern Mariana Islands. It is located on the north of the island. It uses UTC+10:00 and its highest point is 305 feet. It has a population of 85.
