= San Jose, Saipan =

San Jose
- Settlement
- Location within Northern Mariana Islands
- Coordinates: 15°10′00″N 145°42′32″E
- Territory: Northern Mariana Islands
- Elevation: 3 ft (0.91 m)

Population (2012)
  - Total: 985

San Jose is a settlement (sometimes termed a village or district) on the island of Saipan in the Northern Mariana Islands.
