= Gualo Rai, Saipan =

Gualo Rai
- Settlement
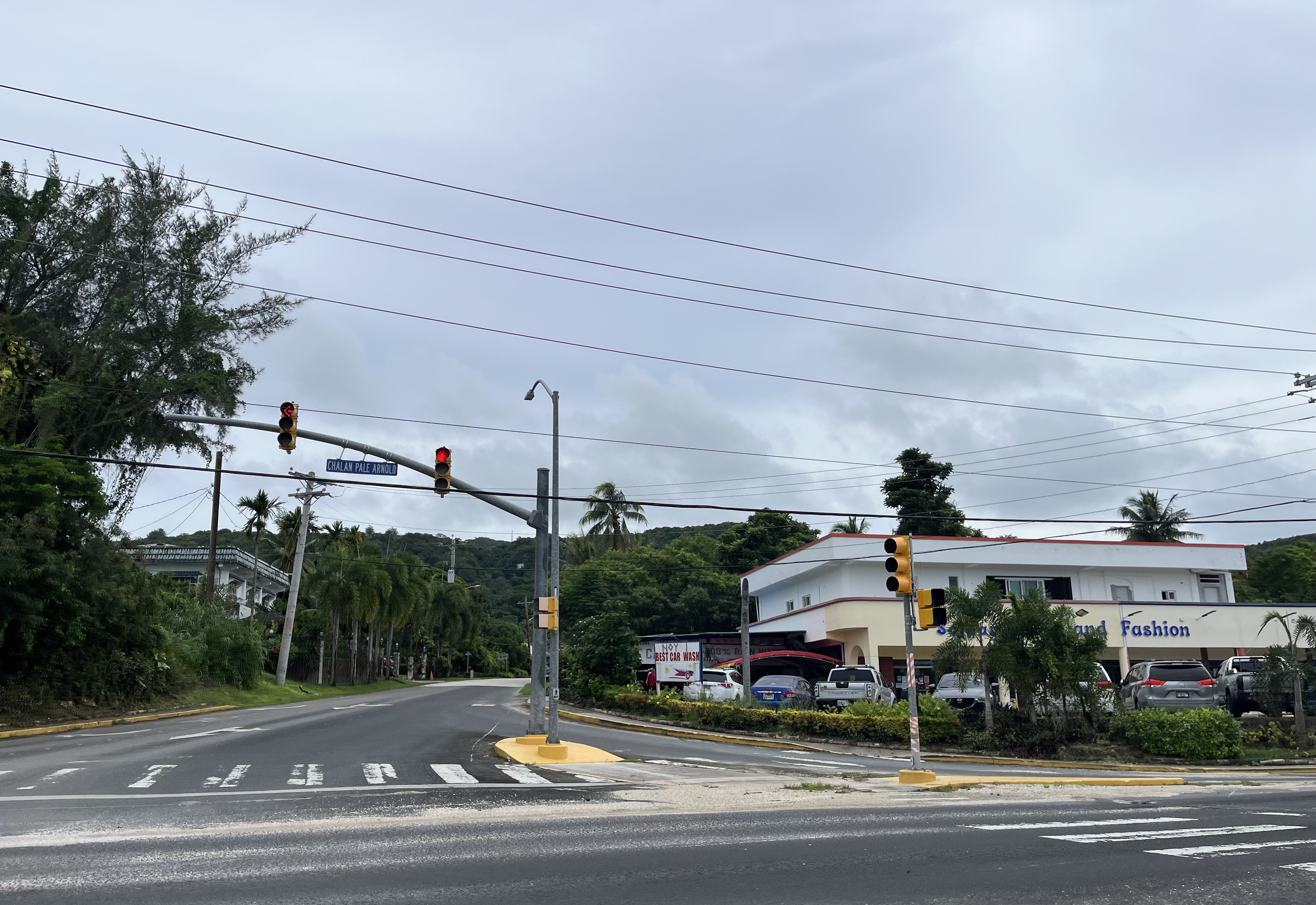

- Location within Northern Mariana Islands
- Coordinates: 15°11′27″N 145°43′21″E
- Territory: Northern Mariana Islands
- Elevation: 112 ft (34 m)

Population (2020)
  - Total: 1,841

Gualo Rai is a settlement (sometimes termed a village or district) on the island of Saipan in the Northern Mariana Islands.
