= San Roque, Saipan =

Coordinates: 15.2489°N 145.7734°E

San Roque is a settlement in Saipan, in the Northern Mariana Islands. It is located to the north of Tanapag on the island's northwest coast, close to the point where the barrier reef protecting the Tanapag Harbor joins to the island. It is connected to Tanapag by the Marpi Road (Highway 30), which runs the length of the northwestern coast.

== Education ==
Commonwealth of the Northern Mariana Islands Public School System operates local public schools. Gregorio T. Camacho Elementary School is located in San Roque. It opened as the San Roque Elementary School in 1951 and was renamed after the first commissioner of San Roque, Gregorio T. Camacho. Camacho served as the president of the school's parent-teacher association.
