= Chalan Piao, Saipan =

Village on the southwestern area of Saipan

Chalan Piao
- Village
- Location within Northern Mariana Islands
- Coordinates: 15°8′31.92″N 145°42′2.88″E
- Country: Commonwealth of the Northern Mariana Islands
- Island: Saipan

Chalan Piao is a large village on the southwestern area of Saipan, Commonwealth of the Northern Mariana Islands. It is bordered on the north by Chalan Kanoa, on the east by As Perdido village and on the south by San Antonio village. To the west is the Pacific Ocean.

"Chalan Piao" translated from the Chamorro language means bamboo road. Chalan means road and piao means bamboo. The Chamorro language is spoken by the indigenous inhabitants of Saipan and the rest of the Mariana Islands, mainly Rota/Luta, Tinian and Guahan/Guam.

== History ==
Chalan Piao likely started as a marine embayment and then became a sandy beach with a brackish marsh. It is one of the earliest human settlements in the Marianas, being occupied c. 1731–1226 BC. Archaeological evidence from this period include redware pottery with lime-filled decorations.

== Education ==
Commonwealth of the Northern Mariana Islands Public School System operates local public schools. Hopwood Junior High School is located in Chalan Piao.
