= San Antonio, Saipan =

Village on Saipan, Northern Mariana Islands

Coordinates: 15.132500°N 145.693611°E

San Antonio is a settlement in Saipan, in the Northern Mariana Islands. It is close to the southwestern tip of the island. Once a separate village, it is now virtually contiguous with other nearby villages on Beach Road (Highway 33), including Susupe, Chalan Kanoa and Chalan Piao.

== Education ==
Commonwealth of the Northern Mariana Islands Public School System operates local public schools. San Antonio Elementary School was located in San Antonio.
