= Tanapag, Saipan =

Tanapag
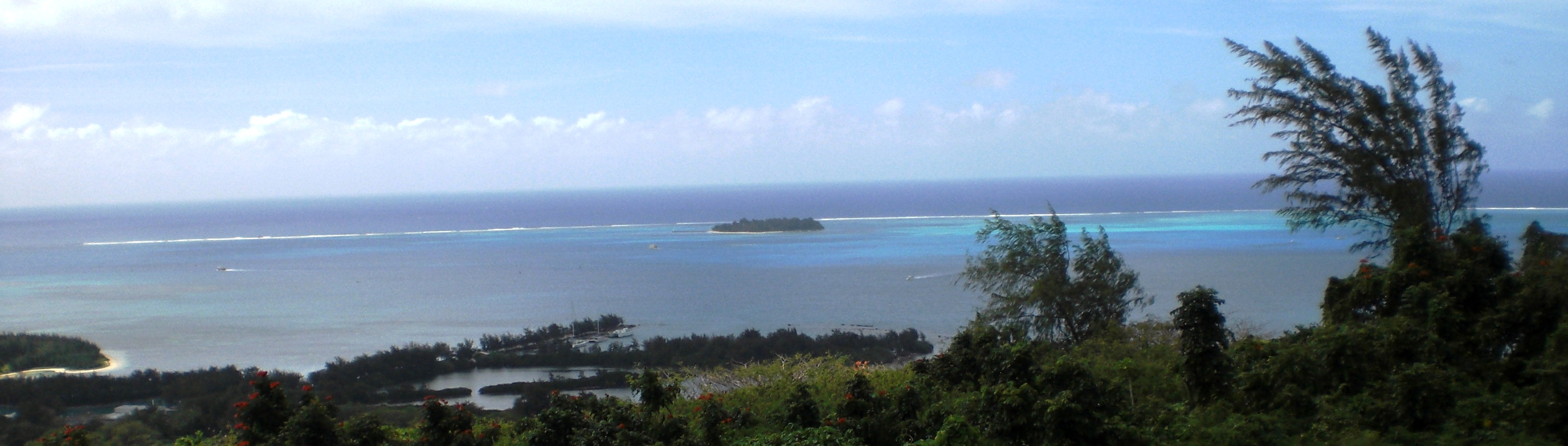
- Tanapag Lagoon

- Location within Northern Mariana Islands
- Coordinates: 15°14′20.4″N 145°45′21.6″E
- Country: Northern Mariana Islands
- Island: Saipan

Tanapag is a settlement on the island of Saipan in the Northern Mariana Islands. It is located close to Tanapag Beach on the northwest coast, just to the north of Capital Hill, the island group's center of government. It lies on the Marpi Road (Highway 30), which stretches the length of the island's northwest coast.

The area around Tanapag Beach was the site of major fighting during the Battle of Saipan in 1944.

== Education ==
Commonwealth of the Northern Mariana Islands Public School System operates local public schools. Tanapag Middle School is in Tanapag. Tanapag Elementary School was located in Tanapag.

== See also ==
- Maritime Heritage Trail - Battle of Saipan
