= Chalan Kiya, Saipan =

Chalan Kiya
- Settlement
- Location within Northern Mariana Islands
- Coordinates: 15°09′48″N 145°43′02″E
- Territory: Northern Mariana Islands
- Elevation: 23 ft (7.0 m)

Population (2020)
  - Total: 1,033

Chalan Kiya is a settlement (sometimes termed a village or district) on the island of Saipan in the Northern Mariana Islands.
