= Susupe, Saipan =

Village in Saipan

Coordinates: 15.1609°N 145.7061°E

Downtown Susupe looking towards the Joeten Kiyu Public Library in front, the Marianas Business Plaza in the back (largest office building in the CNMI), and (not pictured) the Joeten Downtown Susupe Shopping Center to the right

Susupe (Old Japanese name: 鈴部町, Suzubu-chō) is a village, and the second-largest village, on the island of Saipan, Northern Mariana Islands. Susupe is also known as Susupi. As of 2020, its population is 1,840, down from 2,083 in 2000.

== Judicial capital of the CNMI ==
Capitol Hill is the seat of government for the Commonwealth, but the judicial branch is headquartered at the House of Justice in Susupe. Despite Susupe's considerable distance from Capitol Hill, both settlements are officially located within the municipal boundaries of Saipan, and neither settlement has any official status.

If one considers Capitol Hill and not Saipan as a whole to be the capital of the Commonwealth, this makes the CNMI one of three U.S. jurisdictions whose supreme courts are not located in the capital proper. The other two are California, whose capital is Sacramento but whose Supreme Court is in San Francisco, and Louisiana, whose capital is Baton Rouge but whose Supreme Court is in New Orleans.

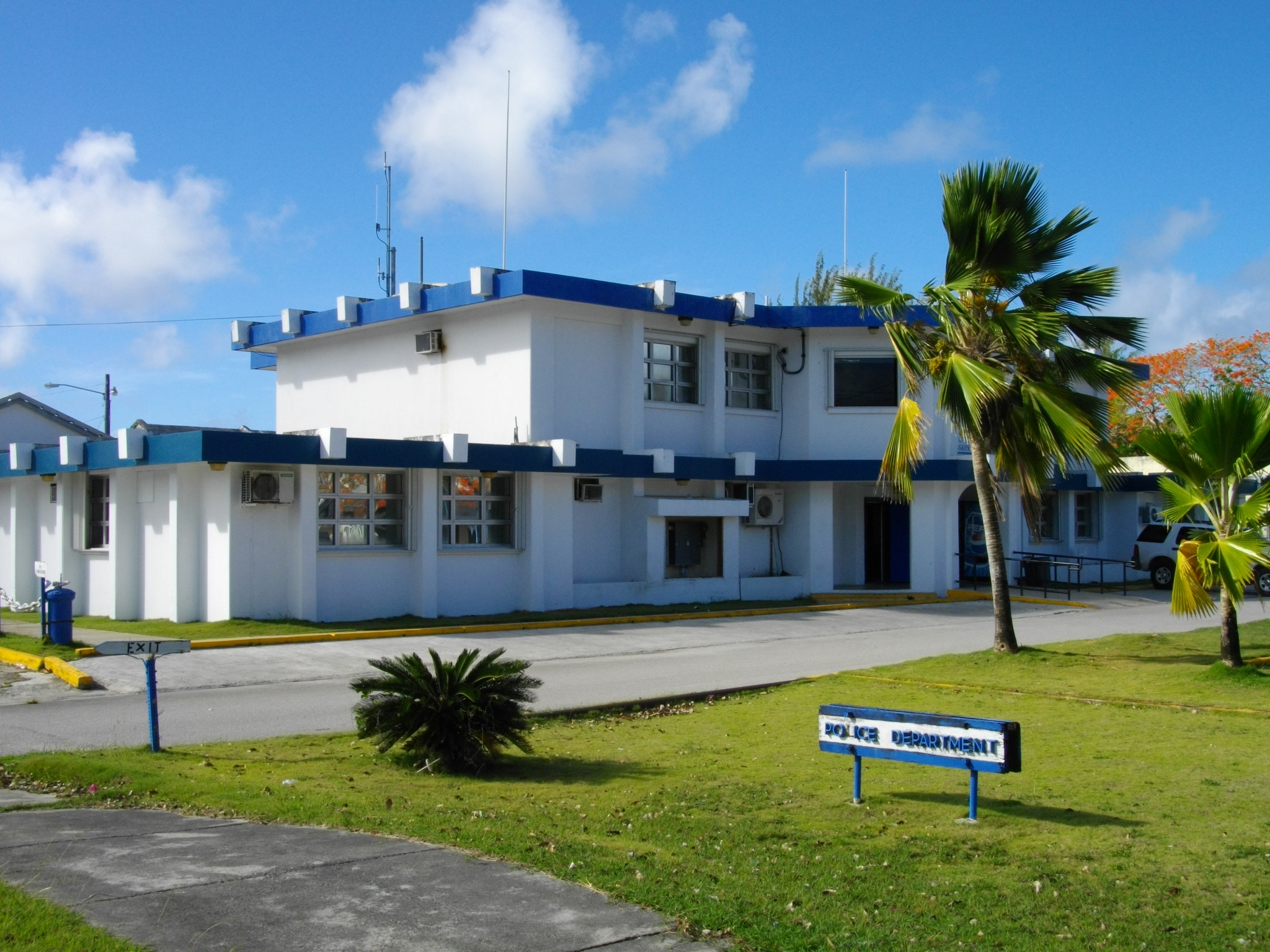
Northern Mariana Islands Department of Public Safety Police Division Building in Susupe

== Education ==
Commonwealth of the Northern Mariana Islands Public School System, which is headquartered in Susupe, serves the town. Marianas High School is located in Susupe, across the street from the House of Justice.

Joeten-Kiyu Public Library (JKPL) of the State Library of the Commonwealth of the Northern Mariana Islands is in Susupe.

== Tourism ==
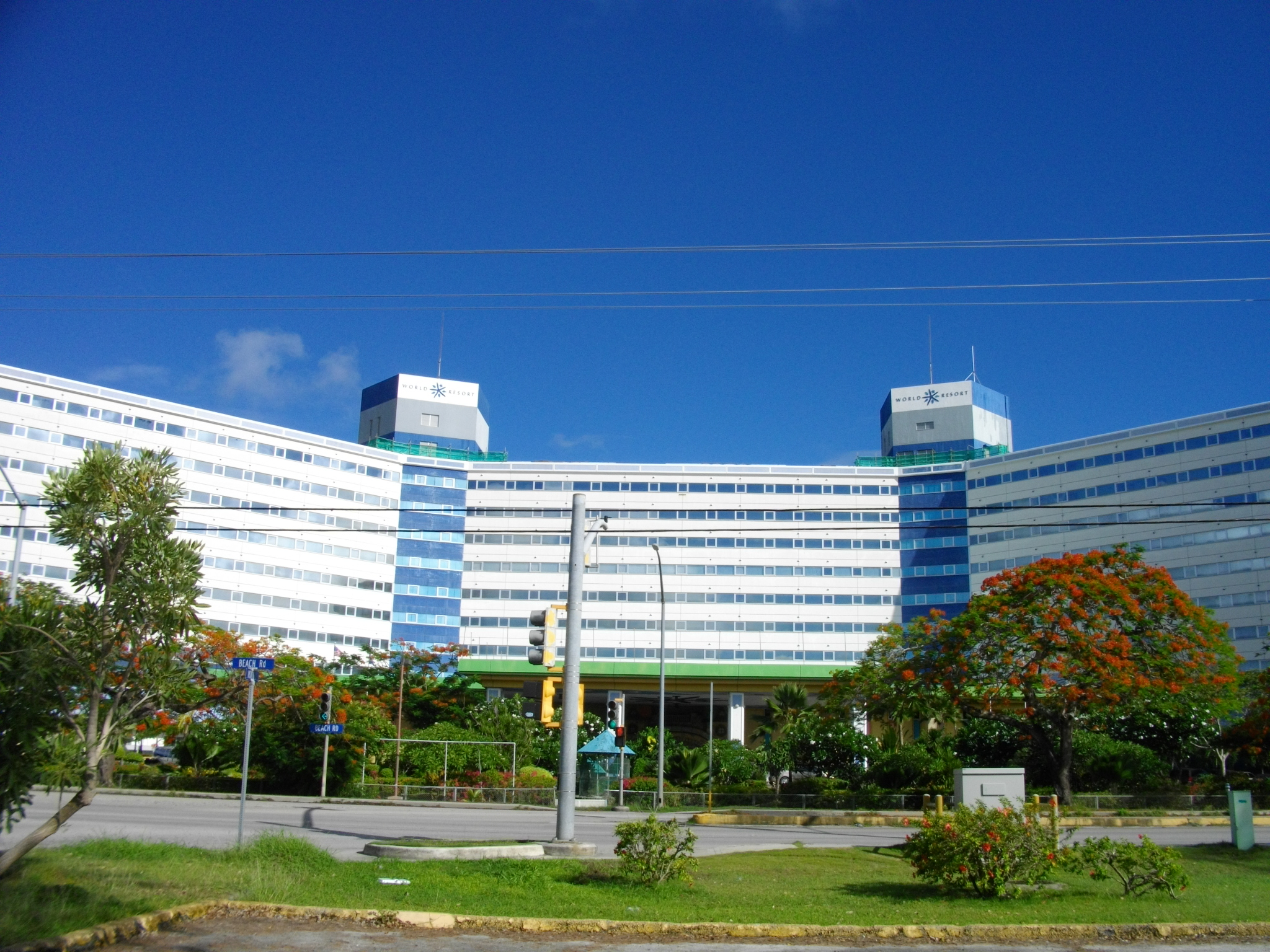
Saipan World Resort

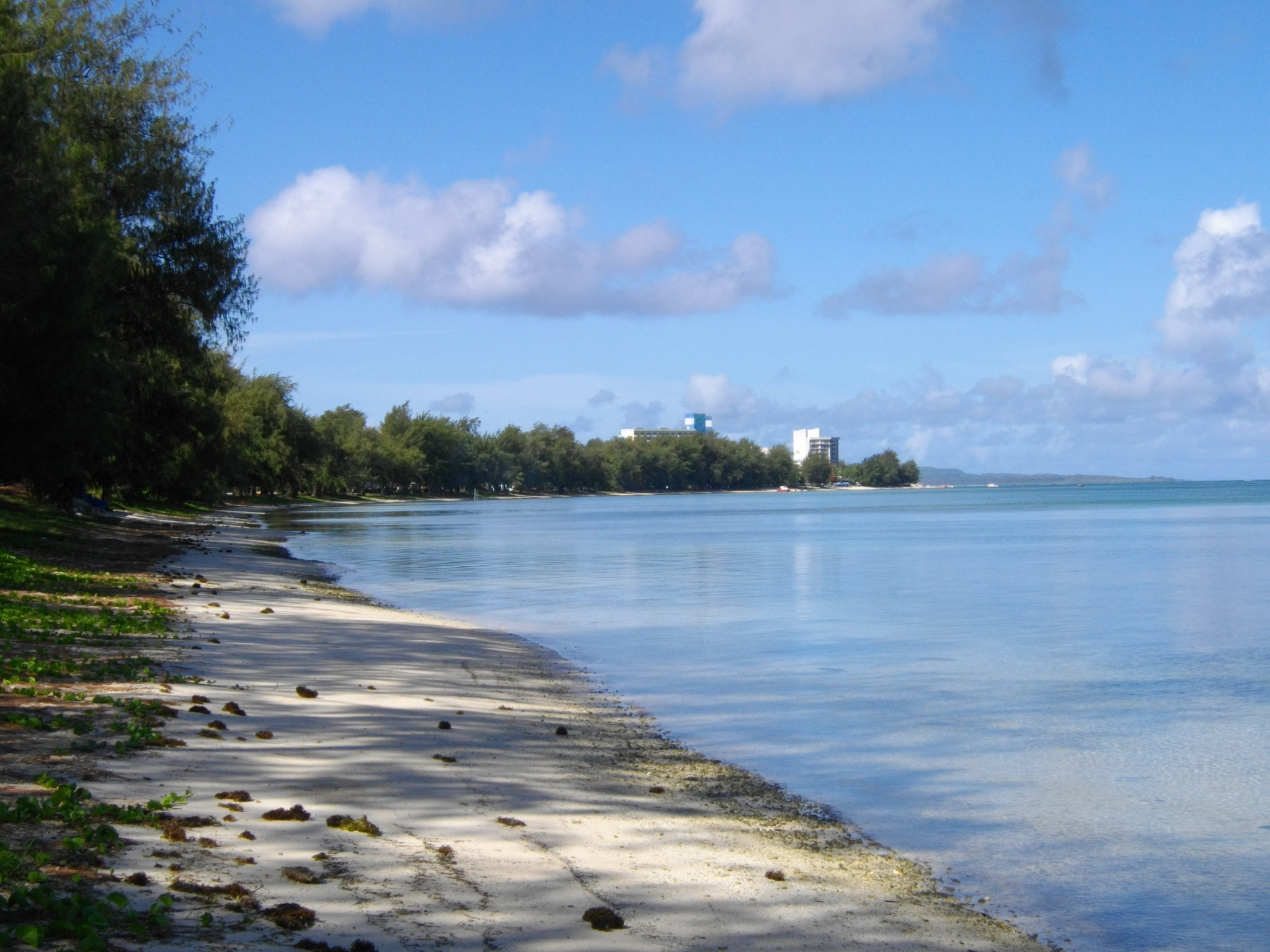
Kilili Beach

Three major hotels serve the Susupe area and its surrounding neighborhoods. (Several little hotels also provide the area with more affordable options.)

- Kanoa Resort Saipan (formerly Grand Hotel)
- Aquarius Beach Tower
- Saipan World Resort (formerly Diamond Hotel)

== Lake Susupe ==
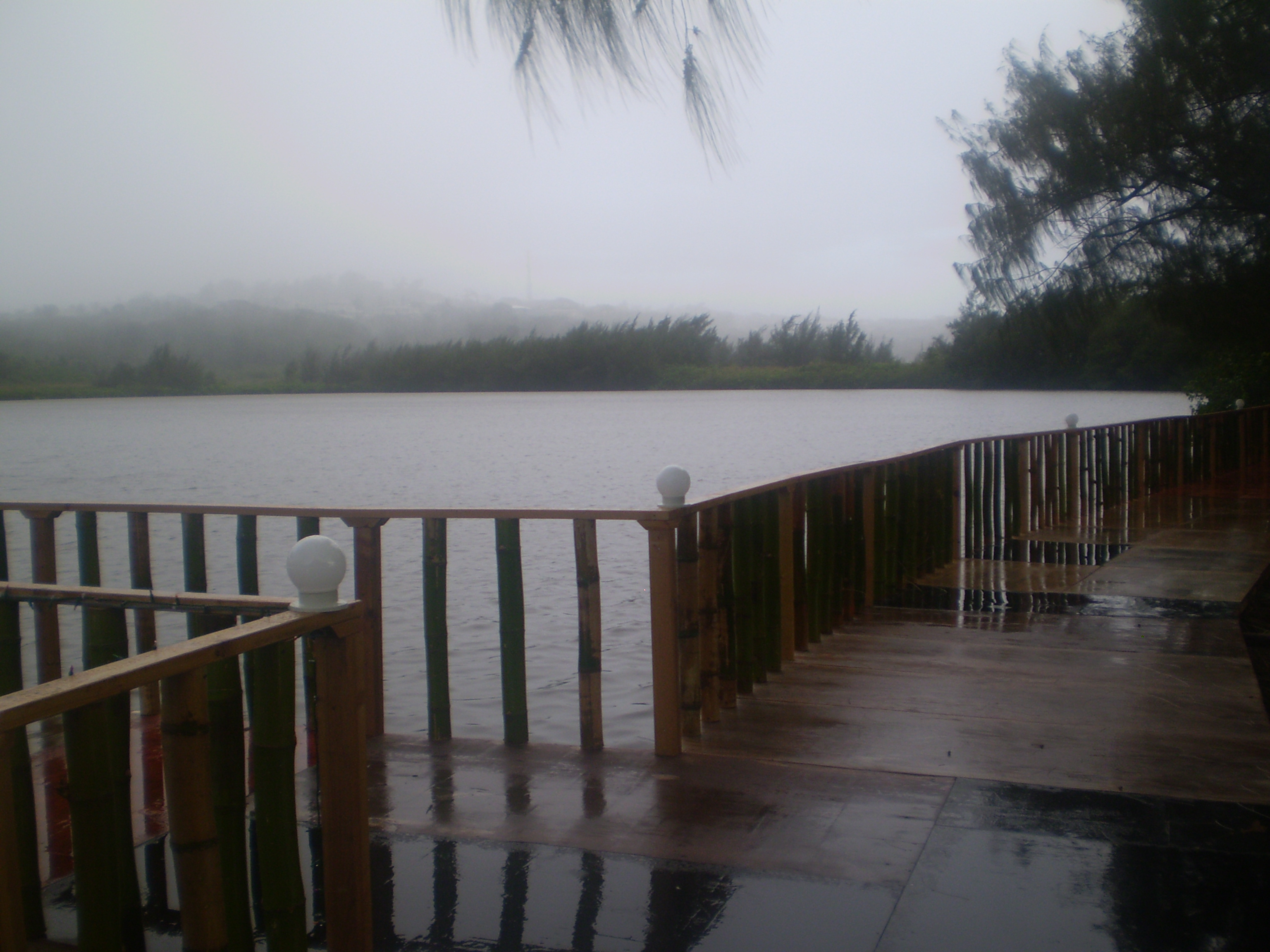
Lake Susupe pier looking towards the southern end of the island

Lake Susupe is the only lake in Saipan and is located in the village of Susupe. It is home to a few species of birds found only in the Marianas. One of the endangered birds, the Mariana common moorhen, has a Saipan population of 30–40. It is unknown what natural trees grew here because they were cleared in the 1930s to make room for sugar cane fields and the native fish died when the tilapia was introduced in the 1960s. Today, large ironwood trees grow and, in some places, very thick 6-foot-tall (1.8 m) reeds. There are also 17 little ponds around the lake. The ponds and even the lake are home to very large fancy-tail guppies. The lake is often visited by birds from Asia which migrate to Lake Susupe during the winter.
