= San Vicente, Saipan =

Village on Saipan in the Northern Mariana Islands

Coordinates: 15°09′13″N 145°44′24″E

San Vicente is a village on Saipan in the Northern Mariana Islands. It is located on the eastern side close to the shore of Magicienne Bay, to the south of the island's highest point, Mount Tapochau. It is connected via the cross-island road to Susupe in the west and with Capitol Hill and Tanapag to the north.

== Education ==
Commonwealth of the Northern Mariana Islands Public School System operates local public schools. San Vicente Elementary School is located in San Vicente.
