= Kagman, Saipan =

Kagman
- Settlement
- Location within Northern Mariana Islands
- Coordinates: 15°10′00″N 145°46′43″E
- Territory: Northern Mariana Islands
- Elevation: 230 ft (70 m)

Population (2012)
  - Total: 4,230

Kagman is a settlement (sometimes termed a village or district) on the island of Saipan in the Northern Mariana Islands.
