= Capitol Hill, Saipan =

Capitol Hill Nakayama
- Settlement
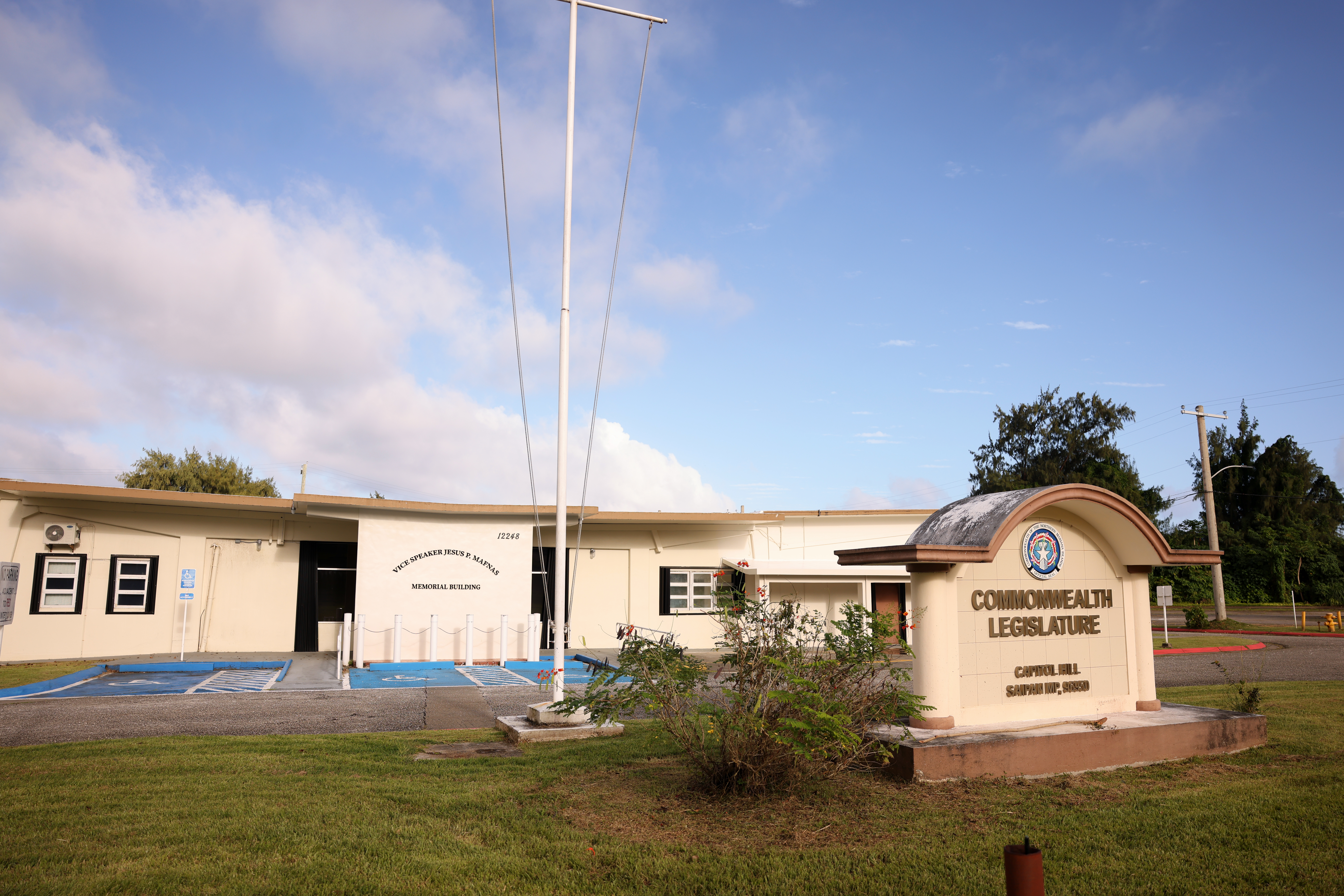
- Commonwealth of the Northern Mariana Islands Legislature Building at Capitol Hill

- Location within Northern Mariana Islands
- Coordinates: 15°12′00″N 145°45′07″E
- Territory: Northern Mariana Islands

Area
  - Total: 1.48 sq mi (3.8 km^{2})

Population (2020)
  - Total: 979
  - Density: 661/sq mi (255/km^{2})
- Website: www.gov.mp

Capitol Hill (Former Japanese name: 中山, Nakayama; sometimes spelled Capital Hill, formerly Army Hill under the United States Navy) is a settlement (sometimes termed a village or district) on the island of Saipan in the Northern Mariana Islands. It has a population of around 1,000. Capitol Hill has been the territory's seat of government since 1962. It lies on the cross-island road between Tanapag and San Vicente.

Capitol Hill was built in 1948 by the Central Intelligence Agency as a base for covert training of Nationalist Chinese guerrillas.

The area is home to various government departments and agencies:

- Governor's Office
- Commonwealth of the Northern Mariana Islands Legislature Building
- US Post Office
- Commonwealth of the Northern Mariana Islands Department of Commerce
- Commonwealth of the Northern Mariana Islands Workforce Investment Agency
- Commonwealth of the Northern Mariana Islands Council for Arts and Culture

== Transportation ==
Route 31 (Cross Island Road) or Isa Drive is the main road in the area.

== Climate ==
Climate data for Capitol Hill 1, Northern Mariana Islands (1991–2020 normals, extremes 1995–present)
Month	Jan	Feb	Mar	Apr	May	Jun	Jul	Aug	Sep	Oct	Nov	Dec	Year
Record high °F (°C)	88 (31)	89 (32)	89 (32)	91 (33)	92 (33)	89 (32)	91 (33)	89 (32)	90 (32)	89 (32)	90 (32)	88 (31)	92 (33)
Mean daily maximum °F (°C)	80.9 (27.2)	80.6 (27.0)	81.7 (27.6)	83.3 (28.5)	84.6 (29.2)	85.1 (29.5)	84.6 (29.2)	84.0 (28.9)	84.0 (28.9)	83.9 (28.8)	83.7 (28.7)	82.1 (27.8)	83.2 (28.4)
Daily mean °F (°C)	77.0 (25.0)	76.6 (24.8)	77.3 (25.2)	78.6 (25.9)	80.0 (26.7)	80.3 (26.8)	79.8 (26.6)	79.5 (26.4)	79.3 (26.3)	79.3 (26.3)	79.3 (26.3)	78.1 (25.6)	78.8 (26.0)
Mean daily minimum °F (°C)	73.1 (22.8)	72.7 (22.6)	72.9 (22.7)	73.8 (23.2)	75.3 (24.1)	75.5 (24.2)	75.0 (23.9)	74.9 (23.8)	74.6 (23.7)	74.7 (23.7)	74.8 (23.8)	74.1 (23.4)	74.3 (23.5)
Record low °F (°C)	68 (20)	67 (19)	62 (17)	63 (17)	66 (19)	70 (21)	62 (17)	67 (19)	64 (18)	67 (19)	68 (20)	68 (20)	62 (17)
Average precipitation inches (mm)	4.57 (116)	4.16 (106)	3.12 (79)	4.20 (107)	4.04 (103)	5.35 (136)	9.62 (244)	14.06 (357)	11.90 (302)	12.25 (311)	8.27 (210)	6.02 (153)	87.56 (2,224)
Average precipitation days (≥ 0.01 in)	19.3	18.0	15.8	17.9	19.2	22.3	25.4	26.5	24.2	24.7	22.4	22.1	257.8
Source: NOAA

== See also ==
- List of capitals in the United States
