= Chalan Kanoa, Saipan =

Settlement on Saipan, Northern Mariana Islands

Coordinates: 15.1489°N 145.7017°E

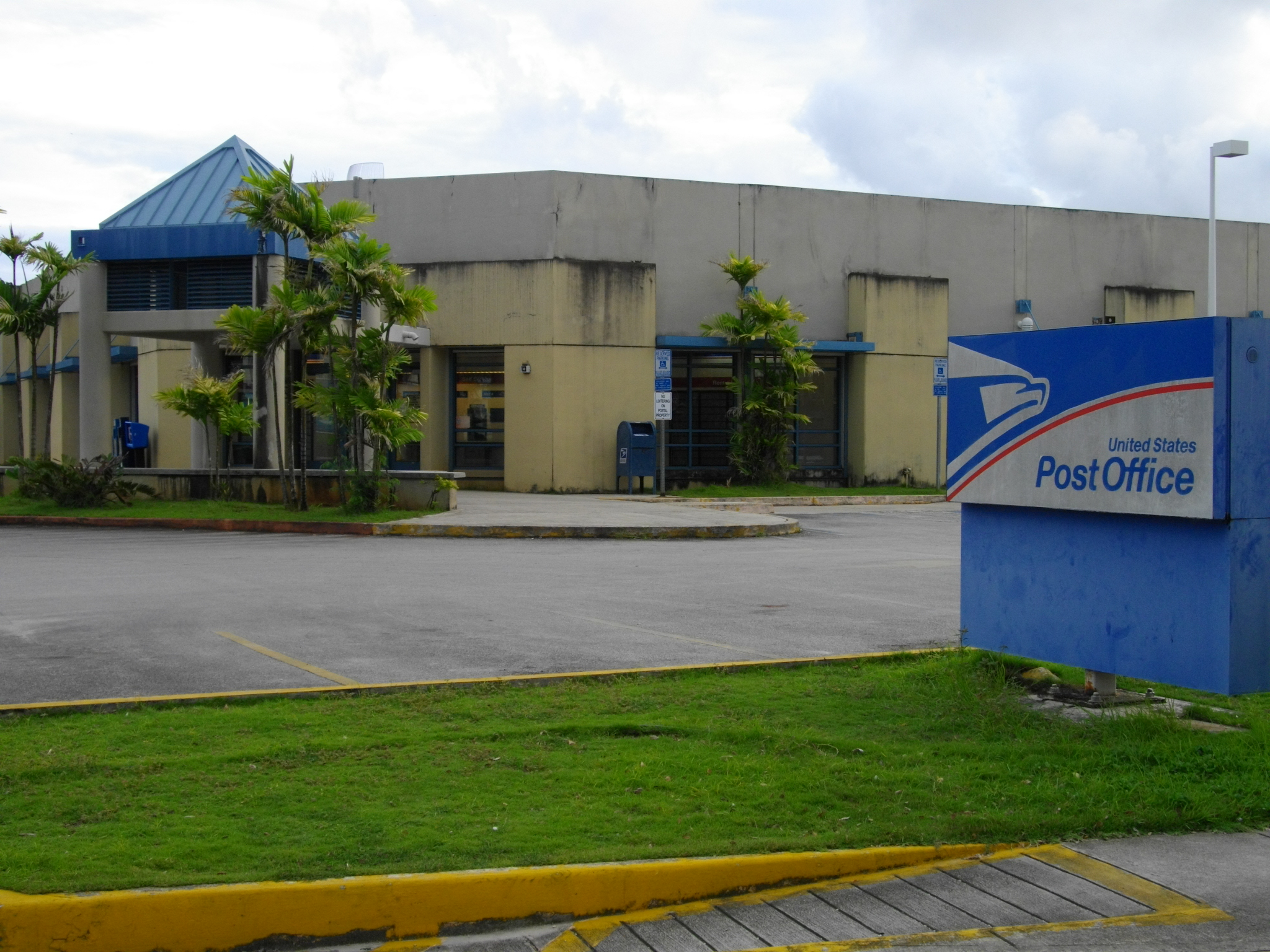
Chalan Kanoa Post Office

Chalan Kanoa (Old Japanese name: 茶覧, Charan) is one of the settlements on Saipan, the largest of the Northern Mariana Islands. After World War II it became the largest settlement on the island.

== History ==
Chalan Kanoa was established as a company town for sugar mill workers. The name of the settlement means "canoe road". Chalan Kanoa was spared destruction during the Battle of Saipan compared to Garapan, which was completely destroyed.

Our Lady of Mount Carmel is the patron saint of Chalan Kanoa.

== Population ==
The population of Chalan Kanoa surged after all of the other settlements were destroyed during World War II. It was the largest settlement in Saipan in 1950. 3,845 of the island's 4,925 inhabitants lived in Chalan Kanoa and the second-largest settlement was San Antonio with 290 people.

In 1947, five satellite villages (Tanapag, Oleai, As Lito, Susupe, and San Antonio) were created in order to disperse Chalan Kanoa's population.

The Chamorro and Carolinian people inhabit the area.

== Politics ==
All four precincts in Chalan Kanoa gave over 90% of their votes in support of the 1975 Northern Mariana Islands status referendum.

== Education ==
In 1950, the school in Chalan Kanoa was the only school on the entire island.

Commonwealth of the Northern Mariana Islands Public School System operates local public schools. William S. Reyes Elementary School is located in Chalan Kanoa. It is named after the CNMI's first superintendent of education, William Sablan Reyes. It was established as the Findley School for Native Children in 1946 and was later renamed to Chalan Kanoa Elementary School. It received its current name in 1984.

== Works cited ==
=== Books ===
- Willens, Howard; Siemer, Deanne (2002). An Honorable Accord: The Covenant between the Northern Mariana Islands and the United States. University of Hawaiʻi Press. ISBN 9780824823900.

=== Jouranls ===
- Spoehr, Alexander (1954). "Saipan: The Ethnology of a War-Devastated Island". Fieldiana. Anthropology. 41. Field Museum of Natural History: 325–383. doi:10.2307/29782331. JSTOR 29782331.
