= Dandan, Saipan =

Dandan
- Settlement
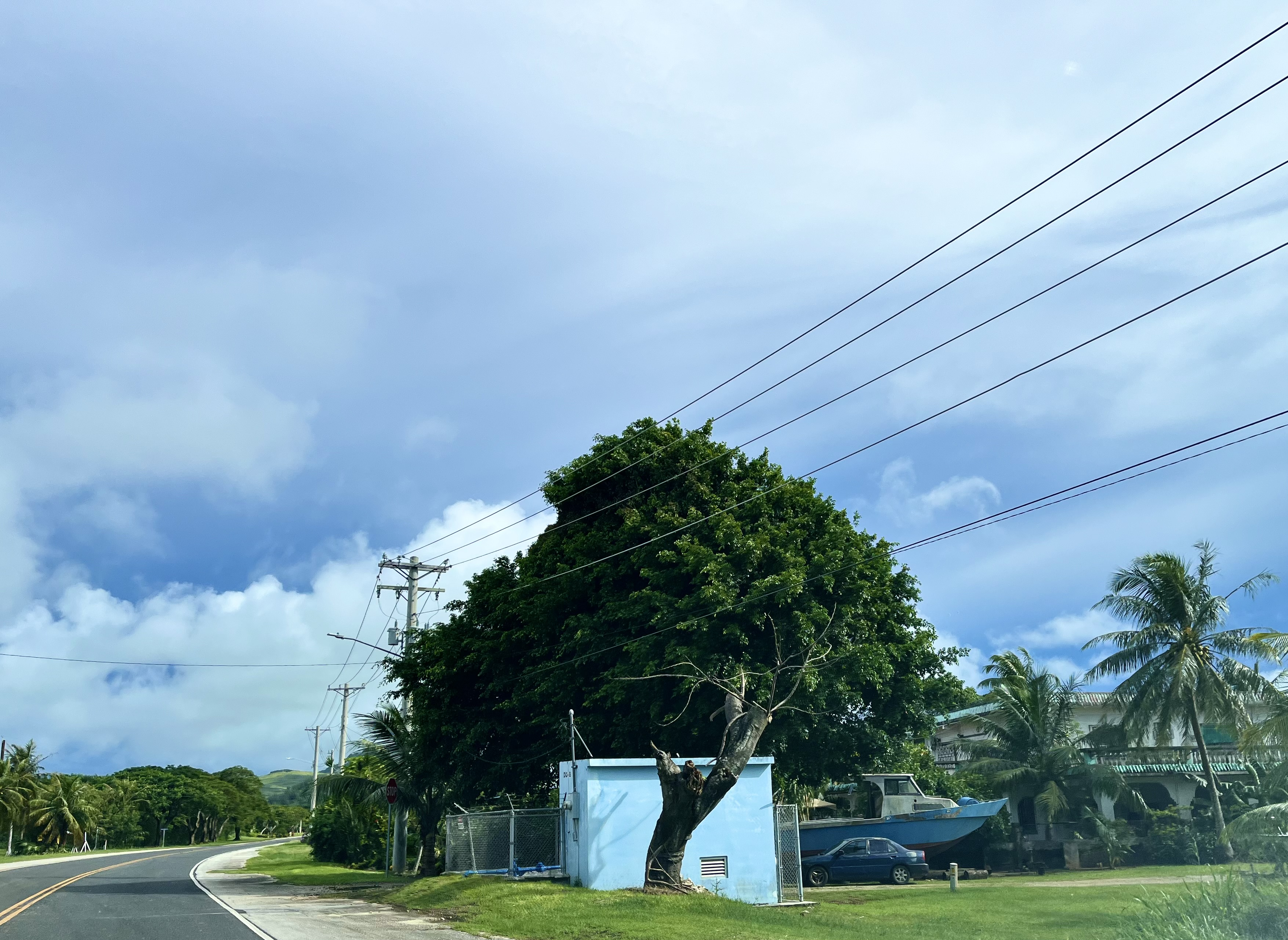

- Location within Northern Mariana Islands
- Coordinates: 15°7′48″N 145°44′1″E
- Territory: Northern Mariana Islands
- Elevation: 236 ft (72 m)

Population (2020)
  - Total: 2,922

Dandan is a highly populated settlement (sometimes termed a village or district) on the island of Saipan in the Northern Mariana Islands. As of 2020 it had a population of 2,922.
