= San Jose, Tinian =

Village in Tinian, Northern Mariana Islands

Coordinates: 14.9711°N 145.6259°E

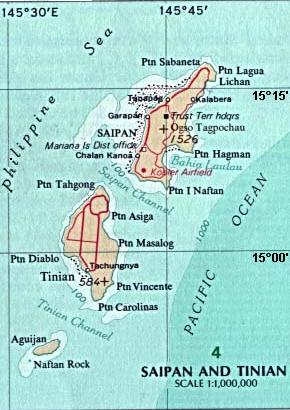
Map Saipan and Tinian islands, San Jose is labeled Tachungnya after the Tachungnya Bay at San Jose

Map of the Battle of Tinian in 1944, San Jose labeled "Tinian Town"

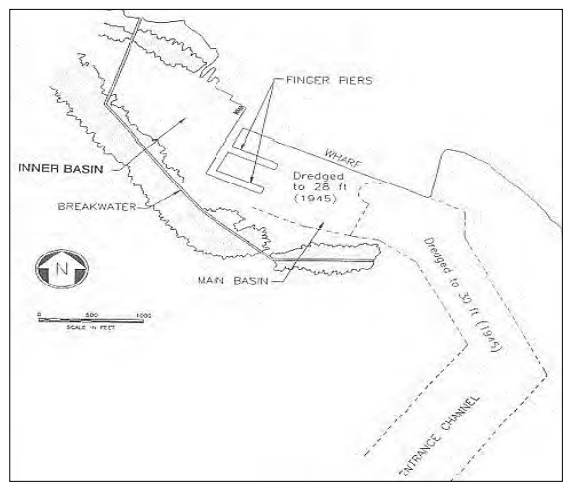
Tinian Harbor, also called San Jose Harbor, built by US Navy Seabees

San Jose is the largest village on the island of Tinian, in the Northern Mariana Islands. It is located on the south coast of the island, close to the island's main harbor and three beaches: Kammer Beach, Taga Beach, and Tachogña Beach (Tachungnya).

Now home to most of Tinian's population of about 3,136 (2010), San Jose is close to the site of a much larger ancient village of the Chamorro culture, which may have housed 12,000–15,000 people.

The main roads in San Jose are 8th Ave and Broadway. Just north of the City of San Jose is the neighborhood Marpo Heights. Carolinas Heights neighborhood is just east of the city of San Jose. Tachogña Beach (Tachungnya) is just south of the city. Tinian International Airport is 4.2 km north of San Jose. Kammer Beach is in the City of San Jose, next to the harbor. Taga Beach is south of the city, next to Tachogña Beach.

During World War II the US Navy Seabees built, as part of the Tinian Naval Base, Tinian Harbor, also called San Jose Harbor, which is still in use today. They also constructed Broadway and 8th Avenue, named after Broadway and 8th Avenue in Manhattan. US Navy and US Army often called San Jose Tinian Town. Most of the city of San Jose was destroyed in the battle of Tinian and then rebuilt.
