= Koblerville, Saipan =

Koblerville
- Settlement
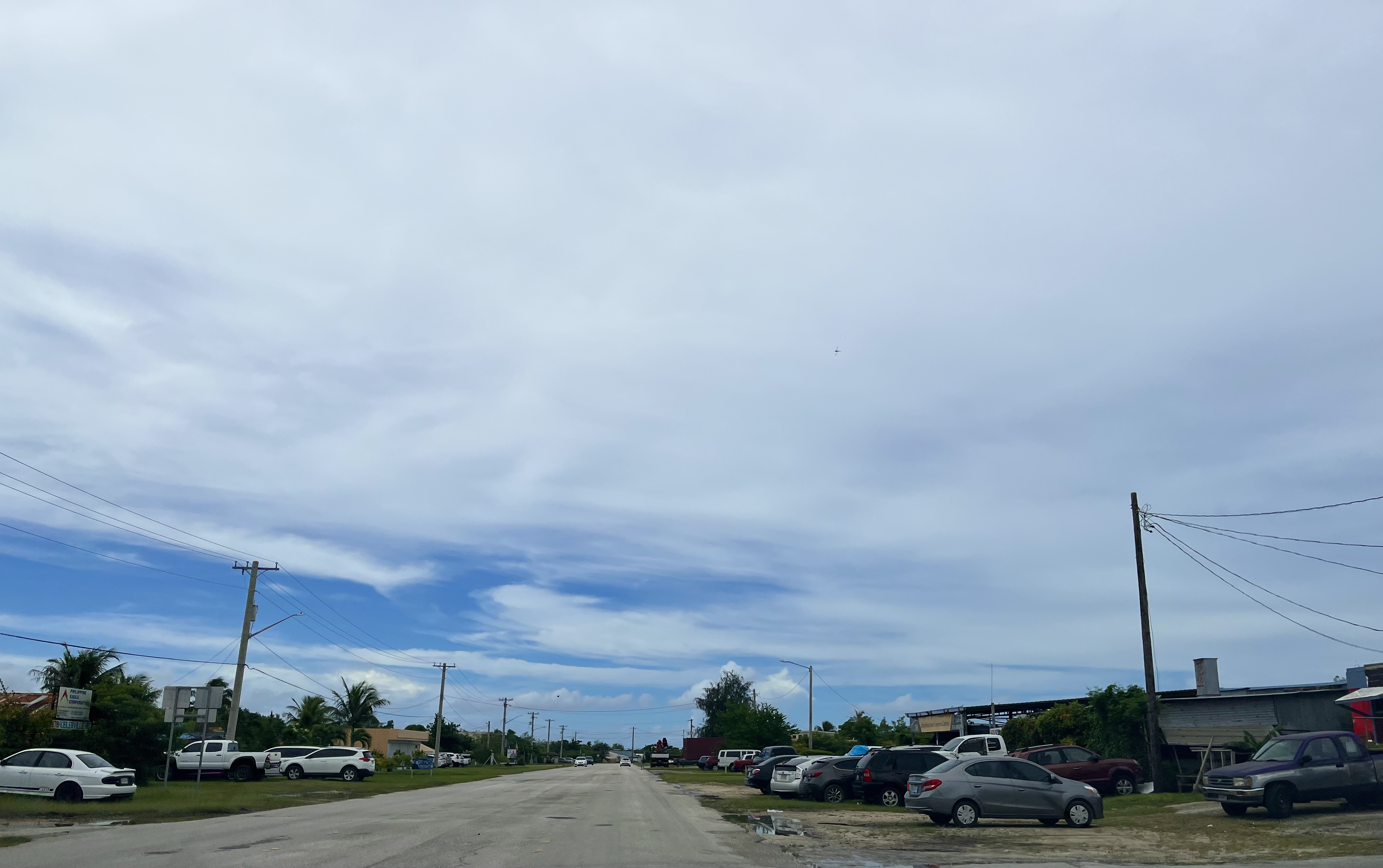

- Location within Northern Mariana Islands
- Coordinates: 15°07′14″N 145°42′23″E
- Territory: Northern Mariana Islands
- Elevation: 230 ft (70 m)

Population (2020)
  - Total: 2,470

Koblerville is a settlement (sometimes termed a village or district) on the island of Saipan in the Northern Mariana Islands.
