= Marpi Point Field =

- Saipan, Northern Mariana Islands
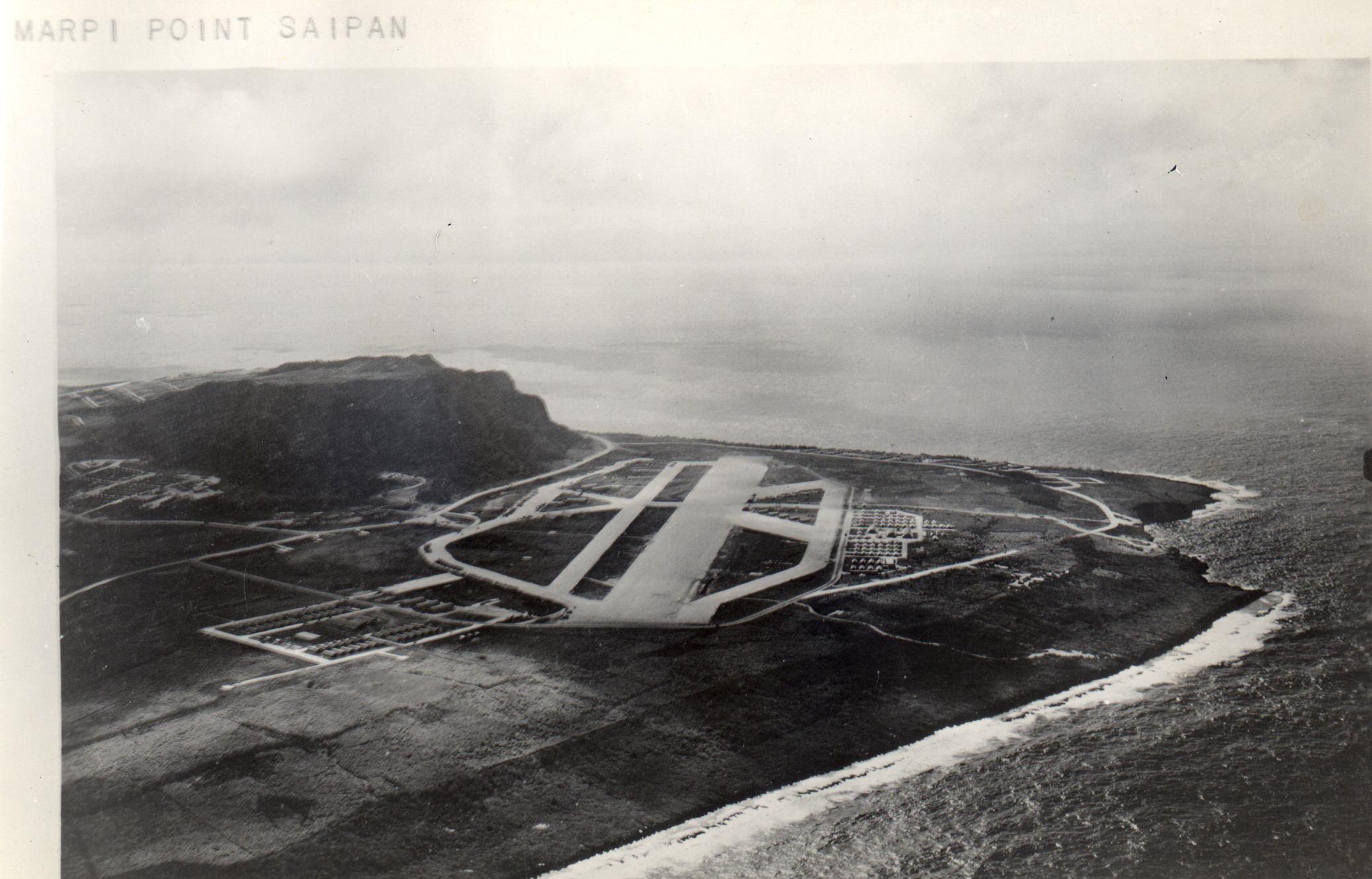
- Aerial view of Naval Air Base Marpi Point, Saipan, Mariana Islands

Site information
- Type: Military airfield
- Controlled by: United States Navy
- Condition: abandoned

Location
- Coordinates: 15°16′50″N 145°48′56″E

Site history
- Built: 1944
- Built by: Imperial Japanese Navy Air Service/Seabees
- In use: 1944–1962
- Materials: coral

Marpi Point Field or NAB Marpi Point is a former World War II airfield at the northern end of Saipan in the Northern Mariana Islands. The airfield was vacated by the United States in 1962; it is currently unused and overgrown.

== History ==
=== World War II ===
In March 1944 the Imperial Japanese Navy Air Service ordered the construction of an airfield near Marpi Point on the northern end of the island of Saipan as part of a general plan to improve defenses in the Marianas. The 4,500-foot (1,400 m) airfield was planned to handle 24 aircraft, but was still incomplete at the time of the U.S. invasion in June 1944. During the battle work on the runway continued to allow for the planned airlift of Japanese reinforcements to Saipan; however, this plan was abandoned when it became apparent that U.S. naval and airpower made this unfeasible. On 9 July 1944 the 24th Marines secured Marpi Point and the airfield, while the 25th Marines secured the northeast end of the island. Saipan was declared secure at 16:15 on 9 July.

Aircraft from VMO-2 were the first American airplanes to land at Marpi Point Field.

The US Navy took possession of Marpi Point Field and the 51st Naval Construction Battalion and Construction Battalion Maintenance Unit (CBMU) 614 expanded the existing 4,500-foot (1,400 m) runway to 7,000 feet (2,100 m) and built a second 3,500-foot (1,100 m) runway, becoming part of Naval Advance Base Saipan. The field was renamed as NAB Marpi Point.

VMF-512 flying F4Us operated from NAB Marpi Point from October to December 1945. Carrier Aircraft Service Unit 47 (CASU-47) was based at the field during 1945. CBMU-616 was based at NAB Marpi Point from 17 August until 3 October 1945.

On 23 September 1945 USAAF Lockheed F-5G Lightning #44-26855 was written off while landing at NAB Marpi Point.

==== Mass suicides of Japanese soldiers and civilians ====
Towards the end of the Battle of Saipan in 1944, hundreds of Japanese civilians and Imperial Japanese soldiers jumped to their deaths at two locations flanking Marpi Point Field: Banzai Cliff and Laderan Banadero. Japanese propaganda had emphasized American brutality, citing the mutilation of Japanese war dead and claiming that U.S. soldiers were thus bloodthirsty and without morals. Many Japanese feared the "American devils raping and devouring Japanese women and children."

The precise number of suicides committed there is not known. One eyewitness said he saw “hundreds of bodies” below the cliff, while elsewhere, numbers in the thousands have been cited. A contemporary correspondent praised these civilians, describing them as "the pride of Japanese women" and their self-sacrifice as "the finest act of the Shōwa period."

=== Postwar ===
Postwar the entire northern region of Saipan was called NAS Tanapag and home to the U.S. Navy's Technical Training Unit (NTTU), a CIA cover. It purportedly was used for training of anti-communist spies and guerilla forces. The area was returned to civilian control in 1962.

== Current status ==
The airfield has become overgrown with vegetation and few traces of its former use remain. The Banzai Cliff memorial is located at the western end of the former airfield. The former airfield is part of the National Historic Landmark District Landing Beaches; Aslito/Isely Field; & Marpi Point, Saipan Island, designated in 1985.

== See also ==
- East Field (Saipan)
- Kobler Field
- Saipan International Airport
