= 133 Squadron =

133 Squadron may refer to:

- No. 133 Squadron RCAF, see list of Royal Canadian Air Force squadrons
- 133 Squadron (Israel)
- No. 133 Squadron RAF, United Kingdom
- 133d Aero Squadron, Air Service, United States Army; see list of American aero squadrons
- 133rd Air Refueling Squadron, United States Air Force
- VAQ-133, United States Navy
- VF-133, United States Navy
- VP-133, United States Navy
- VMA-133, United States Marine Corps
