= Landing Beaches; Aslito/Isely Field; & Marpi Point, Saipan Island =

- Landing Beaches, Aslito-Isely Field, and Marpi Point, Saipan Island
- U.S. National Register of Historic Places
- U.S. National Historic Landmark District
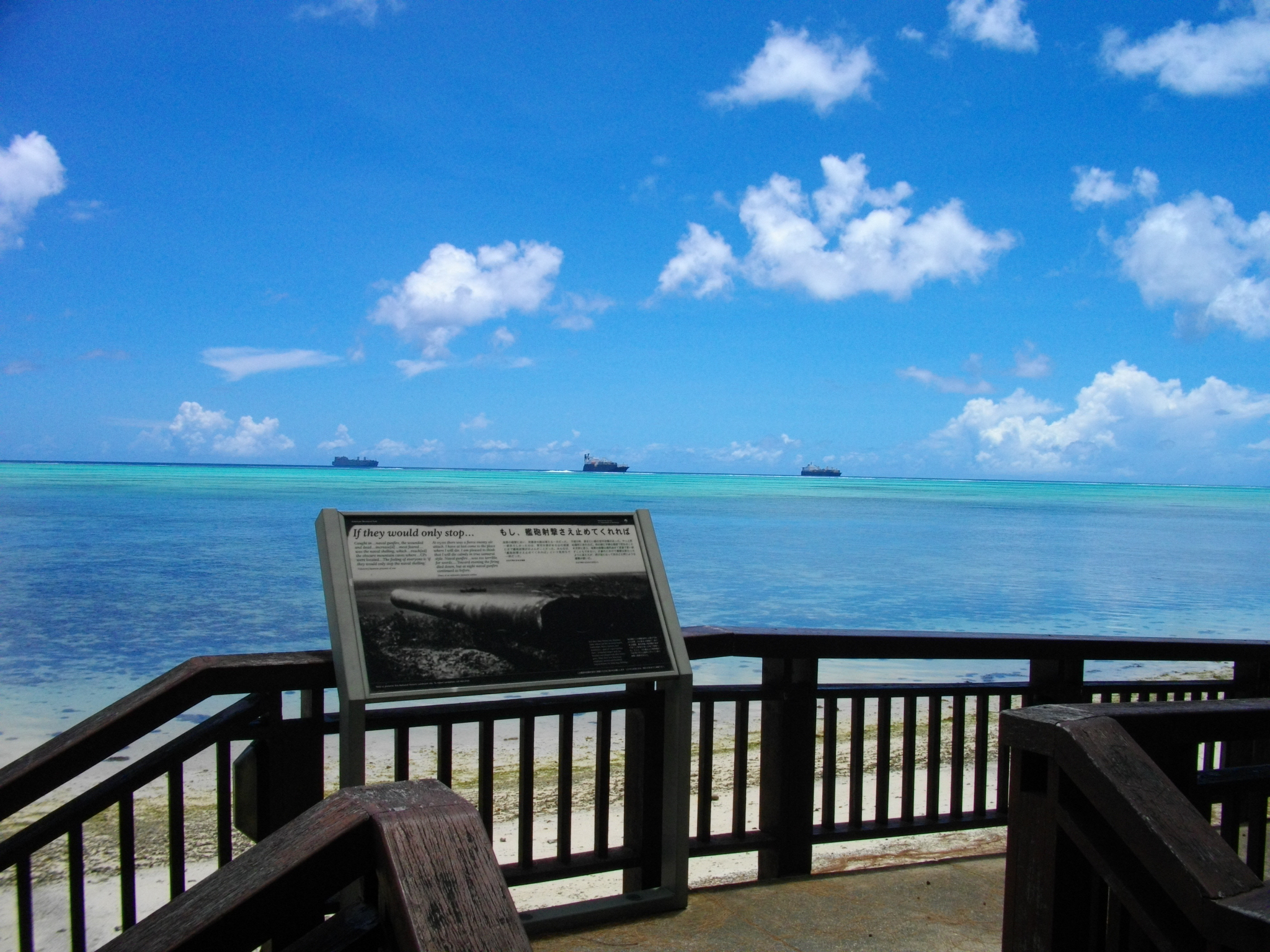
- View from one of the landing beaches
- Nearest city: Chalan Kanoa, Saipan
- Coordinates: 15°6′59″N 145°43′41″E
- Area: 1,366 acres (553 ha) (landing beaches; includes land and water) 1,453 acres (588 ha) (Aslito/Isely Field) 737 acres (298 ha) (Marpi Point area)
- Built: 1944
- NRHP reference No.: 85001789

Significant dates
- Added to NRHP: February 4, 1985
- Designated NHLD: February 4, 1985

Landing Beaches; Aslito/Isely Field & Marpi Point, Saipan Island is a National Historic Landmark District consists of several discontiguous areas of the island of Saipan in the Northern Mariana Islands. The sites were designated for their association with the Japanese defense of Saipan during World War II, the 1944 Battle of Saipan in which United States forces captured the island, and the subsequent campaigns which used Saipan as a base. The district includes the landing beaches where the U.S. forces landed, the remnants of Japanese airfields Aslito and Marpi Point and Isely Field, the airfield built over much of Aslito from which B-29 bombers were used to bomb the Japanese home islands. The Marpi Point area includes Suicide Cliff and Banzai Cliff, two locations where significant numbers of Japanese military and civilians jumped to their deaths rather than surrender to advancing U.S. forces. The loss of Saipan was a major blow to the Japanese war effort, leading to the resignation of Prime Minister Hideki Tojo, The landmark designation was made in 1985.

== Landing beaches ==
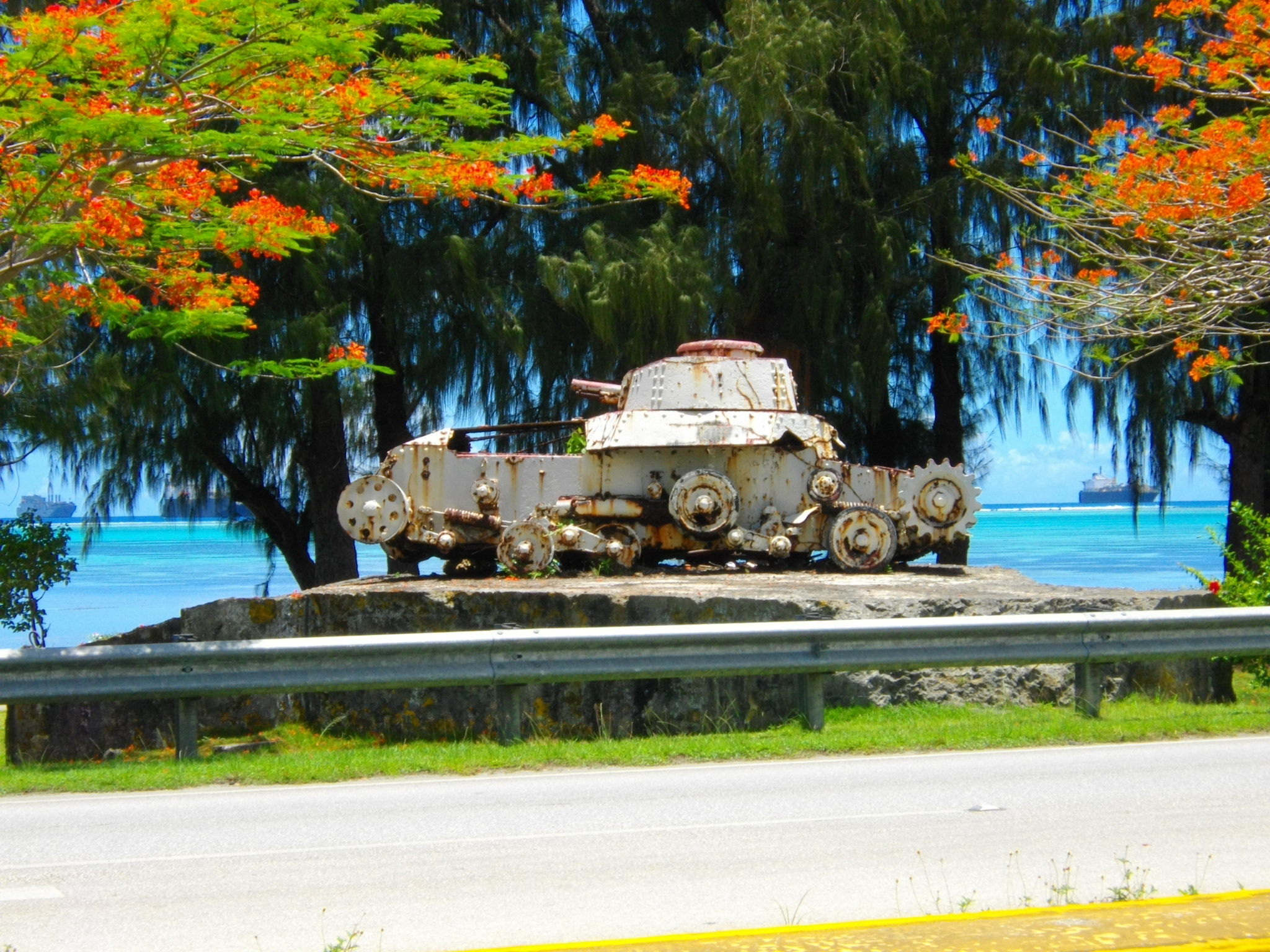
Landing beach bunker and Japanese tank

The main beaches where U.S. forces landed during the Battle of Saipan are on Island's west side, extending from a point south of Garapan southward around Agingan Point and onto Obyan Beach. The landmarked area includes the beaches and lagoons out to the fringing coral reef. This area includes a small number of remnant Japanese defenses, including several pillboxes, a partially-constructed gun emplacement, and a small Japanese tank that has been set on a pillbox as a sort of monument.

== Aslito/Isely Field ==
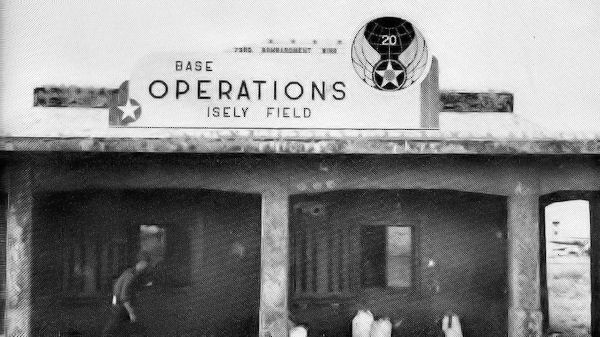
Base Operations Building, Isely Field, 1945

The Japanese built Aslito Airfield, now the site of Saipan International Airport, in 1934. It was captured early in the Battle of Saipan; a significant number of its concrete structures survived the battle and the later development of Isely Field and the present airport. Most of these structures are abandoned; the best-preserved is the former air operations building, which was rehabilitated and used as a tourist bureau.

The main elements of Isely Field to survive in the post-war period are its runways, one of which is now used by the modern airport. Elements of the aprons and taxiways used by the B-29s survive to some degree, but are overgrown. Included in this area is a portion of Obyan Beach where a Japanese pillbox is located.

== Marpi Point ==
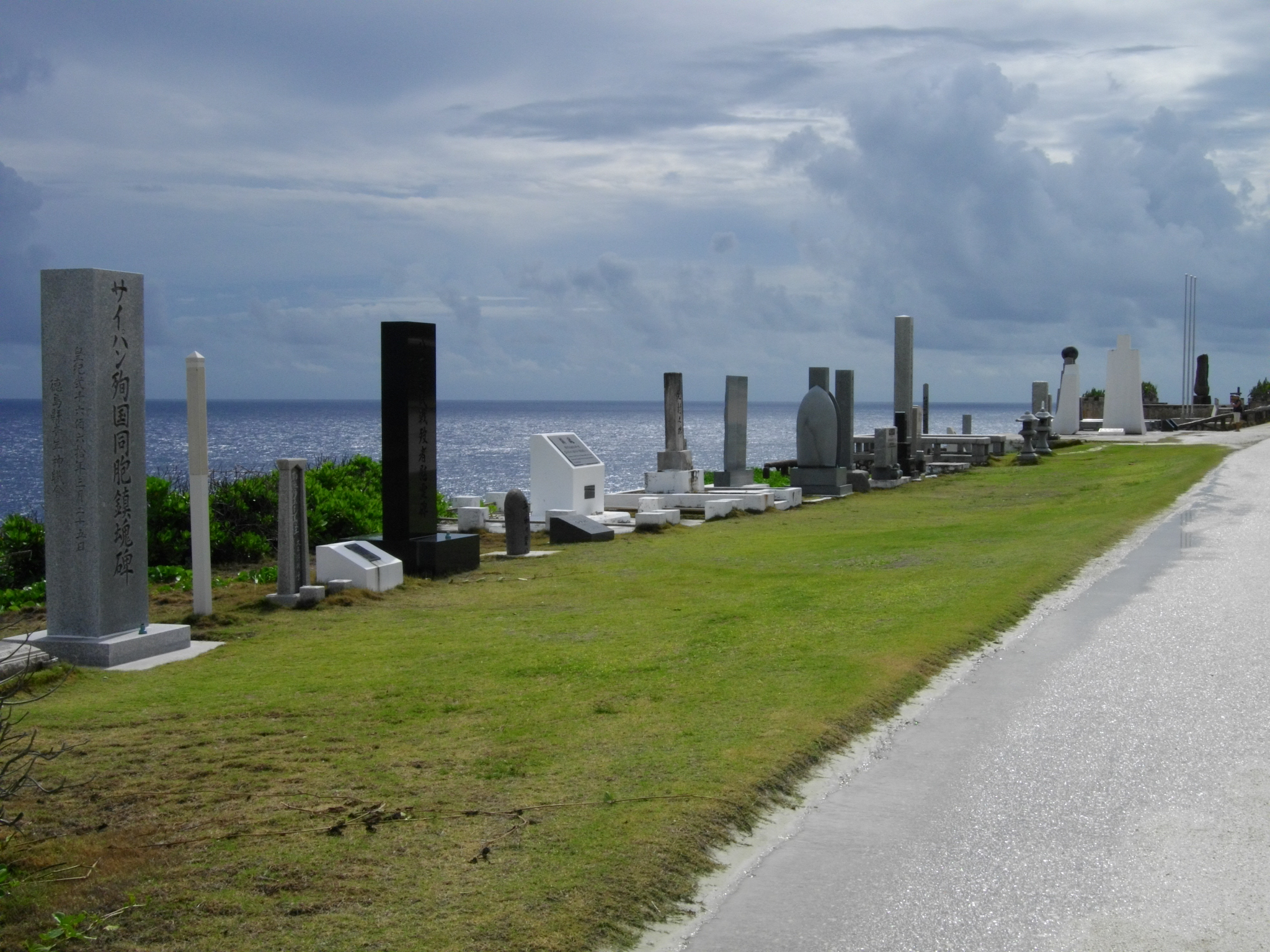
Banzai Cliff monuments

Marpi Point is the northernmost part of the island. At the north-facing Suicide Cliff, an unknown but large number of civilians and soldiers jumped to their deaths rather than surrendering to the advancing U.S. forces. The area is now marked by memorials at the top and base of the cliff. Nearby is a Japanese cave fortification known locally as the "last command post". Below this is a plain where the Japanese had built a small airfield, and the U.S. later built Marpi Point Field, of which only remnants survive. At the very northernmost point of the island is Banzai Cliff, where more people jumped to their deaths. There is also Unai Lagua Japanese Defense Pillbox whose position commands most of the island's north coast.

== See also ==
- List of United States National Historic Landmarks in United States commonwealths and territories, associated states, and foreign states
- National Register of Historic Places listings in the Northern Mariana Islands
- Naval Advance Base Saipan
