= 878th Bombardment Squadron =

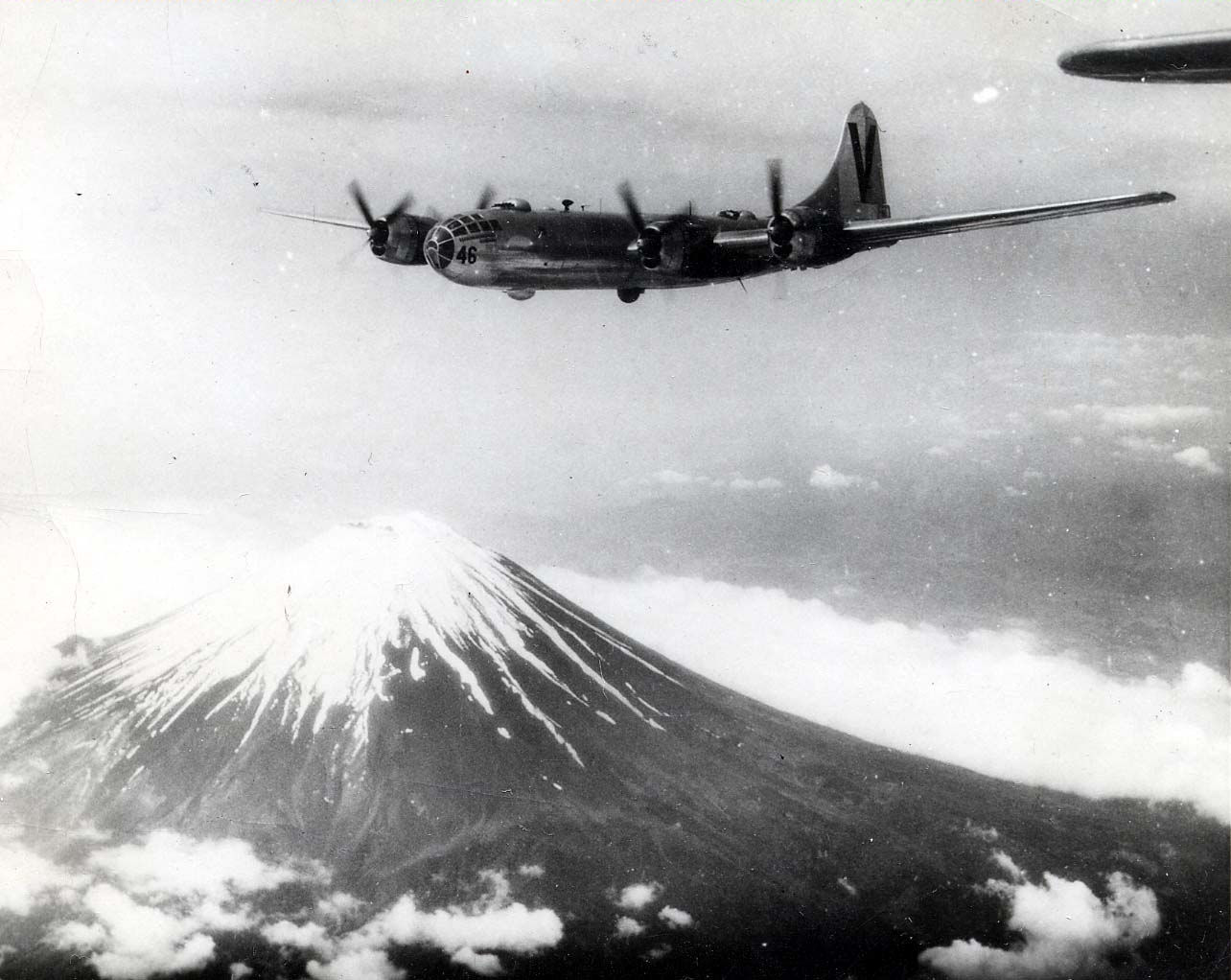
- 499th Group B-29 Superfortress over Mount Fuji in 1945
- Active: 1943-1946
- Country: United States
- Branch: United States Air Force
- Role: Heavy bomber
- Engagements: Pacific Ocean Theater of World War II
- Decorations: Distinguished Unit Citation

Insignia
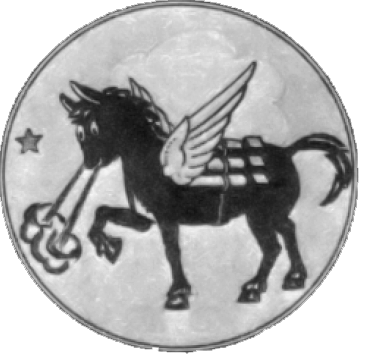
- 878th Bombardment Squadron emblem (Note: Approved 8 September 1945. Description: On a light turquoise blue disc, border white, edged black, a caricatured, red pack horse facing to dexter, winged white, snorting flames from the nostrils, and having three, brown aerial bombs strapped on back by a brown and yellow band, all in front of a large white cloud formation; in dexter fess a yellow-orange five-point star, edged black.)

The 878th Bombardment Squadron is a former United States Army Air Forces unit. It was activated in November 1943, equipped with Boeing B-29 Superfortress bombers, and assigned to the 499th Bombardment Group. After training in the United States, it deployed to Saipan, where it participated in the strategic bombing campaign against Japan, earning two Distinguished Unit Citations. After V-J Day, it returned to the United States, where it was inactivated at March Field, California on 16 February 1946.

== History ==
The squadron was activated at Davis-Monthan Field, Arizona in November 1943 as one of the original four squadrons of the 499th Bombardment Group. Ten days later, a cadre moved to Smoky Hill Army Air Field, Kansas to begin Boeing B-29 Superfortress very heavy bomber training. The 878th trained in Kansas with early model B-29s, with frequent delays in training due to modifications of the aircraft correcting production deficiencies. They moved to Arizona when training was completed. the squadron moved to its combat base, Isely Field, Saipan, in the Mariana Islands in July 1944.

The squadron did not arrive at its combat station until September 1944. The squadron's first missions were flown against targets on Iwo Jima and Truk Island. On 24 November 1944, the squadron participated in the first raid on Japan by bombers based in the Mariana Islands. The squadron initially engaged in high altitude daylight attacks against industrial targets in Japan, It was awarded a Distinguished Unit Citation (DUC) for an attack on the Mitsubishi engine manufacturing plant in Nagoya on 23 January 1945.

In March 1945, the tactics of Twentieth Air Force changed and the squadron began flying low level night attacks with incendiaries against area targets. The squadron was diverted from strategic operations when it conducted a series of raids on airfields in Kyushu to support Operation Iceberg, the landings on Okinawa in April 1945. The squadron earned a second DUC for this support. The squadron also dropped propaganda leaflets in enemy territory. After V-J Day, the squadron dropped food and supplies to Allied prisoners of war. It remained on Saipan until November and reassembled at March Field, California, where it was inactivated in February 1946.

== Lineage ==
- Constituted as the 878th Bombardment Squadron, Very Heavy on 19 November 1943

Activated on 20 November 1943
Inactivated on 16 February 1946

=== Assignments ===
- 499th Bombardment Group, 20 November 1943 – 16 February 1946

=== Stations ===
- Davis-Monthan Field, Arizona, 20 November 1943
- Smoky Hill Army Air Field, Kansas, 1 December 1943
- Clovis Army Air Field, New Mexico, 11 February 1944
- Smoky Hill Army Air Field, Kansas, 8 April–22 July 1944
- Isely Field, Saipan, Mariana Islands 22 September 1944 –c. November 1945
- March Field, California, c. November 1945 – 16 February 1946

=== Aircraft ===
- Boeing B-17 Flying Fortress, 1944
- Boeing B-29 Superfortress, 1944–1946

=== Awards and campaigns ===
Award streamer	Award	Dates	Notes
	Distinguished Unit Citation	23 January 1945	Nagoya, Japan, 878th Bombardment Squadron
	Distinguished Unit Citation	22–28 April 1945	Japan, 878th Bombardment Squadron

Campaign Streamer	Campaign	Dates	Notes
	Air Offensive, Japan	22 September 1944–2 September 1945	878th Bombardment Squadron
	Western Pacific	17 April 1945–2 September 1945	878th Bombardment Squadron

== See also ==
- B-17 Flying Fortress units of the United States Army Air Forces
- List of B-29 Superfortress operators
