= Kobler Field =

World War II airfield in the Mariana Islands

- Part of Seventh Air Force
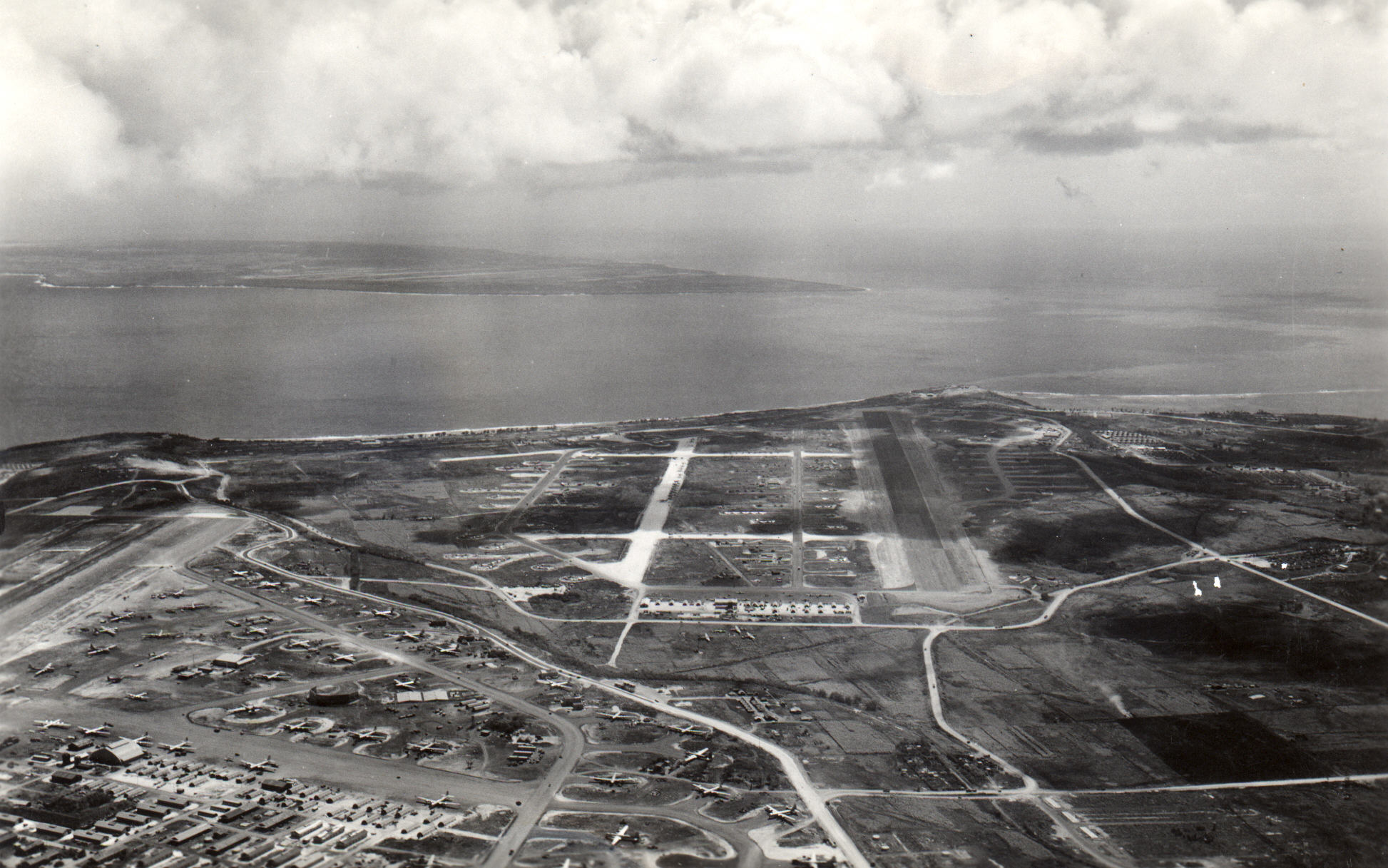
- Aerial view of Kobler Field, Saipan, Mariana Islands

Site information
- Type: Military airfield
- Controlled by: United States Army Air Forces
- Condition: abandoned

Location
- Coordinates: 15°07′26″N 145°42′25″E

Site history
- Built: 1944
- Built by: Aviation Engineers
- In use: 1944–1977
- Materials: coral

Kobler Field is a former a World War II airfield on Saipan in the Mariana Islands, part of Naval Advance Base Saipan. It was closed in 1977 and redeveloped as a residential housing area.

== History ==
=== World War II ===
Kobler Field was constructed between August and October 1944 near Aslito on the southern end of Saipan as a base for Twentieth Air Force B-29 Superfortresses carrying out the strategic bombing campaign against the Japanese Home Islands. The facility had a 200 by 8,500 feet (61 m × 2,591 m) runway, repair and maintenance facilities, and hardstanding for 120 aircraft. The airfield was named after Lt. Wayne F. Kobler, a 19th Fighter Squadron pilot who was killed on 27 June 1944 while flying his P-47 on a low-level attack mission on Tinian.

As Isely Field, North Field, and West Field on Tinian became operational, Kobler Field was increasingly used by the Twentieth Air Force as an auxiliary field for storage and basing of miscellaneous aircraft.

A LORAN navigation station was established at the end of Kobler Field in November 1944, which the United States Coast Guard continued to operate until January 1978.

The 819th Bombardment Squadron flying B-24 Liberators deployed to Kobler Field in August 1944 to undertake attacks on Japanese islands and shipping.

On 22 June 1945, following a raid on Kure Naval Arsenal, a B-29 crashed at Kobler Field while attempting to land on two engines.

=== Postwar ===
In the postwar era, Kobler Field was transferred to US Navy administration and remained under US Navy control until placed out of service in the early 1960s. VF-13A flying F4U-4s operated from Kobler Field from 1946 into 1947. VA-12 was shore-based at NAB Kobler Field from 21 August–19 September and November–December 1946.VA-1A was shore-based at NAB Kobler Field from 28 December 1946 until 9 January 1947. Carrier Aircraft Service Unit (CASU) 47 was also based at NAB Kobler Field.

On 16 May 1968, Continental Micronesia's first commercial flight, a Boeing 727-100 jet known as Ju Ju, took off from Kobler Field to Honolulu International Airport. Kobler Field operated as the main airfield on Saipan until 25 July 1976, when operations were moved to Saipan International Airport.

== Current status ==
Following its closure, Kobler Field was redeveloped as Koblerville, a residential housing area. One runway is now Beach Road/Koblerville Road. Saipan Southern High School and Koblerville Elementary School are located in the path of the second runway.

== See also ==
- East Field (Saipan)
- Marpi Point Field
- Saipan International Airport
- USAAF in the Central Pacific
