= VMO-2 =

Former observation squadron of the US Marine Corps

Marine Observation Squadron 2
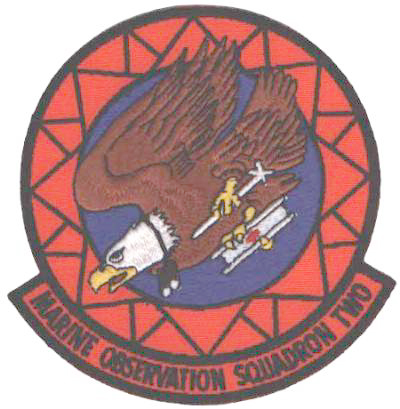
- VMO-2 insignia
- Active: 1 Nov 1943 – 26 Aug 1946 15 Jun 1951 – 23 Mar 1971 30 Sep 1971 – 20 May 1993
- Country: United States
- Branch: USMC
- Type: Observation
- Role: Artillery spotting Aerial reconnaissance
- Part of: N/A
- Garrison/HQ: Inactive
- Nicknames: Cherry Deuce; The Angry Two
- Tail Codes: VS (1st); UU (2nd)
- Engagements: World War II: Battle of Saipan; Battle of Tinian; Battle of Okinawa; Vietnam War Operation Desert Storm

Aircraft flown
- Multirole helicopter: OH-43D Huskie; UH-1E Huey; AH-1G Cobra
- Reconnaissance: F4F Wildcat; OY-1 Grasshopper; OV-10 Bronco

Marine Observation Squadron 2 (VMO-2) was an observation squadron of the United States Marine Corps which saw extensive action during World War II and the Vietnam War. They were based at Marine Corps Air Station Futenma, Japan and Marine Corps Air Station Camp Pendleton, California and saw their final combat in support of Operation Desert Storm in 1991. The squadron was decommissioned on 23 May 1993.

== Mission ==
Provide aerial fire support spotting and intelligence in support of the Marine Air-Ground Task Force.

== History ==
=== World War II and the 1950s ===
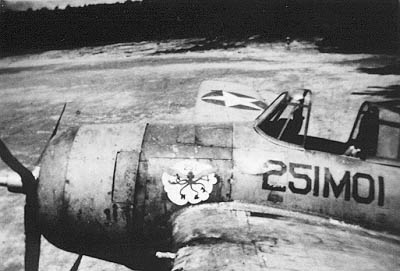
A rare F4F-3P of VMO-251 at Espiritu Santo in 1942.

Artillery Spotting Division, Marine Observation Squadron 251 (VMO-251) was commissioned at Marine Corps Base Quantico, Virginia, on 1 November 1943. In February 1944, VMO-251 was re-designated VMO-2 and attached to the 2nd Marine Division in Hawaii flying hundreds of missions in the OY-1 aircraft. The squadron participated in the Battle of Saipan where they were the first American airplanes to land at Marpi Point Field. During the Battle of Tinian the squadron reconnoitered the island and registered the various batteries positions. The Battle of Okinawa would see their last combat of the war. During the battle, aircraft from the squadron would again be the first American planes to land on the island and they would continue in their primary role of reconnaissance and artillery-spotting missions. Following the surrender of Japan, the squadron remained in Japan until June 1946 when it sailed for the United States. Arriving at Marine Corps Air Station Cherry Point, North Carolina, VMO-2 was reassigned to Marine Aircraft Group 22 (MAG-22), 2nd Marine Aircraft Wing. Here the squadron was decommissioned on 26 August 1946.

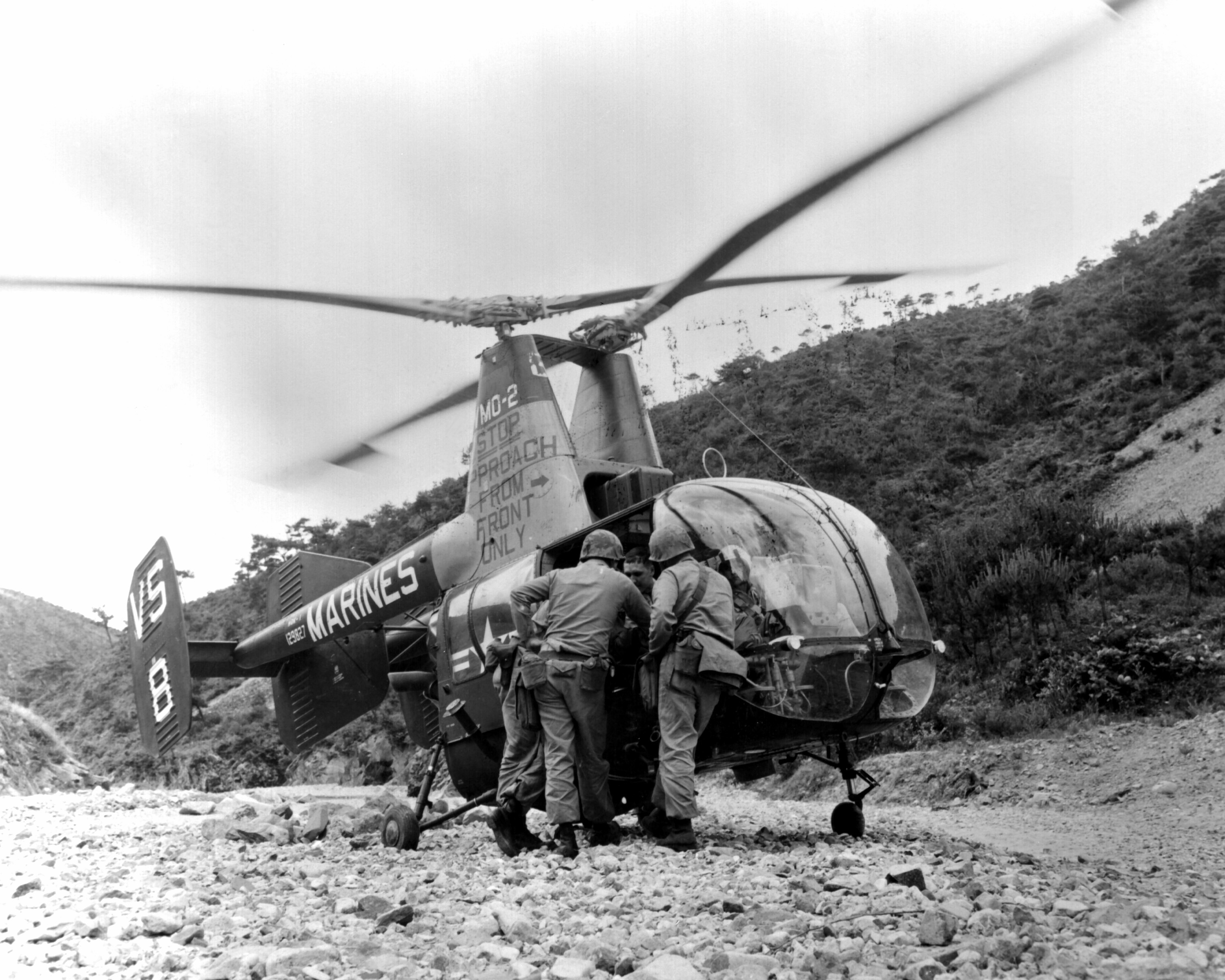
An OH-43D Huskie of VMO-2 in Korea, June 1962.

VMO-2 was re-commissioned on 15 June 1951 at Marine Corps Air Station Santa Ana, California with a new updated mission set centered on reconnaissance and artillery and naval gunfire spotting. In 1953, the squadron moved to Japan with fixed and rotary wing aircraft, and remained there until April 1956 when all but a subunit was relocated to Okinawa.

=== Vietnam War ===
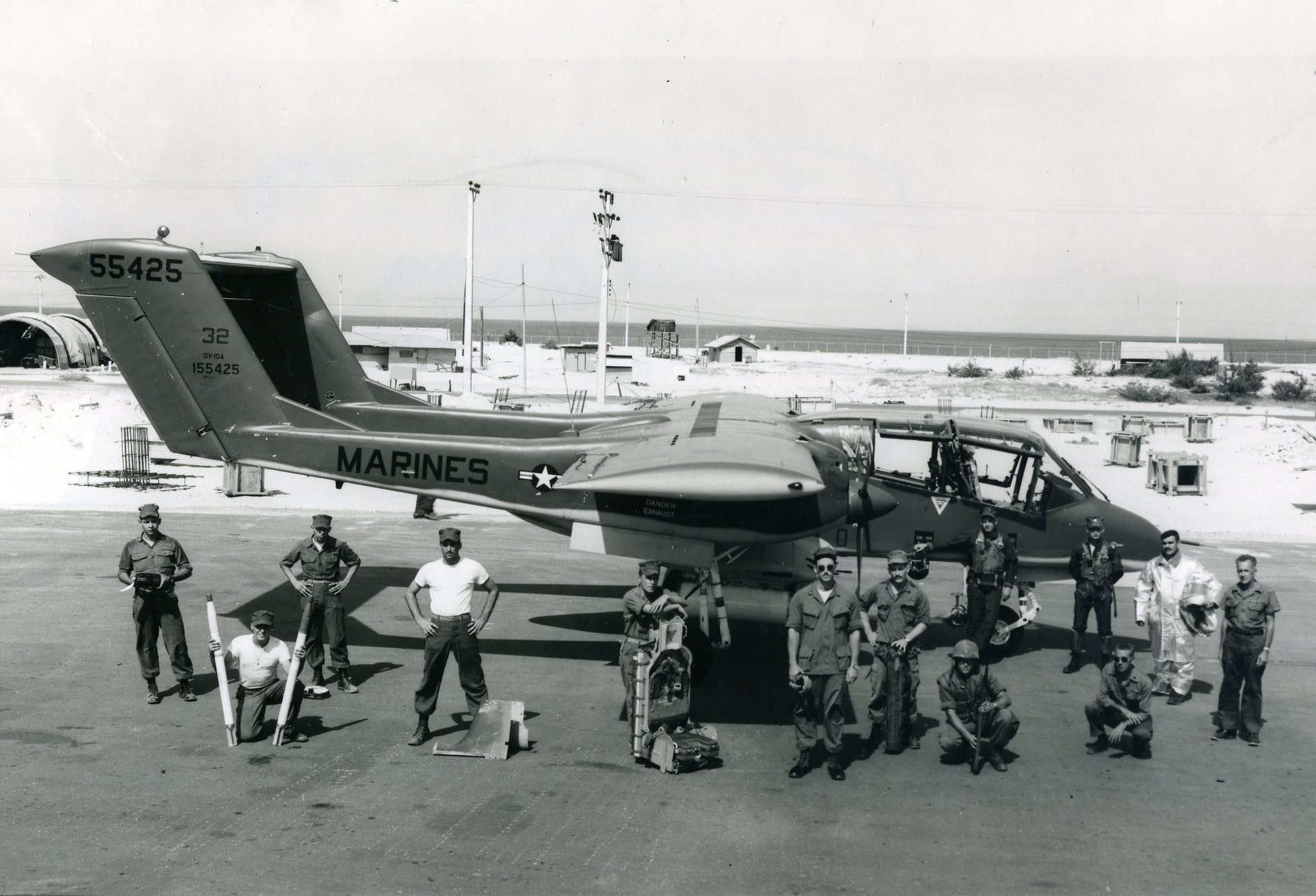
OV-10A of VMO-2 with Marines at Marble Mountain Air Facility, 1968

Beginning in 1965 VMO-2 was part of Marine Aircraft Group 16 (MAG-16) at Marble Mountain Air Facility, Da Nang in South Vietnam flying the UH-1E Iroquois. On 6 July 1968 the first OV-10 Broncos belonging to VMO-2 arrived at Danang. The small, maneuverable, lightly armed reconnaissance aircraft was tailor-made to support counter-insurgency operations. Beginning in 1969 the squadron began to fly the AH-1G Cobra. The squadron split on 17 December 1969, becoming an OV-10 only unit with all AH-1s transferred to HML-367. On 2 February 1970 VMO-2 transferred to Marine Aircraft Group 11 (MAG-11) at Da Nang Air Base. The squadron flew its last combat mission on 22 March 1971. The Bronco flew over 38,000 combat flight hours between 8 September 1968 and 23 March 1971. On 24–25 March 1971, the remaining 14 Broncos were flown to Naval Air Station Cubi Point, Philippines for follow on travel to the United States. The squadron was in cadre status until 30 September 1971 when it was re-commissioned at MCALF Camp Pendleton, California. They received the nine OV-10s that had been assigned to HMLA-267.

== Operation Desert Storm ==
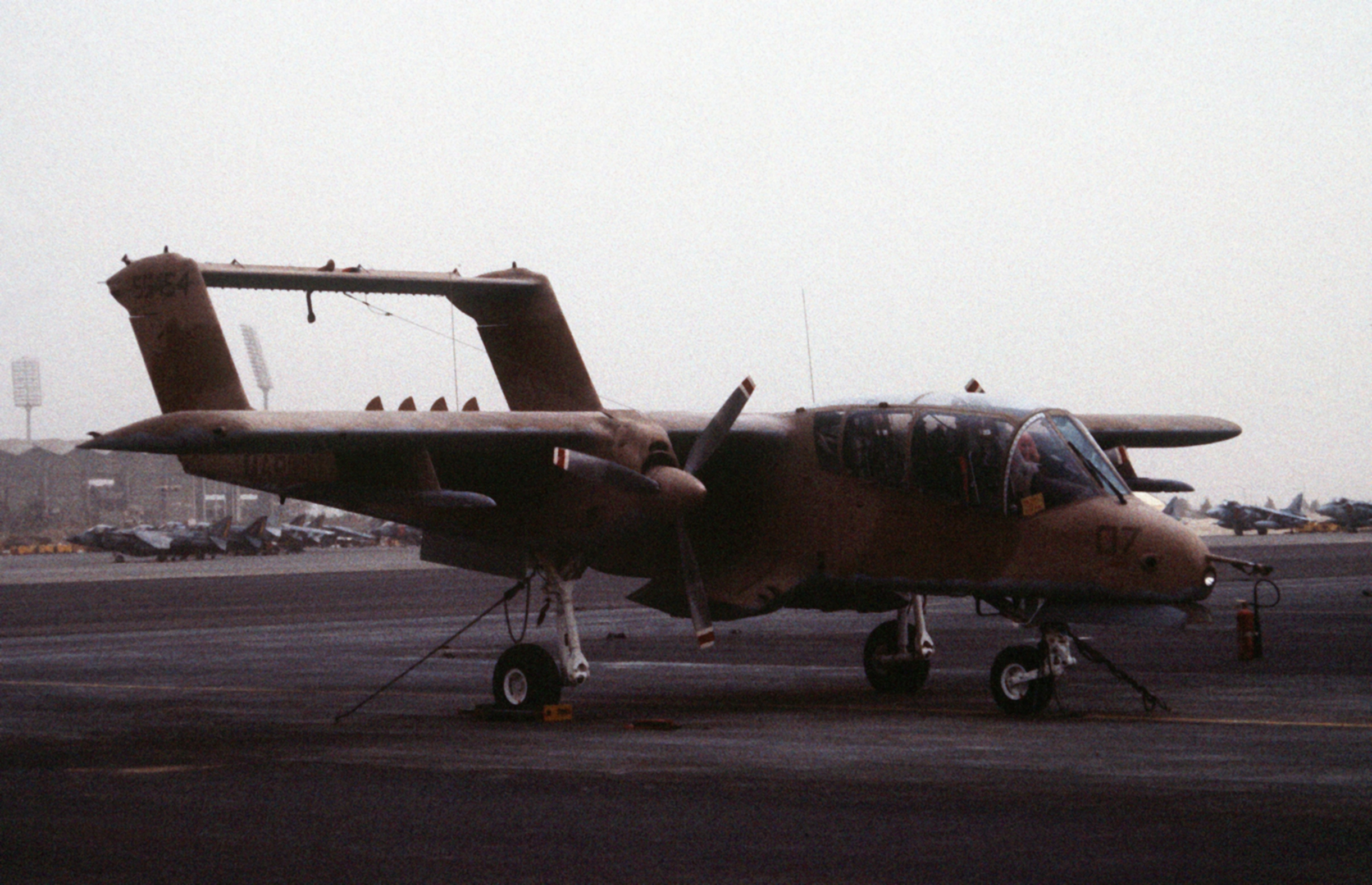
A VMO-2 OV-10A at Mecca in December 1990.

In August 1990, VMO-2 made aviation news by launching six OV-10's on an unprecedented 16,000 km (10,000 mi) journey to Saudi Arabia in support of Operation Desert Shield. Beginning in January 1991 the squadron flew a total of 286 combat missions totaling 900 flight hours during Operation Desert Storm. Missions were flown around the clock for the duration of the conflict, focusing primarily on controlling U.S. and Allied artillery, numerous attack aircraft, and naval gunfire, including spotting for the USS Wisconsin's first combat firing since the Korean War. The squadron performed these demanding and crucial missions despite being targeted by Iraqi surface-to-air missile gunners over 94 times and while trying to avoid large concentrations of antiaircraft artillery. These efforts resulted in confirmed kills totaling 54 tanks, 53 armored personnel carriers, 49 artillery pieces, 112 other vehicles, and four command post buildings.

== Popular culture ==
In the U.S. television series Magnum, P.I. (1980–1988) the main characters Rick Wright played by Larry Manetti, and T.C. played by Roger E. Mosley had previously been members of VMO-2 in Vietnam. Tom Selleck and Roger E. Mosley wore "VMO-2 DaNang" baseball caps in the series. In early episodes a Bell Jet Ranger in VMO-2 markings is shown.

In the 2018 reboot of Magnum P.I. Episode 2, Carl Weathers is wearing a VMO-2 DaNang baseball cap.

== Unit awards ==
A unit citation or commendation is an award bestowed upon an organization for the action cited. Members of the unit who participated in said actions are allowed to wear on their uniforms the awarded unit citation. VMO-2 has been presented with the following awards:

Presidential Unit Citation
Navy Unit Commendation (with four bronze stars)
Meritorious Unit Commendation
Asiatic-Pacific Campaign Medal
World War II Victory Medal
Navy Occupation Service Medal with Asia clasp
National Defense Service Medal (with two bronze stars)
Korean Service Medal
Armed Forces Expeditionary Medal
Vietnam Service Medal with two silver stars and three bronze stars
Southwest Asia Service Medal (with two bronze stars)
Vietnam Cross of Gallantry with Palm Streamer
Vietnam Meritorious Unit Citation Civil Action Medal

== See also ==
- United States Marine Corps Aviation
- List of active United States Marine Corps aircraft squadrons
- List of decommissioned United States Marine Corps aircraft squadrons
