= Suicide Cliff =

Cliff on Saipan, Northern Mariana Islands

- U.S. National Register of Historic Places
- U.S. National Historic Landmark District – Contributing property
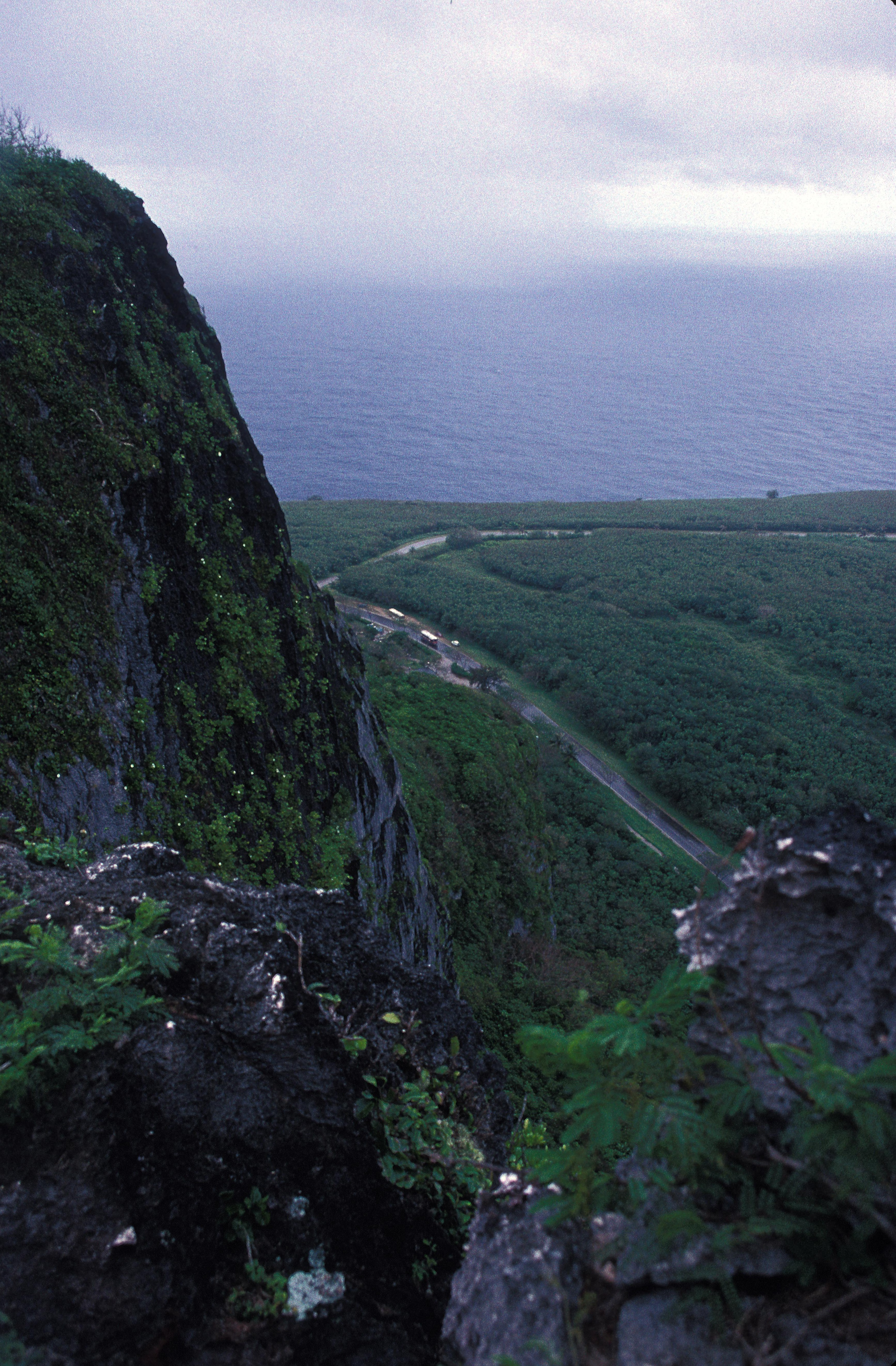
- Nearest city: San Roque (Saipan), N. Mariana Islands
- Coordinates: 15°16′38″N 145°48′35″E
- Area: 9 acres (3.6 ha)
- Part of: Landing Beaches; Aslito/Isley Field; & Marpi Point, Saipan Island (ID85001789)
- NRHP reference No.: 76002193

Significant dates
- Added to NRHP: September 30, 1976
- Designated NHLDCP: February 4, 1985

Suicide Cliff is a cliff above Marpi Point Field near the northern tip of Saipan, Northern Mariana Islands, which achieved historic significance late in World War II.

Also known as Laderan Banadero, it is a location where Japanese civilians and Imperial Japanese Army soldiers took their own lives by jumping to their deaths in July 1944 in order to avoid capture by the United States. Japanese propaganda had emphasized brutal American treatment of Japanese, citing the American mutilation of Japanese war dead and claiming U.S. Army Soldiers were bloodthirsty and without morals. Many Japanese feared the "American devils raping and devouring Japanese women and children." The precise number of suicides there is not known. One eyewitness said he saw "hundreds of bodies" below the cliff, while elsewhere, numbers in the thousands have been cited.

By 1976, a park and peace memorial was in place and the location had become a pilgrimage destination, particularly for visitors from Japan. In that year, nine acres (3.6 ha) of the site were listed on the US National Register of Historic Places.

The cliff is, along with the airfield and Banzai Cliff, a coastal cliff where suicides also took place, part of the National Historic Landmark District Landing Beaches; Aslito/Isley Field; & Marpi Point, Saipan Island, designated in 1985.

== See also ==
- National Register of Historic Places listings in the Northern Mariana Islands
- Banzai Cliff
