= 499th Air Refueling Wing =

Inactive US Air Force unit

499th Air Refueling Wing (later 499th Air Expeditionary Group)

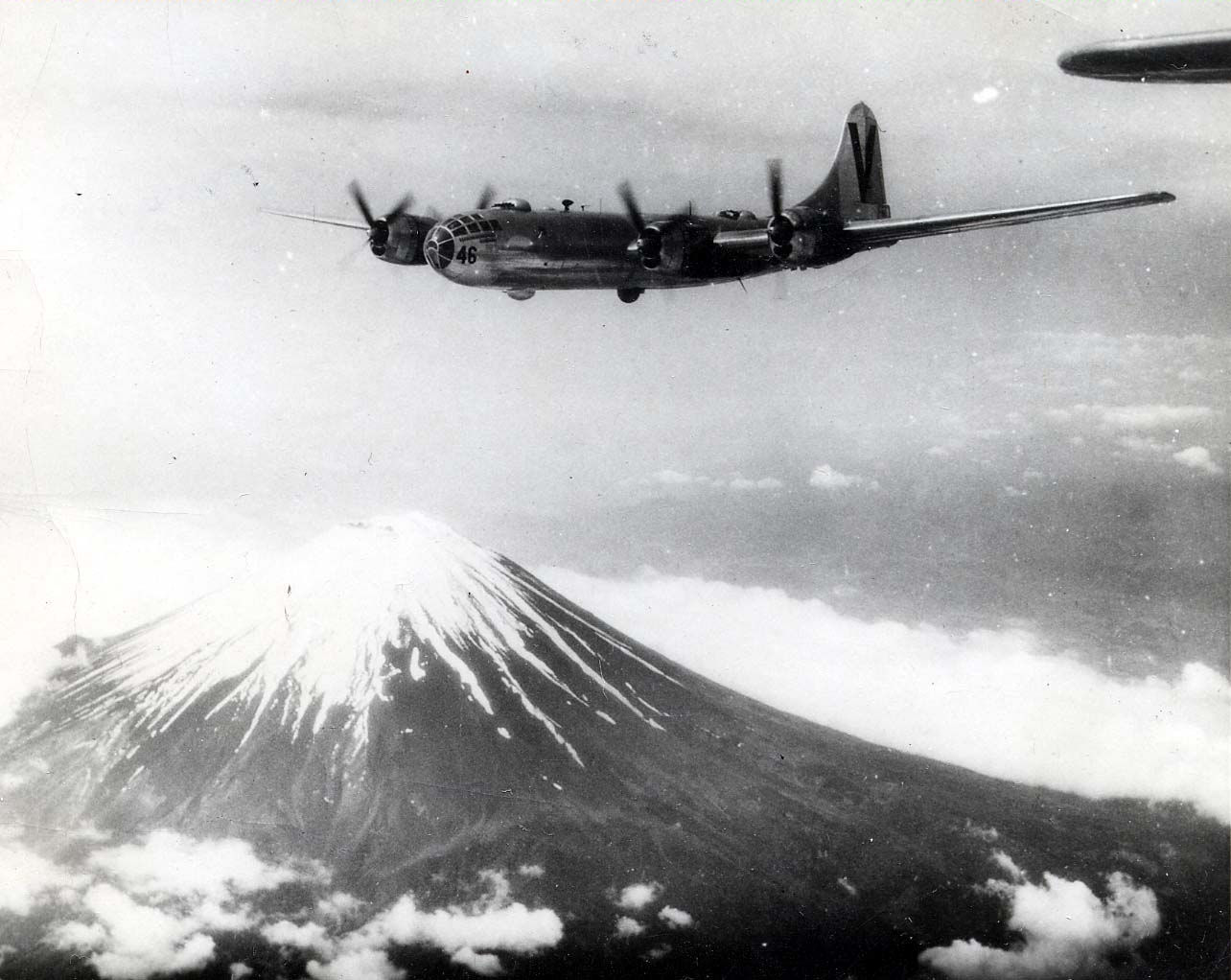
- Group B-29 Superfortress over Mount Fuji in 1945
- Active: 1943–1946; 1963–1966
- Country: United States
- Branch: United States Air Force
- Role: Bombardment, aerial refueling
- Motto: Auxilium ab Alto (Latin for 'Help from Above')
- Engagements: Pacific Theater of Operations
- Decorations: Distinguished Unit Citation

Insignia
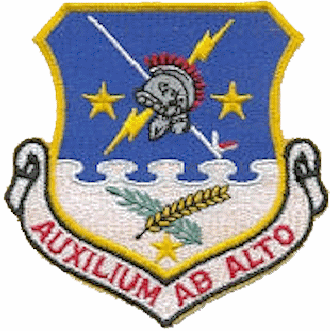
- 499th Air Refueling Wing emblem (Note: Approved for the 4050th Air Refueling Wing.)
- Group tail identification (World War II): Square V

The 499th Air Refueling Wing is an inactive United States Air Force unit that was last active at Westover Air Force Base, Massachusetts in June 1966.

The wing was first activated as the 499th Bombardment Group of the United States Army Air Forces, which flew combat in the Pacific Theater of Operations as part of Twentieth Air Force during World War II. The 499th BG engaged in very heavy Boeing B-29 Superfortress bombardment operations against Japan for which it earned two Distinguished Unit Citations. Its aircraft were identified by a "V" and a square painted on the tail.

The 499th Air Refueling Wing was an air refueling and airborne command and control unit active from 1963 to 1966. In 1984 USAF consolidated the group and wing into a single unit sharing a common history.

== History ==
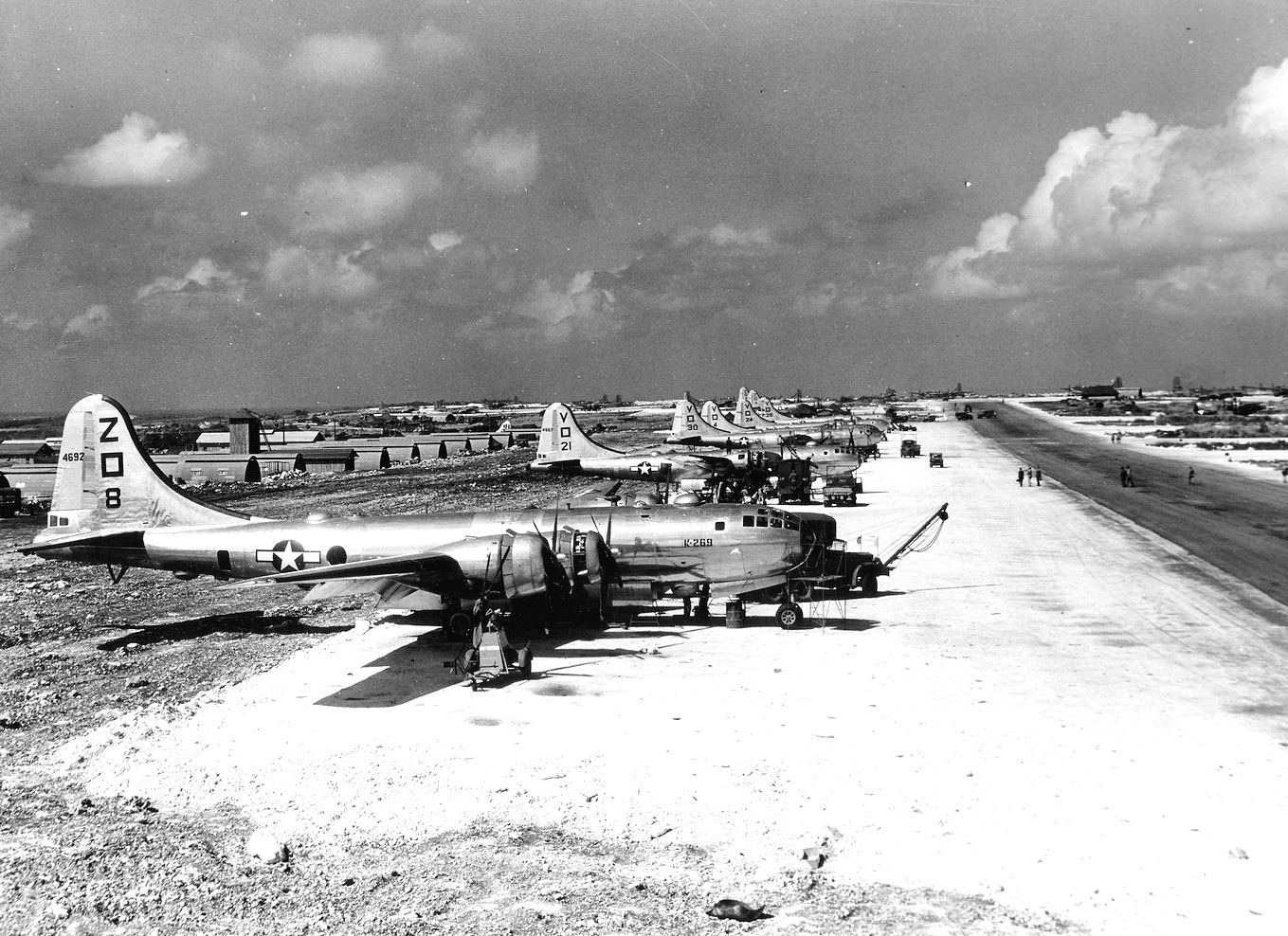
499th Bomb Group B-29s on Isely Field Saipan, 1949

=== World War II ===
The 499th Bombardment Group was established in late 1943 at Davis–Monthan Field, Arizona as a Boeing B-29 Superfortress very heavy bombardment group. The unit's original operational squadrons were the 877th, 878th, 879th, and 880th Bombardment Squadrons. It was also assigned four bombardment maintenance squadrons (one paired with each of its operational squadrons) and a photographic laboratory,

The group moved to Smoky Hill Army Air Field, Kansas in December 1943 to begin training. Due to a shortage of B-29 Superfortresses, the group was equipped with Boeing B-17 Flying Fortresses already at Smoky Hill that had been previously used for training heavy bomber replacements. In the spring of 1944, the 499th finally received newly manufactured B-29s. In May the United States Army Air Forces reorganized its very heavy bombardment units. The 880th Bombardment Squadron and the bombardment maintenance squadrons were inactivated and their personnel absorbed into the remaining three squadrons.

The 499th deployed in September 1944, and became part of the XXI Bomber Command in the Northern Mariana Islands at Isely Field, Saipan, in the Central Pacific Area. Upon arrival the group's personnel were engaged in Quonset hut construction. By mid-October most personnel were able to move into the huts from the initial tents which they were assigned on arrival. The group began operations with attacks in the Truk Islands and on Iwo Jima. It took part in the first attack on Japan by AAF planes based in the Marianas. The group flew numerous missions in daylight, operating from high altitude to bomb strategic targets in Japan.

The 499th received a Distinguished Unit Citation (DUC) for striking the Mitsubishi aircraft engine plant at Nagoya on 23 January 1945. In March 1945 the group began to conduct night attacks, flying at low altitude to drop incendiaries on area targets in Japan. It completed a series of attacks against enemy airfields on Kyūshū to aid the Invasion of Okinawa in April 1945 and received another DUC for this action. The group released propaganda leaflets over the Japanese home islands, in July and August, continuing strategic bombing raids and incendiary attacks until the Japanese surrender in August 1945.

After V-J Day, the 499th dropped supplies to Allied prisoners. In November 1945 the unit returned to the United States; where it was assigned to Continental Air Forces's Fourth Air Force at March Field, California. However demobilization was in full swing and the group was inactivated on 17 January 1946.

=== Cold War ===
The origins of the 499th Air Refueling Wing date to 1 April 1955, when Strategic Air Command (SAC) organized the 4050th Air Refueling Wing at Westover Air Force Base, Massachusetts and assigned it to Eighth Air Force and later the 57th Air Division. The 4050th became the host organization when Westover transferred to SAC from Military Air Transport Service. In addition to the 384th Air Refueling Squadron, flying Boeing KC-97 Stratofreighters, the wing was assigned three maintenance squadrons and an air base group. Three weeks later the wing added a second KC-97 squadron, the 26th Air Refueling Squadron, which moved to Westover from Lockbourne Air Force Base, Ohio. A little over a year later, the wing became a tenant of the 99th Bombardment Wing and the personnel, equipment, and mission of its 4050th Air Base Group were transferred on 4 September 1956 to 57th Air Division's 814th Air Base Group (Later redesignated as the 814th Combat Support Group), and then finally transferred to the newly activated 99th Combat Support Group on 2 January 1968.

On 1 July 1957, the wing was assigned the newly activated 99th Air Refueling Squadron, located at Turner Air Force Base, Georgia. In August, the 99th moved to Westover and replaced the 26th Air Refueling Squadron, which moved to Plattsburgh Air Force Base, New York and was reassigned from the wing. Unlike the wing's other squadrons, the 99th was a Boeing KC-135 Stratotanker Squadron whose mission was to support the Boeing B-52 Stratofortresses of the co-located 99th Bombardment Wing.

In 1960, the wing added the mission of commanding SAC air refueling squadrons that were forward positioned in the middle Atlantic states at bases hosted by other Major Commands. In January the 305th Air Refueling Squadron was reassigned to the wing when it moved from MacDill Air Force Base, Florida to McGuire Air Force Base, New Jersey. and in June the 11th Air Refueling Squadron at Dover Air Force Base, Delaware was reassigned to the wing. In April the 19th Air Refueling Squadron at Otis Air Force Base, Massachusetts was assigned to the wing after the 4060th Air Refueling Wing at Dow Air Force Base, Maine was discontinued. With five air refueling squadrons assigned, the 4050th (and later the 499th) became the largest operational wing in SAC.

The following April, the wing added a squadron in the mid Atlantic, the 303d Air Refueling Squadron at Kindley Air Force Base, Bermuda. The 19th was transferred to the 4038th Strategic Wing the same day in preparation for conversion to KC-135s to support the 4038th's B-52s.

However, SAC Major Command Controlled (MAJCON) units could not carry a permanent history or lineage. and SAC looked for a way to make its these wings permanent. In 1962, in order to perpetuate the lineage of many currently inactive bombardment units with illustrious World War II records, SAC received authority from USAF to discontinue its MAJCON wings that were equipped with combat aircraft and to activate Air Force Controlled (AFCON) units, most of which were inactive at the time which could carry a lineage and history.

As a result, the 4050th was replaced by the newly constituted 499th Air Refueling Wing which assumed its mission, personnel, and equipment on 1 January 1963. (Note: Although the 499th Wing was a new organization, it continued, through temporary bestowal, the history, and honors of the World War II 499th Bombardment Group. It was also entitled to retain the honors (but not the history or lineage) of the 4050th. The temporary bestowal of the 499th Group's honors ended in January 1984, when the 499th Wing and Group were consolidated into a single unit.) The 4050th's air refueling squadrons were reassigned to the 499th. Component support units were replaced by units with numerical designation of the newly established wing.

The 499th Air Refueling Wing continued to support SAC bombardment and Tactical Air Command aircraft with air refueling. The wing also deployed parts of its tanker force overseas to support unit movements and special operations. In addition to its tankers the 499th also flew the Boeing EC-135 Looking Glass missions in support of the Post Attack Command and Control System airborne command post for Eighth Air Force.

As SAC phased out its KC-97 aircraft, the wing began to shrink. The 303d Air Refueling Squadron inactivated in late spring 1963 and in July 1964 the three squadrons located at other bases were transferred to other SAC headquarters. In December 1965 the last KC-97 squadron assigned to the wing became non-operational, although it remained with the wing on paper. The 499th's KC-135 squadron was reassigned to the 99th Bombardment Wing the following month. The 499th Air Refueling Wing was inactivated on 25 June 1966.

== Lineage ==
499th Bombardment Group

- Constituted as 499th Bombardment Group, Very Heavy on 19 November 1943

Activated on 20 November 1943
Inactivated on 16 February 1946

- Consolidated on 31 January 1984 with 499th Air Refueling Wing as 499th Air Refueling Wing on 31 January 1984. (remained inactive)

499th Air Refueling Wing

- Constituted as 499th Air Refueling Wing on 15 November 1962 and activated (not organized)

Organized on 1 January 1963
Discontinued and inactivated on 25 June 1966

- Consolidated on 31 January 1984 with 499th Bombardment Group (remained inactive)
- Redesignated 499th Air Expeditionary Group and converted to provisional status on 12 June 2002

=== Assignments ===
- 73d Bombardment Wing, 20 November 1943 – 16 February 1946 (attached to 17th Bombardment Operational Training Wing 15 April 1944 – 22 July 1944)
- Strategic Air Command, 15 November 1962 (not organized)
- 57th Air Division, 1 January 1963 – 25 June 1966
- Air Mobility Command to activate or inactivate as needed

=== Components ===
Operational Squadrons

- 11th Air Refueling Squadron, 1 January 1963 – 1 July 1964

Dover Air Force Base, Delaware

- 19th Air Refueling Squadron, 15 June 1963 – 1 July 1964

Otis Air Force Base, Massachusetts

- 99th Air Refueling Squadron, 1 January 1963 – 1 January 1966
- 303d Air Refueling Squadron, 1 January 1963 – 15 June 1963

Kindley Air Force Base, Bermuda

- 305th Air Refueling Squadron, 1 January 1963 – 1 July 1964

McGuire Air Force Base, New Jersey

- 384th Air Refueling Squadron, 1 January 1963 – 25 June 1966 (not operational after 21 December 1965)
- 877th Bombardment Squadron, 20 November 1943 – 16 February 1946
- 878th Bombardment Squadron, 20 November 1943 – 16 February 1946
- 879th Bombardment Squadron, 20 November 1943 – 16 February 1946
- 880th Bombardment Squadron, 20 November 1943 – 10 May 1944

Maintenance Squadrons

- 25th Bombardment Maintenance Squadron, 20 November 1943 – 10 May 1944
- 26th Bombardment Maintenance Squadron, 20 November 1943 – 10 May 1944
- 27th Bombardment Maintenance Squadron, 20 November 1943 – 10 May 1944
- 28th Bombardment Maintenance Squadron, 20 November 1943 – 10 May 1944
- 499th Armament and Electronics Maintenance Squadron, 1 January 1963 – 25 June 1966
- 499th Field Maintenance Squadron, 1 January 1963 – 25 June 1966
- 499th Organizational Maintenance Squadron, 1 January 1963 – 25 June 1966

Other

- 17th Photographic Laboratory (Bombardment, Very Heavy), 20 November 1943 – 16 February 1946

=== Stations ===
- Davis–Monthan Field, Arizona, 20 November 1943
- Smoky Hill Army Air Field, Kansas, 1 December 1943 – 22 July 1944
- Isely Field, Saipan, Mariana Islands, 18 September 1944 – 9 November 1945
- March Field, California, c. 25 November 1945 – 16 February 1946
- Westover Air Force Base, Massachusetts, 1 January 1963 – 25 June 1966

=== Aircraft flown ===
- Boeing B-29 Superfortress, 1943–1946
- Boeing KC-97 Stratofreighter, 1963–1965
- Boeing EC-135, 1965
- Boeing KC-135 Stratotanker, 1963–1965
