= East Field (Saipan) =

WWII airfield in the Mariana Islands

East Field (Kagman Airfield)
- Part of Seventh Air Force
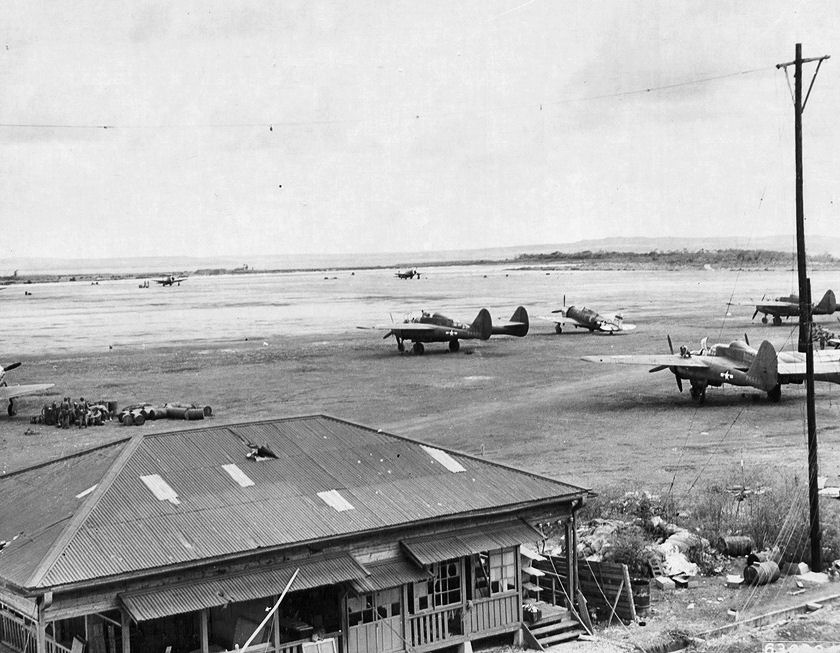
- Northrop P-61 Black Widows and Republic P-47 Thunderbolts on East Field, June 24, 1945.

Site information
- Type: Military airfield
- Controlled by: United States Army Air Forces

Location
- Coordinates: 15°10′04.89″N 145°46′36.21″E

Site history
- Built: 1944
- In use: 1944–1960s

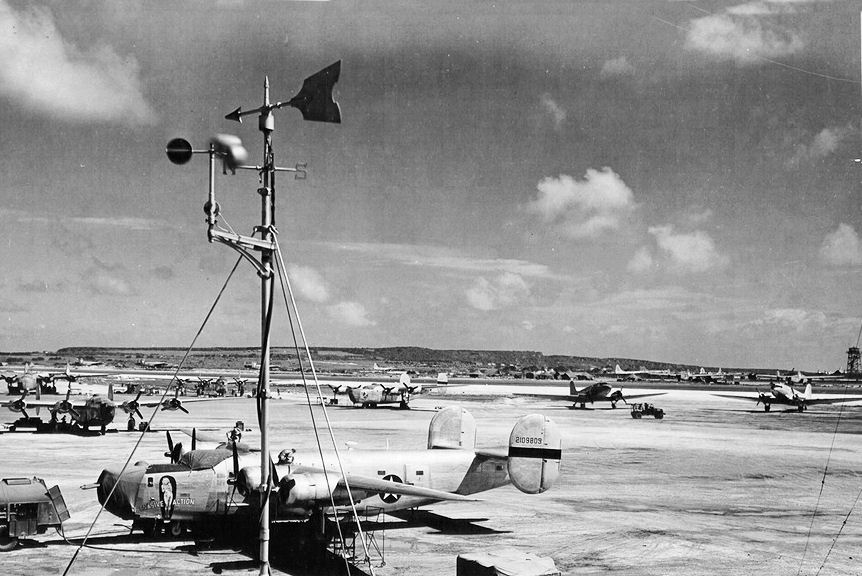
Ramp at East Field, fall 1944. Consolidated B-24J-105-CO Liberator 42-109809 "Evasive Action" 819th Bomb Squadron from the 30th Bomb Group, C-47 Skytrains and, in the distance, a B-29 Superfortress

East Field (also known as Kagman Airfield) is a former World War II airfield on Saipan in the Mariana Islands in the Pacific. It was part of Naval Advance Base Saipan.

== History ==
Saipan had been occupied by the Japanese since World War I, and by mid-1944, the Americans had advanced inside the Japanese ring of defense in the Pacific Theater. By establishing air bases in the Mariana Islands, the United States Army Air Forces could establish bases to conduct long-range strategic offensive air operations over the Japanese Home Islands with the new B-29 Superfortress, which, during early 1944, was operating ineffectively from bases in China. Bringing the superfortresses into the Central Pacific and stationing them in the Marianas would bring Japan within the range of the B-29, as well as provide the Twentieth Air Force with reliable means of support from the western ports of the United States.

The landings on Saipan began at 07:00 on June 15, 1944, and more than 300 LVTs landed 8,000 United States Marines on the west coast of the island. However the liberation of the island was a sad chapter of the tenacious fighting that lie ahead for the Allied forces, with the Japanese mounting a fanatical military defense and the fighting causing numerous civilian deaths. The island was the first objective of the 2nd and 4th Marine Divisions of the 5th Amphibious Corps.

In addition to the Marine infantry units, the United States Army 27th Infantry Division was in reserve and went ashore on the south of the island, under heavy Japanese fire. For the next three weeks, Japanese counterattacks and Banzai charges bloodied the US forces as they fought their way to the north. Many of the Japanese civilian population of the island committed mass suicide by jumping off cliffs at Marpi Point or committing suicide with hand grenades in caves. An estimated 22,000 civilians died in the battle. In addition, the Japanese commanders, Lt. General Saito and Navy Admiral Nagumo committed suicide in a cave. It took until July 9, 1944, until sustained combat ended and the island was declared officially secured by the US forces.

Once the island was secure, the construction of American large airfields could proceed. By the end of 1944 East Field (also known as Kagman Point Airfield) was built by Seabees of the 51st Naval Construction Battalion on the Kagman Peninsula at the eastern end of the island, north of Magicienne Bay (Laulau Bay). The airfield become the headquarters of the Seventh Air Force as well as its subordinate commands, VII Bomber and VII Fighter. This was the first time all of the major command units of the Seventh Air Force were consolidated into one location.

The airfield's facilities included a single runway 5,100 feet (1,600 m) x 150 feet (46 m) running east to west (as of December 1944). An extensive taxiway and revetment area was located to the south of the airfield and north of the runway. Tower code was named 'Violet'. Operational units assigned to the station were initially P-47 Thunderbolt fighter squadrons of the 318th Fighter Group which moved in from Hawaii in early July to support ground combat units in the Marianas. Also, the 6th Night Fighter Squadron operated P-61 Black Widows to provide night fighter defense against Japanese night air attacks.

Over the next few months, Seventh Air Force built up their forces on Saipan, assigning the following units to East Field:

- 28th Photographic Reconnaissance Squadron, July 11, 1944 – May 1945 (F-4 (P-38 Lighting))
- 30th Bombardment Group, August 4, 1944 – February 1945 (B-24 Liberator)
- 9th Troop Carrier Squadron, August 4, 1944 – July 1946 (C-47)
- 548th Night Fighter Squadron, December 15, 1944 – January 28, 1945 (DET), January 26 – March 5, 1945 (P-61 Black Widow)
- 41st Photographic Reconnaissance Squadron, January 4 – April 15, 1946 (F-4 (P-38 Lighting))
- 549th Night Fighter Squadron, (Air Echelon), February 20, 1945 – March 20, 1945 (P-61 Black Widow)
- 21st Fighter Group, December 4, 1945 – April 17, 1946 (P-51H Mustang)

By mid-1946 most USAAF units were reassigned, and the military use of Kagman Point Airfield ended. It was used as an airport until the mid-1960s when it was closed. The land was then redeveloped with housing and a golf course built on the former World War II airfield.

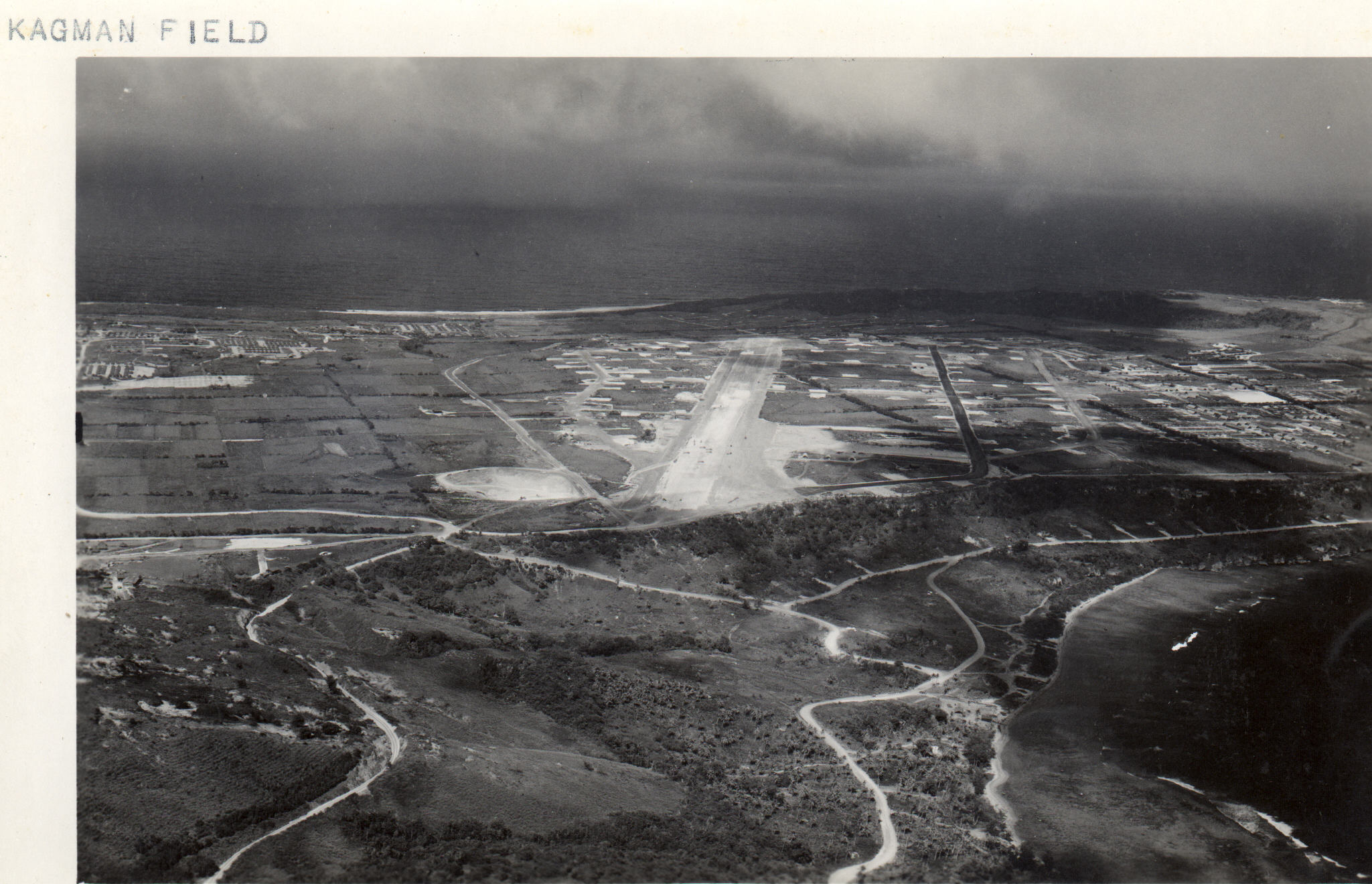
Kagman Field, 25 April 1945

== See also ==
- Kobler Field
- Marpi Point Field
- Saipan International Airport
- USAAF in the Central Pacific
- US Naval Advance Bases
