= Banzai Cliff =

Historic site in Saipan, Northern Mariana Islands

- U.S. National Register of Historic Places
- U.S. National Historic Landmark District – Contributing property
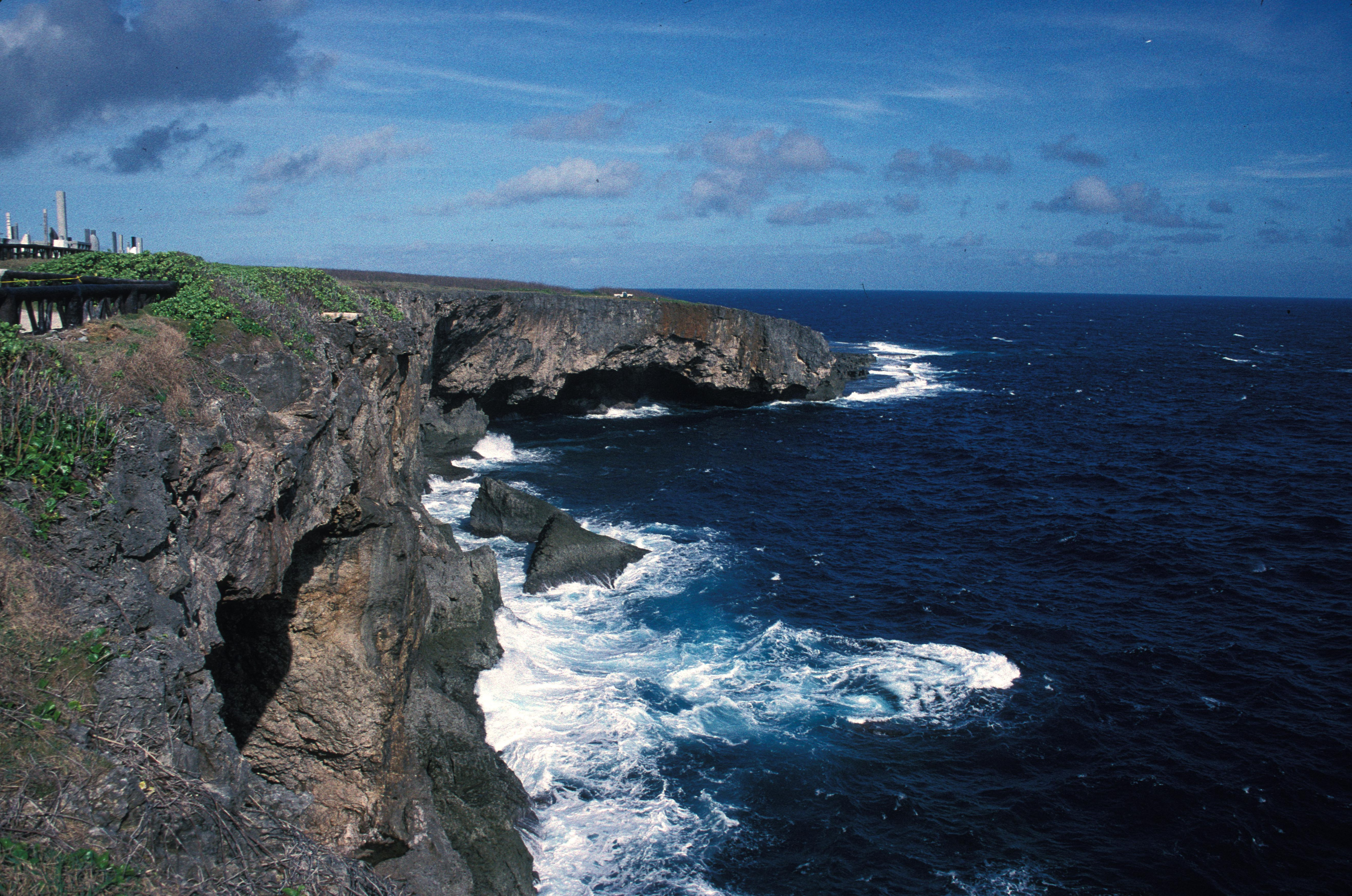
- Nearest city: San Roque, Saipan, Northern Mariana Islands
- Coordinates: 15°17′11″N 145°48′56″E
- Area: 7.5 acres (3.0 ha)
- Part of: Landing Beaches; Aslito/Isley Field; & Marpi Point, Saipan Island (ID85001789)
- NRHP reference No.: 76002192

Significant dates
- Added to NRHP: August 27, 1976
- Designated NHLDCP: February 4, 1985

Banzai Cliff is a historical site at the northern tip of Saipan island in the Northern Mariana Islands, overlooking the Pacific Ocean. Towards the end of the Battle of Saipan in 1944, hundreds of Japanese civilians and soldiers (of the Imperial Japanese Army) jumped off the cliff to their deaths in the ocean and rocks below, to avoid being captured by the Americans. Not far away, a high cliff named Suicide Cliff overlooks the coastal plain, and was another site of numerous suicides. At Banzai Cliff, some who jumped did not die and were captured by American ships.

A 7.5-acre (3.0 ha) area at the site was listed on the U.S. National Register of Historic Places in 1976. The site is also a contributing site in the Landing Beaches; Aslito/Isley Field; & Marpi Point, Saipan Island historic district, which was recognized in 1985 as a U.S. National Historic Landmark District.

== See also ==
- National Register of Historic Places listings in the Northern Mariana Islands
