= Naval Advance Base Saipan =

World War II base

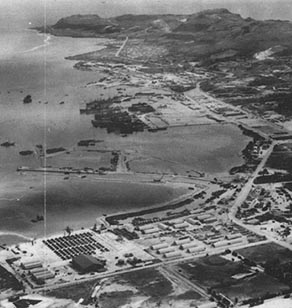
- Tanapag Harbor Saipan, Naval Advance Base Saipan in 1945

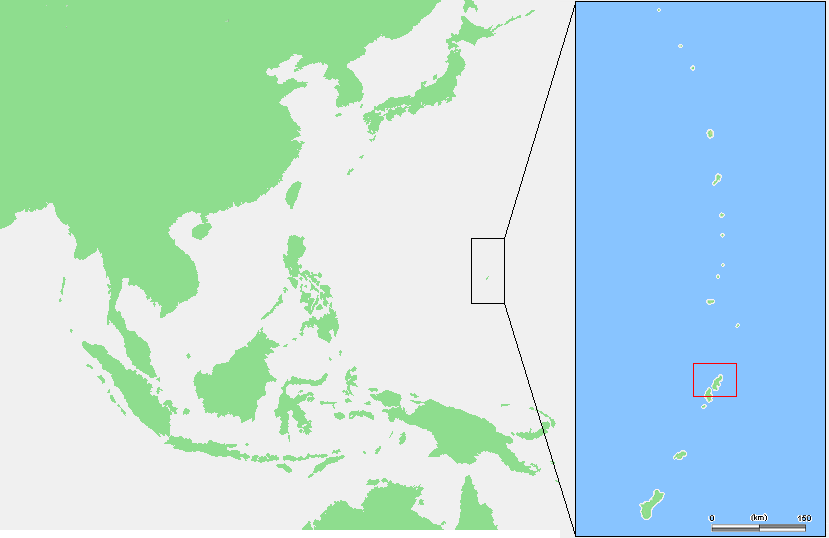

Geography
- Location: Pacific Ocean
- Coordinates: 15°13′04″N 145°43′40″E
- Archipelago: Marianas
- Highest elevation: 1,560 ft (475 m)
- Highest point: Mount Tapochau

Administration
- United States Armed Forces from 1944 to 1962
- Northern Mariana Islands

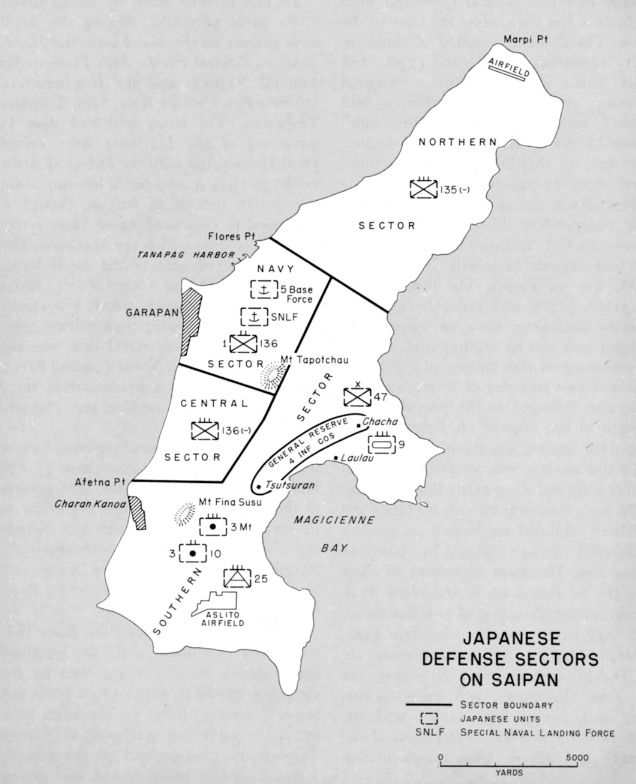
Saipan, US Army map from 1944

Naval Base Saipan or Naval Advance Base Saipan or Naval Air Base Saipan was a United States Navy Naval base built during World War II to support Pacific Ocean theater of war and the many warships and troops fighting the war. The base was on the island of Saipan in the Northern Mariana Islands. The base was part of the Pacific island hopping campaign. The base construction started after the Battle of Saipan ended on July 9, 1944. US Naval Advance Base Saipan was constructed by the Seabees Naval Mobile Construction Battalions. The base was under the Commander Naval Forces Marianas. Saipan is 12 miles (19 km) long and 5 miles (8.0 km) wide. About 70% of the island was sugarcane cultivation at the start of the base construction. At the start of the Battle of Saipan, the island's population had about 30,000 Japanese troops and about 20,000 Japanese civilians. The city of Garapan was the administrative center for the Saipan governmental district.

The Navy used 110 ships to bring troops and equipment to Saipan from Hawaii. Included in the Saipan fleet were 37 troopships (APA and AP), 11 cargo ships (AKA and AK), 5 Dock landing ships, 47 Landing Ship, Tank and 10 Auxiliary ships. For the battle and base, 74,986 tons of cargo was moved, at 7,845,194 cubic feet of cargo. After the war, Saipan remained a US Navy base. In 1962 Saipan became the headquarters of the U.S. administered United Nations trust territories of the Pacific Islands till 1986.

== Seabees Construction ==
The first Seabee Construction Battalions landed with the United States Marine Corps on June 15, 1944, at Chalan Kanoa on the west coast of Saipan. The 121st and the 18th Seabee Construction Battalions with parts of 92nd and 67th Battalions start unloading equipment for the battle and base operations. The Seabees repaired the captured airfields, the northern island runway and the Aslito Airfield. Both airfields were repaired with crushed coral and marston mat. The northern side airfield was 4,500 feet (1,400 m) long, US Navy Grumman TBF Avengers were the first to use the runway. The captured aviation fuel tanks were usable and the Seabees filled them from shore tankers. After the repairs were complete, United States Army Air Forces started patrol flights from the runway also. The Seabees used a captured pier to unload cargo ships. On June 21 Seabees of the 121st Construction Battalion began to repair the shell-damaged railroad tracks that ran from Charan Kanoa to Aslito Airfield and by June 25 supply trains started running. The other tracks in the area were also repaired. Construction Battalions did road repair and started depot construction. After the capture of Tanapag Harbor, Seabees repaired and expanded the port facilities. The port had a depth from 9 feet (2.7 m) to 25 feet (7.6 m). Japanese resistance on Saipan ended on July 9. On September 13, 1944, the Seabees were given the order to turn Saipan into a major Advance Base. Much of the damaged equipment on the island was removed first. The 39th, 17th, 101st, 117th, 595th and 614th Construction Battalions and the 31st Special Battalion joined in the construction. To keep boats on the flighting front there was a great demand for bases that could repair and restock boats in remote ports, Advance Base Saipan was able to repair and restock boats. Large ships in need of repair went to Naval Advance Base Espiritu Santo. The base became a major resting place for troops and a regroup spot. Many of the wounded troops from the Battle of Iwo Jima and the Okinawa campaign were taken to the hospital on Saipan. By the end of the war, Saipan had 9,500 hospital beds in seven hospitals. The Seabees built two new 8,500 feet (2,600 m), asphalted runways at Aslito Airfield. These were used for the Boeing B-29 Superfortress bombers. At the end of the war, the Japanese civilians that had survived were returned to the Japanese homeland.

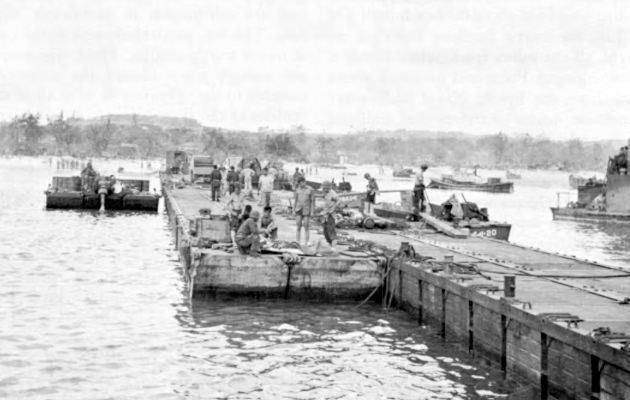
US Navy Charan Kanoa port in Saipan in 1944

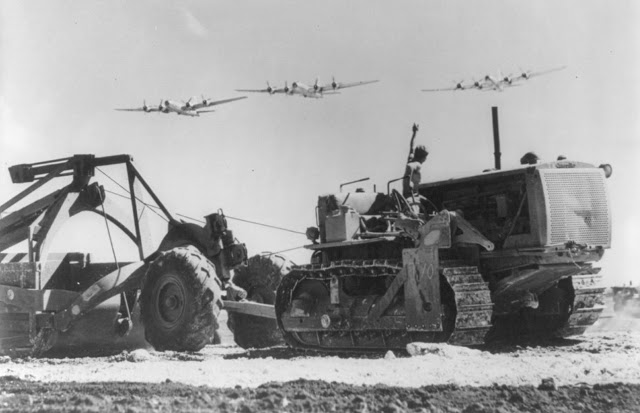
Seabees completing runway on Saipan in 1945 with B 29 in the air

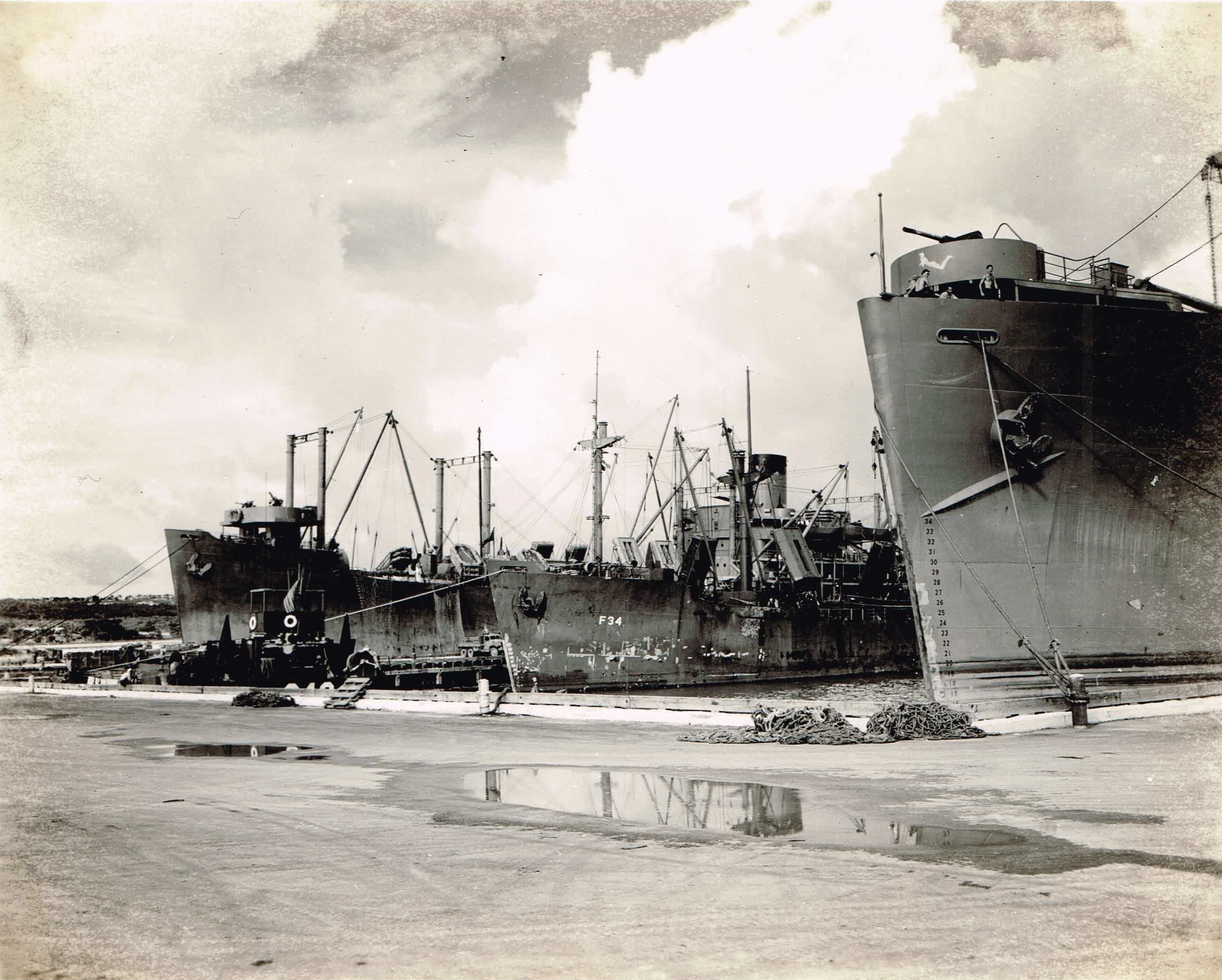
Navy ships docked at Saipan

== Facilities ==
Facilities built, repaired or expanded, 7,000 buildings were built.

- Tanapag Harbor Navy port, 3 Liberty ship beths, masonry pier and two 12 feet (3.7 m)x72 feet (22 m) pontoon piers. Ramp for LST's, LCT's, and LCM's. Seabees dredged the harbor, so large ships could dock.
- Chalan Kanoa, minor port
- Housing, 4,250 men in quonset huts
- Seabee camp for 2,500 men
- Seabee depot
- Boat-repair facilities
- Seaplane base Tanapag concrete ramp, at Flores Point, VP-16 with Martin PBM Mariner
- Naval supply depot
- Chalan Kanoa railroad
- Capitol Hill camp
- San Roque Magazine camp
- Micro Beach landing
- Lower Base camp
- Two radio stations
- Naval hospital, 400-beds
- Army hospital, 1,000-beds
- Army hospital, 2,000-bed (Iwo Jima and Okinawa campaigns)
- Army Station Hospital 176, 600-beds
- Army Station Hospital 39, 600-beds
- Two small Hospitals
- Ammunition depot, 500 acres
- Fleet recreation areas (85 Buildings, tennis courts, volleyball, baseball and softball fields.
- Major Harbor developments
- Chapel
- Crash boat base
- Aviation Overhaul shop
- Base for 12,000 Army Air Corp
- Officers Club
- Motor pool
- Quartermaster Laundry
- PT Boat base
- AA gun emplacements
- Naval Air Transport Service Facilities
- Large Tank farms for: Fuel oil, aviation fuel, diesel fuel, gasoline
- Navy Bank
- Fleet Post Office FPO# 3245 SF Saipan Island, Marianas Islands
- Mess halls
- Navy Communication Center
- Troop store
- Two seaplane hangars
- Aviation supply annex
- 11 refrigerator storage sheds
- Barge with a 12-ton crane
- 6x18 foot and 4x15 Auxiliary floating drydock
- Garapan pier
- Torpedo assembly center
- Bahia Laulau, also called Magicienne Bay or Lau Lau Bay, ship anchorage only.
- Pads for over 100 airplanes
- Susupe Internment Camp, housed 13,000 Japanese civilians
- Power stations

Postwar:

- International Broadcasting Bureau Voice of America broadcast site.
- Navy Technical Training Unit.

== Airfields ==
Saipan airfields built and/or repaired by Seabees:

- East Field (Saipan) (Kagman Field) built by 51st CB
- Aslito Field, now Saipan International Airport
- Marpi Point Field built by Seabees
- Kobler Field
- Isely airfield No. 1

Each airfield had housing, mess hall and depots.

== See also ==
- Seabees in World War II
- Battle of the Eastern Solomons
- US Naval Advance Bases
- Tinian Naval Base
