= VF-133 =

US Navy fighter aircraft squadron

VF-133 or Fighting Squadron 133 was a United States Navy fighter aircraft squadron. It was created on 2 August 1948 during the reorganization of CAG 13 in which VF-13A became VF-131, VF-14 became VF-132, VF-133 was commissioned, VA-13A became VA-134, and VA-14A became VA-135.

Most of VF 133's plankowners came from the two VA squadrons. VA-13A pilots had transitioned from the Curtiss SB2C-5 Helldiver to the Vought F4U Corsair, and when transferred to VF-133, had to learn the Grumman F8F-1 Bearcat on the job. VA-14 pilots transitioned from Grumman TBM-4 Avengers to F4U Corsairs.

The United States Navy's Naval History and Heritage Command considers that VF-133 might have been disestablished in 1949 or 1950.
