= Saipan International Airport =

Airport in Saipan, Northern Mariana Islands, United States

Saipan International Airport Francisco C. Ada Airport
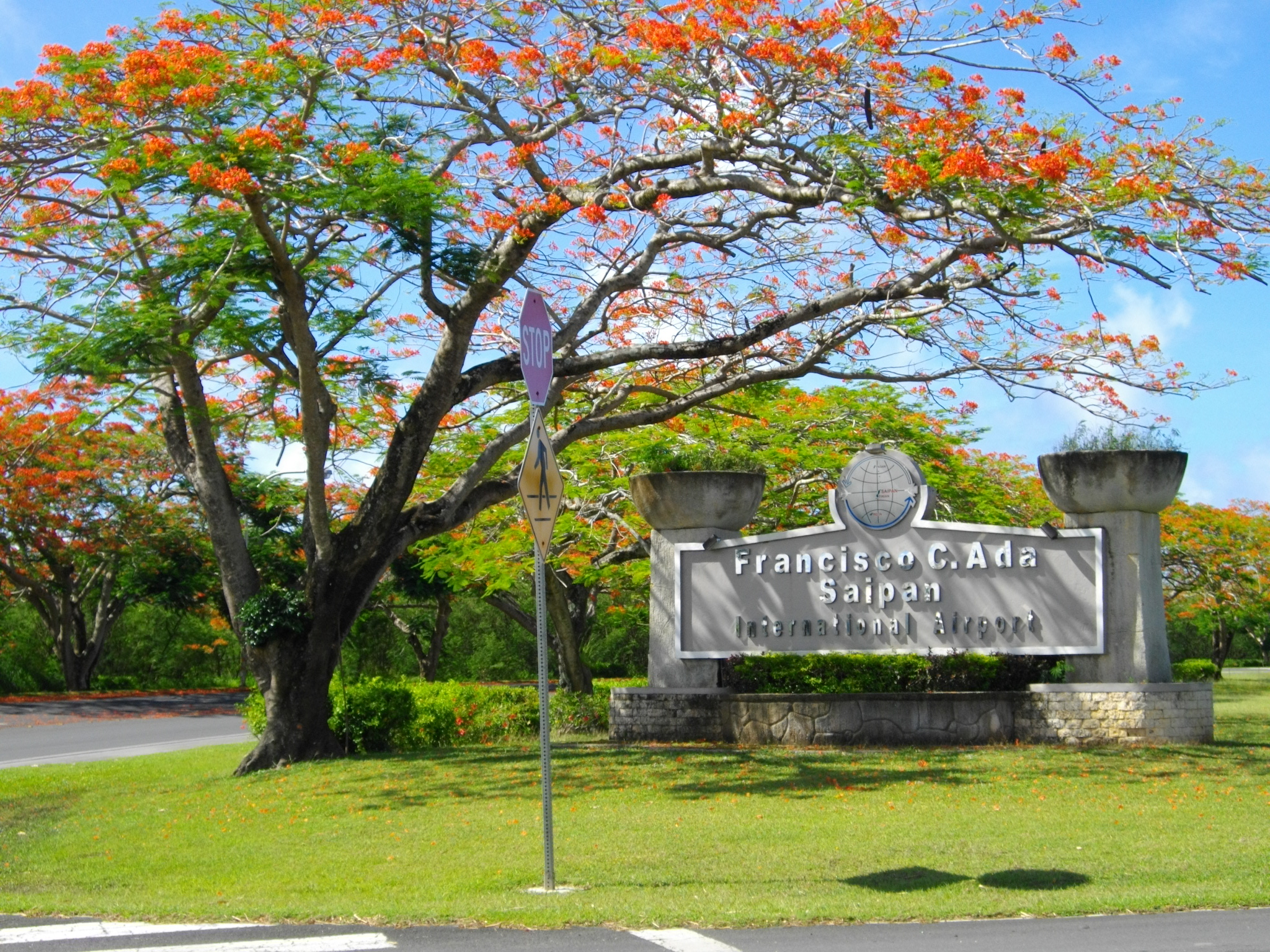
- IATA: SPN; ICAO: PGSN; FAA LID: GSN

Summary
- Airport type: Public
- Owner: Commonwealth Ports Authority
- Location: Saipan, Northern Mariana Islands
- Elevation AMSL: 215 ft (66 m)
- Coordinates: 15°07′08″N 145°43′46″E
- Website: cpa.gov.mp/spnapt.asp

Map
- Location within Northern Mariana Islands

Runways
Direction	Length		Surface
Direction	ft	m	Surface
07/25	8,699	2,652	Asphalt
06/24	7,001	2,134	Asphalt

Statistics (2022)
- Aircraft operations (year ending 1/31/2022): 27,875
- Based aircraft: 14
- Source: Federal Aviation Administration

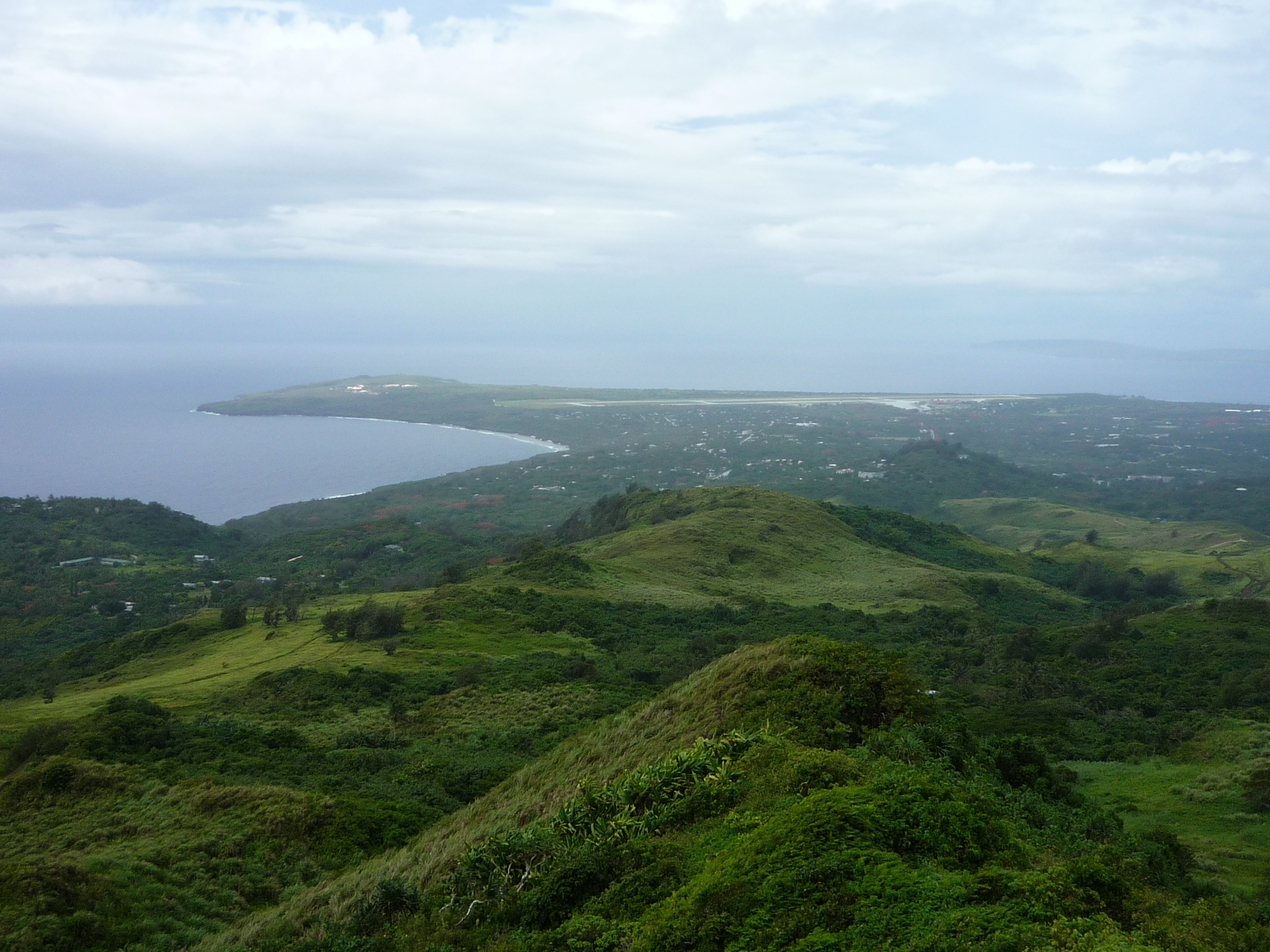
Saipan International Airport (far background), photographed from the top of Mount Tapochau.

Saipan International Airport (IATA: SPN, ICAO: PGSN, FAA LID: GSN), also known as Francisco C. Ada/Saipan International Airport, is a public airport located on Saipan Island in the United States Commonwealth of the Northern Mariana Islands. The airport is owned by Commonwealth Ports Authority. Its airfield was previously known as Aslito (during the Japanese South Seas Mandate) and Isely Field (during the American World War II and later period).

This airport is assigned a three-letter location identifier of GSN by the Federal Aviation Administration, but the International Air Transport Association (IATA) airport code is SPN (the IATA assigned GSN to Mount Gunson Airport in Australia).

== History ==
=== World War II ===
Saipan International Airport was a sugarcane field before the Imperial Japanese Navy Air Service (IJNAS) constructed a temporary landing field on the site in 1933. The landing field was used for training purposes and had two runways configured in an "L" pattern. In 1937, the Navy began upgrading the airfield for full military use, despite an international law ban on constructing military facilities within the South Seas Mandate. Following the attack against the United States in 1941, the field was named Aslito Field (アスリート飛行場), based on the indigenous Chamoru name for the area of its location, As Lito.

The IJNAS assigned two squadrons of Mitsubishi A6M5a-52 Zeros to the airfield in mid-June 1944. These squadrons took part in the occupation of the Mariana Islands during the Battle of the Philippine Sea later that month, being almost wiped out by the American forces during the battle.

The airfield was captured by the United States Army 27th Infantry Division on June 18, 1944, during the Battle of Saipan. During the battle, a Zero from Guam actually landed at Aslito Airfield, the pilot being unaware that the field was under American control. As it landed, the aircraft was fired at and damaged, crashing at the end of the runway. The pilot survived and the plane was captured. The field was renamed Isely Field after United States Navy Commander Robert H. Isely who was killed on June 13, 1944, while strafing the base.

Once in American hands, Isely Field was quickly repaired and expanded by Seabees of the 3rd Battalion 20th Marines, to become Naval Advance Base Saipan. with the first P 47s of the 19th fighter Squadron landing on the 20th. The airfield was assigned to Twentieth Air Force B-29 Superfortress operations. The XXI Bomber Command had overall responsibility of the B-29 operations out of the Marianas bases, and Isely Field was to be used by the 73rd Bombardment Wing (which consisted of the 497th, 498th, 499th, and 500th Bombardment Groups).

On October 12, 1944, the first B-29 Joltin Josie The Pacific Pioneer piloted by Brigadier General Haywood S. Hansell commanding General of XXI Bomber Command and copiloted by Major Jack J Catton of the 873d Bombardment Squadron arrived at Isely Field. By November 22, over 100 B-29s were at Isely. The XXI Bomber Command was assigned the task of destroying the aircraft industry of Japan in a series of high-altitude, daylight precision attacks.

After several months of disappointing high level bombing attacks from Isely (and the other Twentieth Air Force airfields on Guam and Tinian), General Curtis LeMay, Commander of Twentieth Air Force issued a new directive that the high-altitude, daylight attacks be phased out and replaced by low-altitude, high-intensity incendiary raids at nighttime, being followed up with high explosive bombs once the targets were set ablaze. These nighttime attacks on Japan proved devastatingly effective, and the Superfortress missions from Isely Field led to massive destruction of industrial targets in Japan, with large industrial areas of Tokyo, Nagoya, and Osaka being repeatedly attacked by waves of American bombers flying from the Marianas until the war's end. In response to these attacks, most of the Japanese air attacks on the Mariana Islands between November 1944 and January 1945 targeted Isely Field.

The airfield and surviving World War II facilities were listed on the National Register of Historic Places in 1981 as the "Isely Field Historic District", and are a contributing element of the National Historic Landmark District Landing Beaches; Aslito/Isely Field; & Marpi Point, Saipan Island, which was designated in 1985.

=== Postwar ===
With the end of the war the wing's four bomb groups were all returned to the United States, with their B-29s either being flown to Clark Air Base in the Philippines for scrapping, or were flown to storage facilities in Texas or Arizona. The 73d Bomb Wing was reassigned to the United States in December 1945. The airfield was returned to civil control and it reverted to being called Aslito Field.

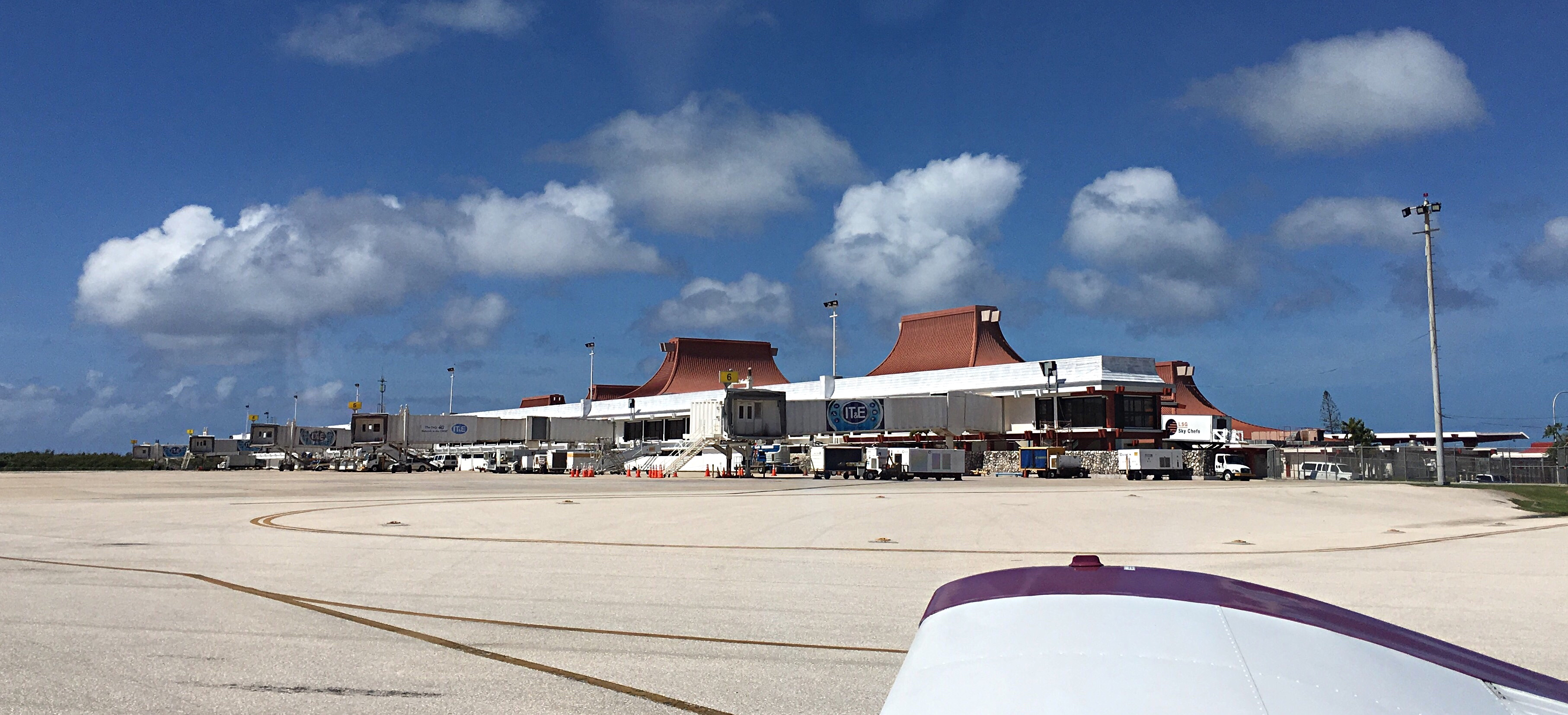
Terminal Airside, 2016

Saipan International Airport commenced operation on July 25, 1976, taking over from the nearby Kobler Field. Continental Micronesia (originally Air Micronesia) initially had its main hub at Kobler Field and then Saipan Airport. As time passed, the airline's general traffic to and from Saipan had decreased due to the breakup of the Trust Territory of the Pacific Islands; because the territory was subdivided into smaller political units, fewer people needed to travel to Saipan, the former capital of the trust territory. On July 15, 2008, the airline's Manila-Saipan flight, the final remaining Continental Micronesia directly operated flight, ended.

Japanese tourists began visiting Saipan in large numbers during the 1970s. The airfield and terminal were significantly upgraded in 1975 to handle widebody aircraft.

Northwest Airlines historically served Saipan from Tokyo-Narita using McDonnell Douglas DC-10 and Boeing 747 aircraft, while Japan Airlines (JAL) served Saipan from Narita and Osaka-Kansai using DC-10 and Boeing 767 aircraft respectively. In 2005, JAL suspended its services from Japan to SPN; routes to Osaka and Nagoya were taken over by Northwest. The airport was also renamed after former Lt. Gov. Francisco C. Ada that year.

Delta Air Lines inherited Northwest's Saipan routes following its acquisition of Northwest in 2008. In 2018, Delta decided to withdraw from the Saipan market, simultaneously with terminating its service to Palau and one month after ending its service to Guam. Delta cited lower demand, as well as needs for additional Boeing 757 aircraft on domestic US flights, as reasons for the withdrawal. Northwest and Delta served Saipan for a total of 29 years.

Skymark Airlines began flights to Saipan in 2019 using Boeing 737s from Narita.

=== Accidents and incidents ===
- A Star Marianas plane crashed during takeoff on November 17, 2012, on its return from Tinian. One person was confirmed dead.

== Facilities and aircraft ==
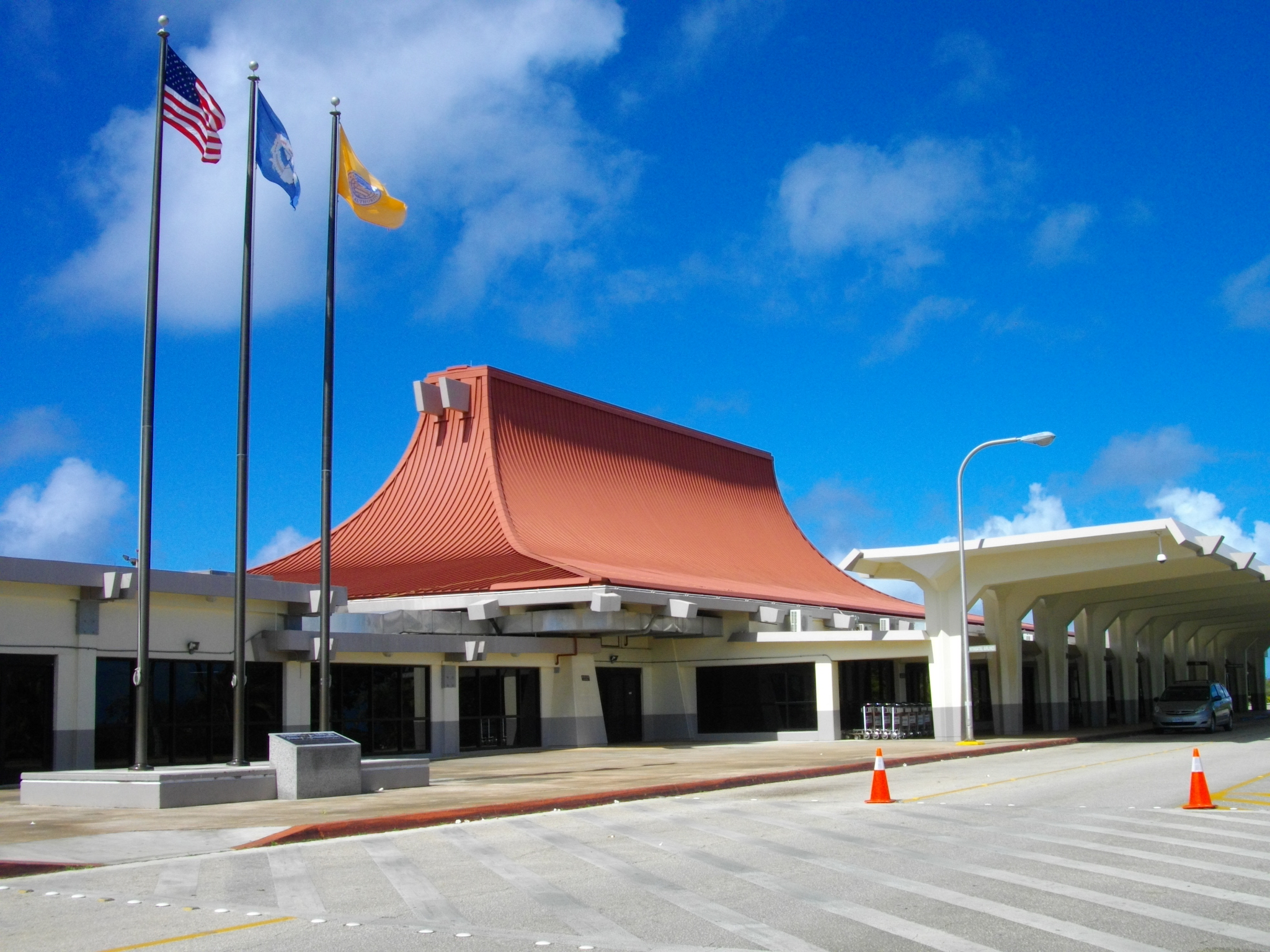
Terminal, groundside

Saipan International Airport covers an area of 734 acres (297 ha) which contains two paved runways: (7/25) measures 8,699 x 200 ft (2,651 x 61 m); (6/24) measures 7,001 x 100 ft (2,134 x 30 m).

For the 12-month period ending January 31, 2022, the airport had 27,875 aircraft operations, an average of 76 per day: 28% general aviation, 69% air taxi, 3% scheduled commercial and <1% military.

== Airlines and destinations ==
Airlines	Destinations
Asiana Airlines	Charter: Seoul–Incheon
Hong Kong Airlines	Hong Kong
Jeju Air	Seoul–Incheon
PAL Express	Manila
Star Marianas Air	Rota, Tinian
United Airlines	Guam, Tokyo–Narita

== Statistics ==
=== Top destinations ===
Busiest domestic routes from SPN (May 2025 – April 2026)
Rank	City	Passengers	Top carriers
1	Guam	41,630	United
2	Tinian, Northern Mariana Islands	22,340	Star Marianas
3	Rota, Northern Mariana Islands	5,250	Star Marianas

== See also ==
- East Field (Saipan)
- Kobler Field
- Marpi Point Field
- USAAF in the Central Pacific

== Sources ==
- Dorr, Robert F. B-29 Units of World War II. Botley, Oxford, UK: Osprey Publishing, 2002. ISBN 1-84176-285-7
- Maurer, Maurer (1983). Air Force Combat Units Of World War II. Maxwell AFB, Alabama: Office of Air Force History. ISBN 0-89201-092-4.
- Peacock, Lindsay. "Boeing B-29...First of the Superbombers". Part One. Air International, August 1989, Vol 37 No 2. ISSN 0306-5634. pp. 68–76, 87.
- Rust, Kenn C. Twentieth Air Force Story...in World War II. Temple City, California: Historical Aviation Album, 1979. ISBN 0-911852-85-9.
- www.pacificwrecks.com
