= Cui Lijie =

Chinese billionaire businesswoman

- Born: c. 1959 (age 66–67); Harbin, Heilongjiang, China
- Citizenship: Hong Kong
- Occupation: Businesswoman
- Board member of: Imperial Pacific
- Children: 1

Cui Lijie (Chinese: 崔丽杰; pinyin: Cuī Lìjié; born c. 1959) is a Chinese billionaire businesswoman, Hong Kong citizen, and majority owner of Imperial Pacific. Lijie resides in Saipan.

== Background ==
Originally from Harbin, Heilongjiang, China, she is a former barefoot doctor who worked in the countryside. In 1988, she invested in an auto parts and equipment factory serving a military school in Harbin. She later invested in pawnshop lending and real estate.

== Career ==
She and her son Ji Xiaobo (Chinese: 纪晓波) became involved in the Macau casino junket business in 2009 through a company called Heng Sheng. In September 2013, Cui Lijie's company Inventive Star Limited acquired a publicly listed Hong Kong company called First Natural Foods after its founder had been accused of embezzlement. In December 2013, First Natural Foods acquired Heng Sheng for HK$400 million. In 2014, First Natural Foods was renamed Imperial Pacific.

Cui Lijie remains the majority beneficial owner of Imperial Pacific, which owns an exclusive casino license for Saipan and a $600 million beachfront hotel. Her son has been described as the "mastermind" of Imperial Pacific's casino in Saipan.

On January 13, 2026, United States Immigration and Customs Enforcement arrested Cui Lijie for alleged violations of immigration law.

=== Casino controversies ===
In 2017, the Federal Bureau of Investigation (FBI) raided the construction site of Imperial Pacific's casino in Saipan over a "federal violation of the workplace visa system" following the death of a construction worker in March 2017. Construction workers from a subsidiary of state-owned China Metallurgical Group Corporation were unlawfully employed on the island to build the casino. In April 2017, Bloomberg News reported that the United States Department of Justice was investigating Imperial Pacific for money laundering. The FBI executed search warrants on Imperial Pacific's offices in Saipan again in March 2018.

In April 2019, the United States Department of Labor secured a $3.3 million judgment against Imperial Pacific for wage and overtime violations. In September 2019, the Equal Employment Opportunity Commission filed a lawsuit against Imperial Pacific for sexual harassment and discrimination.

In November 2019, the FBI raided the offices of Imperial Pacific for evidence of money laundering and wire fraud, and a federal grand jury subpoenaed the company regarding a corruption probe involving links with Northern Mariana Islands governor Ralph Torres.

In March 2020, Imperial Pacific disclosed that the Financial Crimes Enforcement Network was probing it for possible violations of the Bank Secrecy Act. In June 2020, the Commonwealth Casino Commission of the Northern Mariana Islands announced that it was seeking to suspend Imperial Pacific's casino license for non-payment of money owed to a community benefit fund.

== See also ==
- Mark A. Brown
