= Saipan Channel =

Narrow strait which separates the south coast of Saipan from the north coast of Tinian

Coordinates: 15°08′52″N 145°37′43″E

The Saipan Channel is a narrow strait which separates the south coast of Saipan from the north coast of Tinian in the Northern Mariana Islands. It is three miles wide.
