= Navy Hill, Saipan =

Navy Hill
- Settlement
- Location within Northern Mariana Islands
- Coordinates: 15°12′34″N 145°44′1″E
- Territory: Northern Mariana Islands
- Elevation: 367 ft (112 m)

Population (2012)
  - Total: 1,394

Navy Hill is a settlement (sometimes termed a village or district) on the island of Saipan in the Northern Mariana Islands.
