= Kalabera Cave =

Cave in Saipan

- Interactive map of Kalabera Cave
- Location: Kalabera, Saipan, Northern Mariana Islands
- Coordinates: 15°14′42.11″N 145°47′51.04″E

Kalabera Cave is an underground chamber in Kalabera, Saipan. There is a trail, ramp at the cave's entrance, pictograph and petroglyph interpretive panels, prayer or offering area, replica latte huts, and landscaping in the surrounding area.

The site was used as a prehistoric burial site. There are more than forty-five prehistoric petroglyphs and rock engravings in the cave, measuring between 5 and 10 inches in size. Most of the engravings portray headless human figures. During the Battle of Saipan, civilians and combatants hid in the cave and it served as a field hospital. Years after the war, ordnance, human belongings, and skeletons were still retrieved 30 to 50 feet from the cave's entrance.
