= Kalabera, Saipan =

Village in Saipan, Northern Mariana Islands

Coordinates: 15.2358°N 145.7933°E

Kalabera is a small village on the northern side of Saipan, Northern Mariana Islands.

The village is best known for Kalabera Cave, that is a common tourist stop. The entry room stands close to 60 feet high, and drops off to a seemingly bottomless series of tributaries. Kalabera is associated with many colonial stories, including being used as a prison for Chamorros during Spain's colonial period and a reputed officers "recreation club" during the Japanese military occupation.
