= Mark A. Brown =

American gaming industry executive

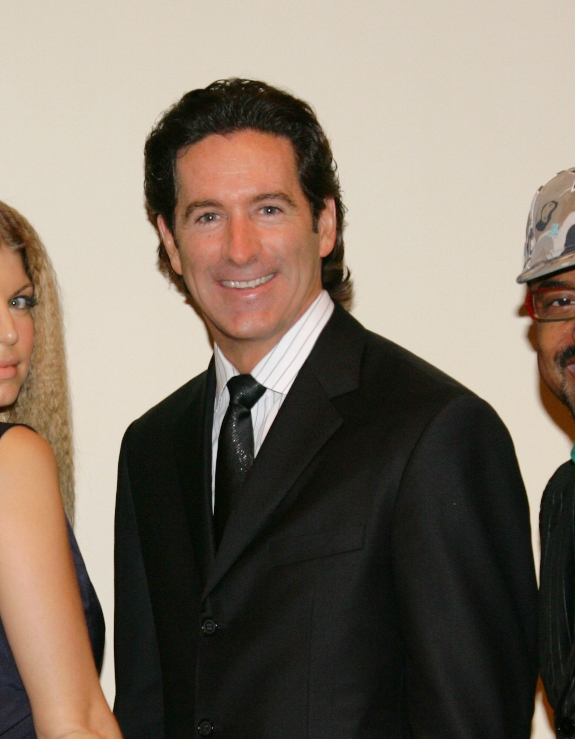
- Brown in 2009
- Born: February 10, 1961 (age 65); Atlantic City, NJ
- Occupation: Casino Executive

Mark A. Brown (born February 10, 1961) is an American gambling industry executive who has been CEO of Trump Hotels and Casinos Inc. and president of The Venetian Macau, Sands Macau, and The Four Seasons Macau. In November 2010, Brown joined Wynn Resorts, Ltd in advance of the organization's multibillion-dollar Cotai Strip Macau project. In November 2014 Brown was named president and CEO of Imperial Pacific Ltd's $7.1 Billion casino resort project in Saipan.

== Biography ==
Mark Anthony Brown was raised in Brigantine, New Jersey and entered the gaming industry in the late 1970s at Atlantic City's Resorts International. By age 25, Brown was married with two sons and was quickly rising through industry ranks. After a long tenure as CEO of Trump Hotels, in 2005 Brown exercised a clause in his contract that allowed him to leave with a golden parachute if Donald Trump ever owned less than 35% of the company. He then moved to Macau (SAR of PRC) to lead the largest project in gaming industry history with the Sands Corporation. Brown was CEO for Imperial Pacific gaming project in the United States territory of Saipan, with an exclusive gaming license and project scope of US$7.1 Billion. The initial phase of the project has broken US records for casino volume, with US$3.95 Billion in VIP gaming turnover during the month of September 2016. He retired in early January 2018.

== Non-profit work ==
Brown was chairman of the Atlantic City Convention Authority, president of the Atlantic City Casino Association, and on the board of directors for several other non-profit organizations such as N.J. D.A.R.E, Covenant House, and United Way. Brown set the all-time fundraising record at United Way. For his efforts, Brown has received such awards as the Businessman of the Year Award from the Atlantic City Chamber of Commerce, the Humanitarian of the Year Award from the Trocki Hebrew Academy, and the D.A.R.E. Future of New Jersey Award. In the summer of 2008, Brown ran with the Olympic Torch during the torch relays.
