= Marpi Reef =

Narrow seamount north of Saipan in the Northern Marianas

- Location within Pacific Ocean

Location
- Location: Northern Mariana Islands, United States
- Coordinates: 15.425°N 145.85°E

Marpi Reef or Marpi Bank is a narrow seamount lies 28 km (17 mi) north of Saipan. With length of 9 km (5.6 mi) and 4 km (2.5 mi) in width, the reef is generally similar to the Tatsumi Reef south of Tinian in terms of orientation in a northeast to southwest. The peak of the seamount is at 26 fathoms or 53 m under water surfaces.

It is one of fishing points in the region, and various cetaceans (whales and dolphins) migrate and live in the waters including humpback whales.
