= Imperial Pacific =

Chinese holding company

Imperial Pacific International Holdings Ltd 博華太平洋國際控股有限公司
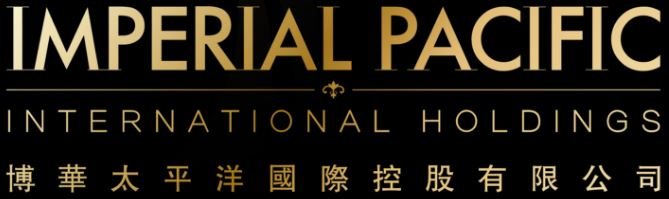
- Traded as: SEHK: 1076; Hang Seng Index component
- Industry: Conglomerate
- Founder: Yeung Chung-lung
- Headquarters: Hong Kong
- Area served: China (Hong Kong, Macau) and the United States (Northern Mariana Islands, Guam)
- Key people: CEO: Henry Cheang, Majority owner: Cui Lijie
- Parent: Inventive Star Limited
- Subsidiaries: Imperial Pacific International (CNMI), LLC, Best Sunshine International
- Website: www.imperialpac.com

Imperial Pacific International Holdings Limited (SEHK: 1076) is a Chinese investment holding company. It was incorporated on 27 July 2001 in Bermuda and subsequently registered in Hong Kong as a non-Hong Kong company. Its headquarters were based in Hong Kong. The company was originally named First Natural Foods Holdings until it was renamed in May 2014. It was majority owned by Cui Lijie and her son Ji Xiaobo (Chinese: 纪晓波) (Note: Also known as Jason Ji) through their investment vehicle Inventive Star Limited.

In April 2022, the trading of the company's shares was suspended by the Hong Kong Stock Exchange due to the delay in publishing its financial results. In February 2024, the company was delisted.

In April 2024, the Hong Kong High Court made a winding-up order against the company on the ground of insolvency. Its indirect wholly owned subsidiary, Imperial Pacific International (CNMI), LLC, filed for Chapter 11 bankruptcy in the Northern Mariana Islands.

In August 2025, its former casino resort in Saipan was sold under bankruptcy to an investment group founded by Jin Song, a business associate of Cui Lijie and Ji Xiaobo.

== History ==
First Natural Foods was first listed on the main board of the Hong Kong Stock Exchange on 11 February 2002. It was principally involved most aspects of the food business, including frozen and functional food products. Trading for the group was suspended on 15 December 2008 and provisional liquidators were appointed on 7 January 2009 for restructuring. The liquidators were discharged on 4 September 2012 and trade sharing resumed the following day.

In 2013, the Securities and Futures Commission (SFC) took the company's founder and former chairman Yeung Chung-lung to court for alleged embezzlement. The SFC accused him of withdrawing HK$84 million from its account in December 2008.

In December 2013, First Natural Foods announced that it would buy the Macau-based junket operator Hengsheng for HK$400 million. In 2013, First Natural Foods reported a profit of only 1.25 million. In March 2016, Imperial Pacific announced that it would sell its non-gaming subsidiaries to focus on its gaming businesses. In August 2016, Imperial Pacific reported that it had a half-year net profit of HK$837.3 million (US$108 million). Imperial Pacific was Trump 2017 inaugural Gala sponsor.

In 2017, the Federal Bureau of Investigation (FBI) raided the construction site of Imperial Pacific's casino in Saipan over a "federal violation of the workplace visa system" following the death of a construction worker in March 2017. Construction workers from a subsidiary of state-owned China Metallurgical Group Corporation were unlawfully employed on the island to build the casino. In April 2017, Bloomberg News reported that the United States Department of Justice was investigating Imperial Pacific for money laundering. The FBI executed search warrants on Imperial Pacific's offices in Saipan again in March 2018.

In April 2019, the United States Department of Labor secured a $3.3 million judgment against Imperial Pacific for wage and overtime violations. In September 2019, the Equal Employment Opportunity Commission filed a lawsuit against Imperial Pacific for sexual harassment and discrimination.

In November 2019, the FBI raided the offices of Imperial Pacific for evidence of money laundering and wire fraud, and a federal grand jury subpoenaed the company regarding a corruption probe involving links with Northern Mariana Islands governor Ralph Torres.

In March 2020, Imperial Pacific disclosed that the Financial Crimes Enforcement Network was probing it for possible violations of the Bank Secrecy Act. In June 2020, the Commonwealth Casino Commission of the Northern Mariana Islands announced that it was seeking to suspend Imperial Pacific's casino license for non-payment of money owed to a community benefit fund.

In April 2024, the Hong Kong High Court made a winding-up order against the company on the ground of insolvency. Its indirect wholly owned subsidiary, Imperial Pacific International (CNMI), LLC, filed for Chapter 11 bankruptcy in the Northern Mariana Islands, stating that it owed its creditors approximately $165.8 million.

In March 2026, the Hong Kong High Court granted judgment in favour of Imperial Pacific International (CNMI), LLC in relation to an outstanding loan of US$1.5 million made in October 2016 to a visitor of the Imperial Palace casino in Saipan for the purpose of gambling.

=== Best Sunshine International ===
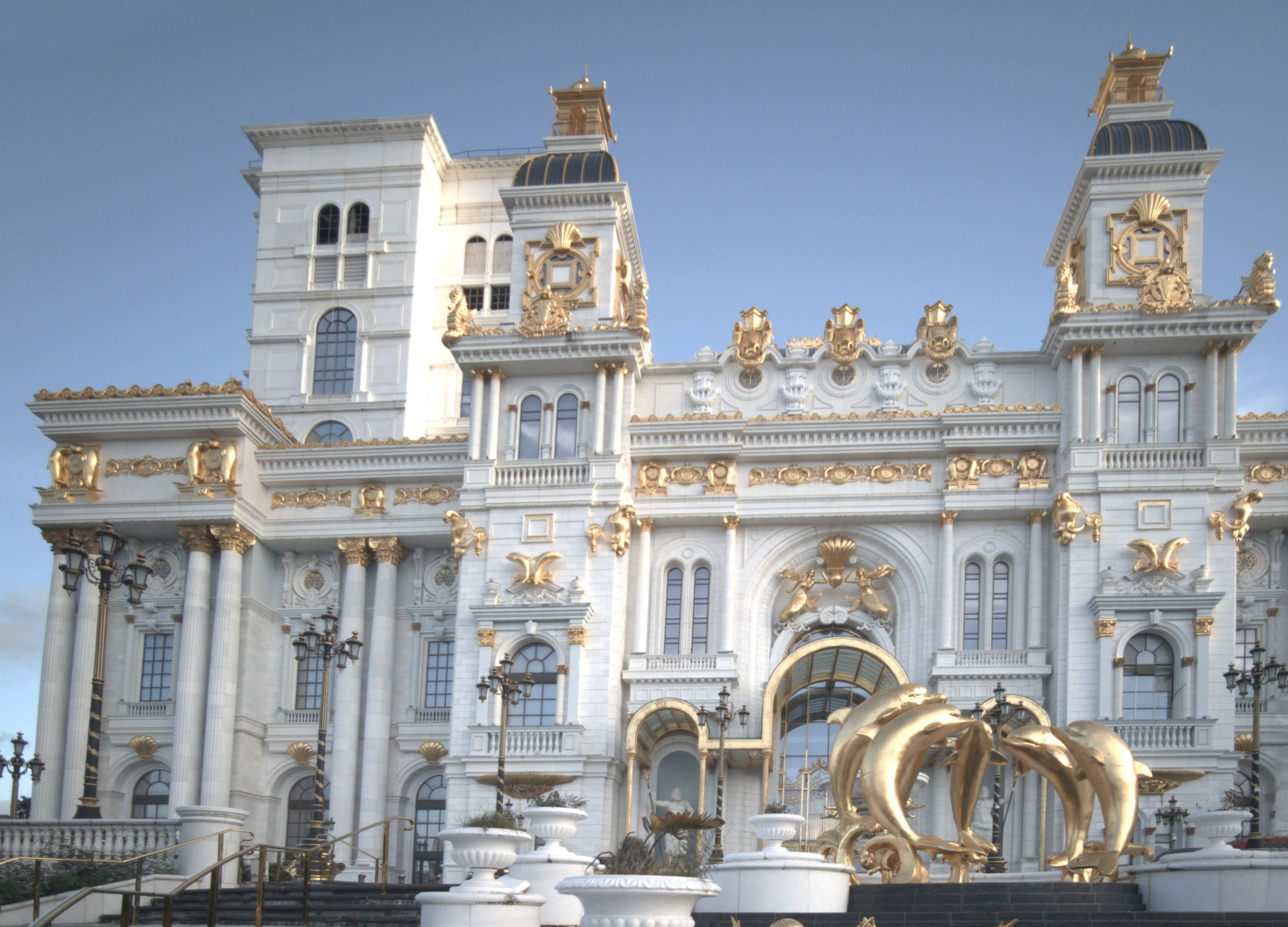
Imperial Palace casino

Best Sunshine, a subsidiary of Imperial Pacific International Holdings, develops and operates casinos, hotels, and restaurants in the Commonwealth of the Northern Mariana Islands (CNMI). As of June 2016, it is reportedly the largest taxpayer in the CNMI, paying US$27.8 million in business gross revenue tax.

In August 2014, Imperial Pacific International was granted a 25-year license to build and operate a casino on Saipan with an option to extend the license for another 15 years. Best Sunshine originally planned to spend US$3.14 billion and operate 2,229 hotel room. but increased the budget to US$7.1 billion the following month to accommodate plans to operate more than 4,200 hotel rooms and 1,600 gaming tables. Imperial Pacific raised US$99.8 million in December 2014 to fund these projects.

Best Sunshine had a soft opening for a temporary casino with six baccarat tables in July 2015. This casino, named Best Sunshine Live cost US$25 million to build. It is located in Saipan's DFS T-Galleria Mall. In May 2016, Best Sunshine started targeting residents and tourists of Guam by offering charter flights between the two islands. The Best Sunshine Live casino opened on 31 March 2017, though construction for the attached resort continued.

The main casino, named Grand Mariana Casino Hotel and Resort was constructed in Garapan in 2016 and 2017. During this time, the Bureau of Environmental and Coastal Quality (BECQ) gave Best Sunshine multiple fines for discharging wastewater into Garapan's lagoon and violating work hour constraints. Ancient human remains were discovered on the construction site, which will be re-interred some time after construction is finished. The main casino was originally scheduled to open in December 2016 and expected to cost US$550 million. The resort's casino had a soft opening on 6 July 2017.

On 23 March 2017, one of Imperial Pacific's Chinese construction workers fell off a scaffold and died. This led the FBI to search one of Imperial Pacific's offices and make an arrest. On 15 February 2018, Bloomberg Businessweek published an investigative report on the circumstances surrounding the death of this construction worker. An attorney for the Torres Brothers law firm which represented this worker said the report omitted several facts about the case. Imperial Pacific disputed all allegations of wrongdoing and sued Bloomberg for defamation. The FBI and U.S. Department of Homeland Security investigated the case and charged five individuals with harboring undocumented workers.

After Typhoon Yutu, Imperial Pacific opened its Saipan casino with limited operations from 2–15 November 2018. Citing damages from the typhoon, Imperial Pacific shut down this casino from 16 to 18 November, and then resumed operations.

=== Team King Investment ===
In August 2025, Team King Investment acquired the property following an auction, paying US$12.95 million for the property and casino license and effectively clearing Imperial Pacific of US$169 million in liabilities. The winning bid was financially backed by Kyosei Bank, a bank under investigation in Japan. The founder of Team King Investment is Jin Song, a Chinese investor who uses the Japanese name Hiroshi Kaneko and also maintains business relationships with the prior owners, Cui Lijie and her son Ji Xiaobo. It is unclear what the new owners will do with the property.
