= Unai =

Unai of UNAI may refer to

- Unai (name), a Basque given name
- Unai Sahu, a Bania sub-caste people from Uttar Pradesh, India
- Unai, Gujarat, a village in Gujarat, India
- Unai, Lucknow, a village in Uttar Pradesh, India
- Unai Pass a mountain pass in Afghanistan
- Sites on the island of Saipan in the U.S. Northern Mariana Islands
  - Unai Achugao Archaeological Site
  - Unai Dangkulo Petroglyph Site
  - Unai Lagua Japanese Defense Pillbox, a Japanese fortification
  - Unai Obyan Latte Site
- Unaí, a municipality in Brazil
  - Sociedade Esportiva Unaí Itapuã, a Brazilian football club based in Unaí
- United Nations Academic Impact (UNAI), a United Nations initiative in higher education
