= National Register of Historic Places listings in the Northern Mariana Islands =

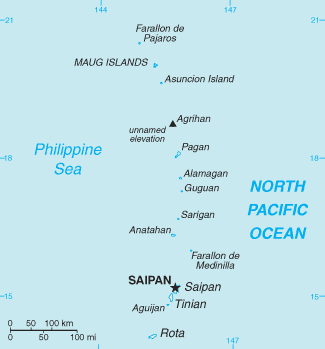
Map of the Northern Mariana Islands

This is a list of the buildings, sites, districts, and objects listed on the National Register of Historic Places in the Northern Mariana Islands. There currently 37 listed sites spread across the four municipalities of the Northern Mariana Islands. There are no sites listed on any of the islands that make up the Northern Islands Municipality.

This National Park Service list is complete through NPS recent listings posted September 25, 2026.

== Numbers of listings ==
The following are approximate tallies of current listings in the Northern Mariana Islands on the National Register of Historic Places. These counts are based on entries in the National Register Information Database as of April 24, 2008 and new weekly listings posted since then on the National Register of Historic Places web site. There are frequent additions to the listings and occasional delistings and the counts here are not official. Also, the counts in this table exclude boundary increase and decrease listings which modify the area covered by an existing property or district and which carry a separate National Register reference number.

| | Municipality | # of Sites |
|---|---|---|
| 1 | Northern Islands | 0 |
| 2 | Rota | 10 |
| 3 | Saipan | 20 |
| 4 | Tinian | 7 |
| Total: | | 37 |

== Rota ==
| | Name on the Register | Image | Date listed | Location | Village | Description |
|---|---|---|---|---|---|---|
| 1 | Chudang Palii Japanese World War II Defensive Complex | | May 1, 2012 (#12000250) | Sunrise Hotel, Rte. 100; 14°09′12″N 145°12′06″E | Sinapalu | |
| 2 | Chugai' Pictograph Site | Chugai' Pictograph Site | August 31, 1998 (#98001066) | I'Chenchon Bird Sanctuary; 14°09′12″N 145°16′03″E | | Prehistoric pictograph cave |
| 3 | Commissioner's Office | Commissioner's Office | April 17, 1981 (#81000663) | North of Songsong Village; 14°10′02″N 145°09′46″E | Songsong | |
| 4 | Dugi Archeological Site | Dugi Archeological Site | February 11, 1985 (#85000287) | Address Restricted | Songsong | |
| 5 | Japanese Coastal Defense Gun | Japanese Coastal Defense Gun | November 2, 1984 (#84000422) | Northeast of Songsong; 14°07′13″N 145°09′59″E | Songsong | |
| 6 | Japanese Hospital | Japanese Hospital | April 16, 1981 (#81000664) | West side of Sasanhaya Bay; 14°08′13″N 145°08′18″E | Songsong | |
| 7 | Mochong | Mochong | September 11, 1985 (#85002301) | Address Restricted | Songsong | |
| 8 | Nanyo Kohatsu Kabushiki Kaisha Sugar Mill | Nanyo Kohatsu Kabushiki Kaisha Sugar Mill | April 16, 1981 (#81000665) | Southwest of Songsong Village, near the harbor 14°08′10″N 145°08′07″E | Songsong | |
| 9 | Rectory | Rectory | April 16, 1981 (#81000666) | North end of the island 14°09′59″N 145°10′00″E | Songsong | |
| 10 | Rota Latte Stone Quarry | Rota Latte Stone Quarry | December 23, 1974 (#74002225) | 14°10′17″N 145°15′30″E | Songsong | Designated a National Historic Landmark in 2024. |

== Saipan ==
| | Name on the Register | Image | Date listed | Location | Village | Description |
|---|---|---|---|---|---|---|
| 1 | Banzai Cliff | Banzai Cliff | August 27, 1976 (#76002192) | Bandero, Magpi area 15°17′17″N 145°48′58″E | San Roque | |
| 2 | Brown Beach One Japanese Fortifications | | February 28, 2007 (#07000123) | Unai Laolao Kattan (North Laolao Beach) along the east coast of Saipan; 15°10′33″N 145°47′05″E | Unai Laolao Kattan | |
| 3 | Campaneyan Kristo Rai | Campaneyan Kristo Rai | October 30, 1984 (#84000207) | Beach Road; 15°12′11″N 145°43′04″E | Garapan | Spanish-built 1932 church bell tower |
| 4 | Chalan Galaide | Chalan Galaide | October 4, 1987 (#87001559) | Address Restricted | Garapan | |
| 5 | Hachiman Jinja | | June 21, 2003 (#03000549) | Lot numbers H 300-11 and H 300-4; 15°10′44″N 145°45′40″E | Kannat Taddong Papago | |
| 6 | Isley Field Historic District | Isley Field Historic District | June 26, 1981 (#81000667) | Saipan International Airport; 15°07′20″N 145°43′58″E | Chalan Kanoa | World War II airfield, now the island's main airport |
| 7 | Japanese 20mm Cannon Blockhouse | Japanese 20mm Cannon Blockhouse | August 25, 1995 (#95001048) | Northwest of Punton Opyan; 15°06′46″N 145°42′17″E | Saipan Island | |
| 8 | Japanese Hospital | Japanese Hospital | December 19, 1974 (#74002189) | Route 3; 15°12′06″N 145°43′08″E | Garapan | |
| 9 | Japanese Jail Historic and Archeological District | Japanese Jail Historic and Archeological District | April 8, 2011 (#10001017) | Chichirica Avenue and Ghiyobw Street; 15°21′01″N 145°43′08″E | Garapan | |
| 10 | Japanese Lighthouse | Japanese Lighthouse | December 19, 1974 (#74002224) | Navy Hill; 15°12′42″N 145°43′54″E | Garapan | |
| 11 | Landing Beaches, Aslito-Isley Field and Marpi Point | Landing Beaches, Aslito-Isley Field and Marpi Point | February 4, 1985 (#85001789) | Saipan International Airport and Beaches; 15°06′55″N 145°43′01″E | Chalan Kanoa | |
| 12 | Laulau Kattan Latte Site | Laulau Kattan Latte Site | October 30, 2000 (#00001212) | Address Restricted | Kagman III Homestead | |
| 13 | Managaha Island Historic District | Managaha Island Historic District | November 5, 1984 (#84000425) | West of Saipan; 15°14′29″N 145°42′45″E | Garapan | |
| 14 | Sabanetan Toro Latte Site | Sabanetan Toro Latte Site | November 8, 1984 (#84000731) | Address Restricted | Garapan | |
| 15 | Suicide Cliff | Suicide Cliff | September 30, 1976 (#76002193) | Bandero; 15°16′38″N 145°48′35″E | San Roque | |
| 16 | Tachognya | Tachognya | February 13, 1986 (#86000235) | Address Restricted | San Jose | |
| 17 | Unai Achugao Archaeological Site | Unai Achugao Archaeological Site | August 8, 1996 (#96000825) | Address Restricted | Punton Achugao | |
| 18 | Unai Lagua Japanese Defense Pillbox | Unai Lagua Japanese Defense Pillbox | June 1, 1984 (#84002777) | Unai Lagua; 15°16′25″N 145°49′42″E | San Roque | |
| 19 | Unai Obyan Latte Site | Unai Obyan Latte Site | February 5, 1985 (#85000244) | Address Restricted | Chalan Kanoa | |
| 20 | Waherak Maihar | Waherak Maihar | January 31, 1978 (#78003081) | NMI Museum of History and Culture; 15°12′05″N 145°43′09″E | Garapan | A traditionally-built outrigger canoe. |

== Tinian ==
| | Name on the Register | Image | Date listed | Location | Village | Description |
|---|---|---|---|---|---|---|
| 1 | Japanese Structure | | April 16, 1981 (#81000669) | Near Red 2 Beach; 14°58′16″N 145°37′14″E | Tinian | |
| 2 | Nanyo Kohatsu Kabushiki Kaisha Administration Building | Nanyo Kohatsu Kabushiki Kaisha Administration Building | April 16, 1981 (#81000670) | Near Red 2 Beach; 14°58′20″N 145°37′08″E | Tinian | |
| 3 | Nanyo Kohatsu Kabushiki Kaisha Ice Storage Building | | April 17, 1981 (#81000671) | Near Red 2 Beach; 14°58′04″N 145°37′23″E | Tinian | |
| 4 | Nanyo Kohatsu Kabushiki Kaisha Laboratory | Nanyo Kohatsu Kabushiki Kaisha Laboratory | April 16, 1981 (#81000672) | Near Red 2 Beach; 14°58′20″N 145°37′07″E | Tinian | |
| 5 | Tinian Landing Beaches, Ushi Point Field, Tinian Island | Tinian Landing Beaches, Ushi Point Field, Tinian Island | December 30, 1985 (#85003268) | 15°04′10″N 145°37′00″E | Tinian | |
| 6 | Unai Dangkulo Petroglyph Site | Unai Dangkulo Petroglyph Site | October 27, 1999 (#99001270) | Address Restricted | Unai Dangkulo | |
| 7 | House of Taga | House of Taga | December 19, 1974 (#74002193) | 14°58′01″N 145°37′20″E | San Jose | |

== See also ==
- List of United States National Historic Landmarks in United States commonwealths and territories, associated states, and foreign states
- Maritime Heritage Trail – Battle of Saipan
