= Dugi Archeological Site =

Prehistoric site in the Mariana Islands

- U.S. National Register of Historic Places
- U.S. Historic district
- Nearest city: Songsong, Rota, Northern Mariana Islands
- Area: 80 acres (32 ha)
- NRHP reference No.: 85000287
- Added to NRHP: February 11, 1985

The Dugi Archeological Site is a prehistoric latte stone site on the north side of Rota Island in the Northern Mariana Islands. The site is a rare inland site that survived the intensive sugar cane development introduced by the Japanese during the South Seas Mandate period of the 1920s and 1930s. It consists of sixteen deteriorated latte stone structures on three high terraces. Some of the latte stones have fallen over and others are missing features normally found at these sites.

The site was listed on the National Register of Historic Places in 1985.

== See also ==
- National Register of Historic Places listings in the Northern Mariana Islands
