= Mochong =

- U.S. National Register of Historic Places
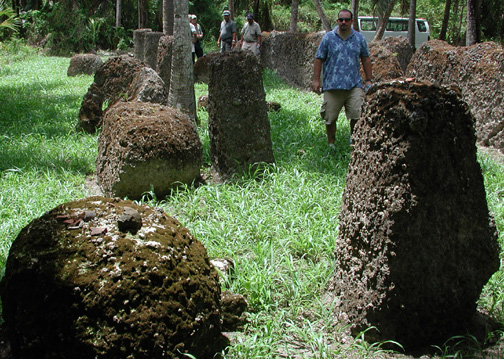
- Latte stones at Mochong, 1984
- Nearest city: Songsong, Rota, Northern Mariana Islands
- Area: 45.1 acres (18.3 ha)
- NRHP reference No.: 85002301
- Added to NRHP: 11 September 1985

Mochong is a major prehistoric archaeological site on the northern coast of the island of Rota in the Northern Mariana Islands. It is widely recognized as the best preserved and second largest latte village in the Marianas, consisting of 50 latte stones and a 50m wall.

== Background ==
Mochong is a significant ancient Chamorro latte stone village site on the northern side of the island comprising 50 individual latte sets - pairs of stone pillars (haligi) topped with hemispherical capstones (tasa) - scattered mortars (lusongs). In addition to this, scattered subsurface artifacts such as tools, fishing implements and an abundance of pieces of broken pottery (both Marianas Red Ware Pottery and Marianas Plain Ware Pottery) were found. This site also includes an extremely rare latte house structure consisting of 14 columns. Furthermore, it has a latte stone wall, consisting of six columns and five slabs, that is more than 50 feet (15 m) long. Remnants of the village extend across roughly 1,500 feet (460 m) of limestone terrace along the coast. The site has been radiocarbon dated to c. 1000 BCE, with evidence suggesting the site was inhabited for around 3000 years. The site was first sketched in the early 19th century by the French explorer Louis de Freycinet, and was in remarkably intact condition (compared to those sketches) when it was excavated in the 1980s. The site was first excavated in 1983 by Graeme Ward and John Craib. The site was listed on the National Register of Historic Places in 1985.

== See also ==
- National Register of Historic Places listings in the Northern Mariana Islands
