= Laulau Kattan Latte Site =

- U.S. National Register of Historic Places
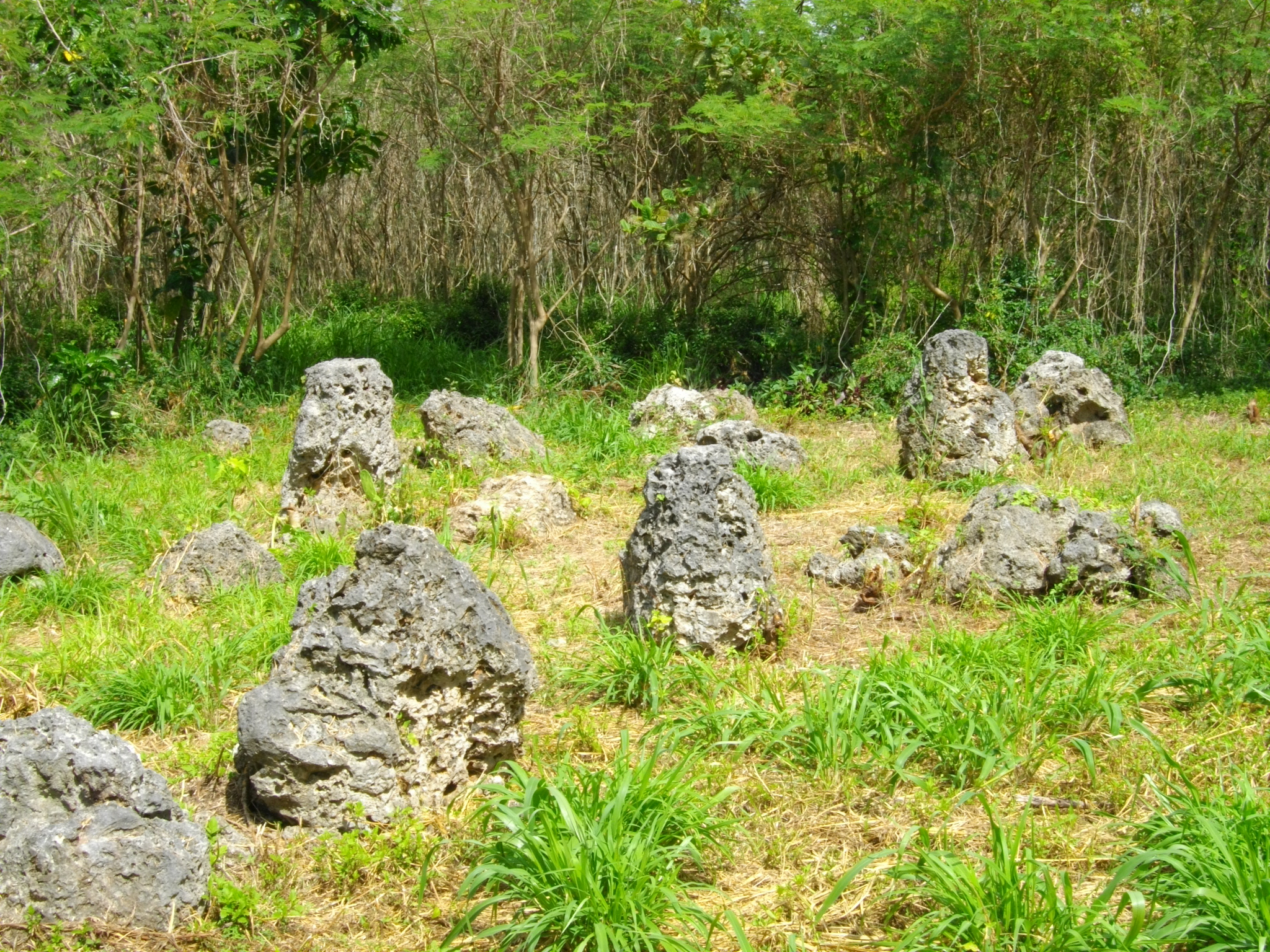

- Location within Northern Mariana Islands
- Nearest city: North Laolao Beach, Saipan, Northern Mariana Islands
- Area: less than one acre
- Built: 1670
- Architectural style: Latte sets
- NRHP reference No.: 00001212
- Added to NRHP: October 30, 2000

The Laulau Kattan Latte Site is a prehistoric archaeological site on the island of Saipan in the Northern Mariana Islands. Located near the shore of Laulau Bay, it is a small village site containing the remains of four latte stone house foundations, and an extensive scattering of pottery artifacts. When first reported by the pioneering archaeologist Alexander Spoehr in the 1940s, the latte stones were described as mostly fallen over and extremely weathered.

The site was listed on the National Register of Historic Places in 2000.

== See also ==
- National Register of Historic Places listings in the Northern Mariana Islands
