= Tachognya =

- Tachognya / Tachogña
- U.S. National Register of Historic Places
- Nearest city: San Jose, Saipan, Northern Mariana Islands
- Area: 10.2 acres (4.1 ha)
- Architectural style: Latte
- NRHP reference No.: 86000235
- Added to NRHP: February 13, 1986

Tachognya (also spelled Tachogña), also known as the Blue Site, is a prehistoric village site on the island of Saipan in the Northern Mariana Islands. It is located near the "Blue Beach" landing site of Allied forces in the Battle of Saipan, from which its name is derived. The site consists of ten latte stone house foundations, the largest of which has twelve latte columns and measures 14 by 58 feet (4.3 m × 17.7 m).

The site was listed on the United States National Register of Historic Places in 1986.

== See also ==
- National Register of Historic Places listings in the Northern Mariana Islands
