= Chudang Palii Japanese World War II Defensive Complex =

- U.S. National Register of Historic Places
- U.S. Historic district
- Nearest city: Songsong, Rota, Northern Mariana Islands
- Area: 31 acres (13 ha)
- Built: 1944
- Built by: Imperial Japanese Army
- NRHP reference No.: 12000250
- Added to NRHP: May 1, 2012

The Chudang Palii Japanese World War II Defensive Complex is one of the largest surviving World War II defensive establishments in the Northern Mariana Islands. Located at the base of a limestone bluff overlooking the island's airport, it consists of an extensive series of tunnels, walls, enclosures, gun emplacements and other features. These were built in 1944 and 1945, probably with forced labor, after the Japanese decided to embark on a program of in-depth island defenses after Allied successes against defenses that were limited to shore-based establishments. These works are characterized by an extensive use of native materials (due to a general inability to bring in outside supplies at that period in the war), and by the use of manual labor to dig tunnels, trenches, and other features.

The complex was listed on the National Register of Historic Places in 2012.

== See also ==
- National Register of Historic Places listings in the Northern Mariana Islands
