= Japanese Coastal Defense Gun =

United States historic place on Rota Island, Micronesia

- U.S. National Register of Historic Places
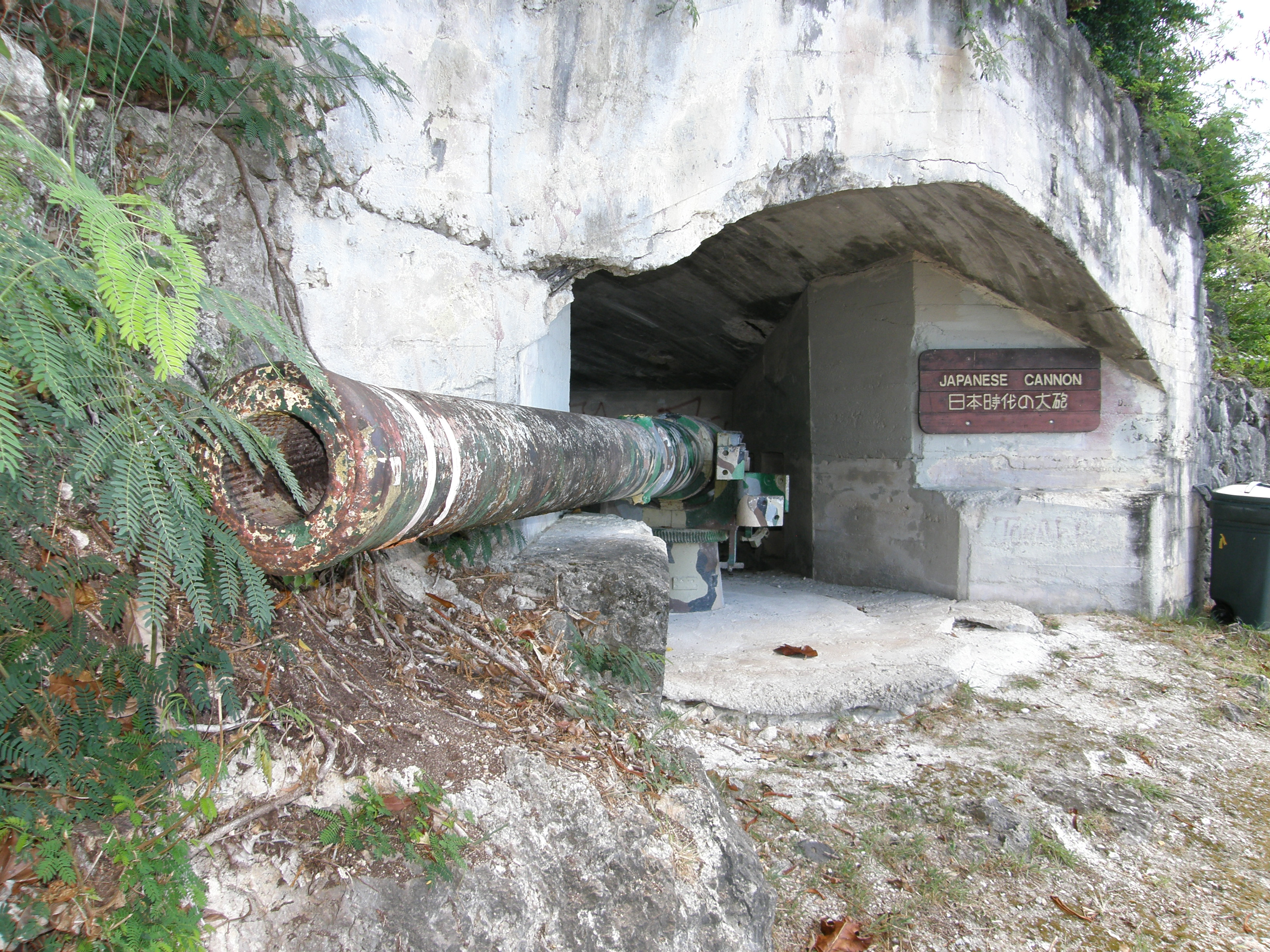

- Location within Northern Mariana Islands
- Location: East of Songsong
- Nearest city: Songsong (Rota), Northern Mariana Islands
- Coordinates: 14°7′26″N 145°10′05″E
- Area: less than one acre
- Built: 1941
- Built by: Japanese Military
- NRHP reference No.: 84000422
- Added to NRHP: November 2, 1984

The Japanese Coastal Defense Gun near Songsong on Rota in the Northern Marianas Islands, is a historic site that is listed on the U.S. National Register of Historic Places. The gun emplacement was built by the Japanese military in 1941. It was listed on the National Register in 1984.

The gun included is a Japanese 140 millimeter coastal defense gun of Model 3 type. It is placed in a camouflaged, reinforced concrete casemate within the cliff overlooking the entrance to Rota's East Harbor. Its casemate is 7.7 metres (25 ft) wide and 6.6 metres (22 ft) deep. The defense gun itself was manufactured in Japan in 1925, and is bolted into place.

== See also ==
- National Register of Historic Places listings in the Northern Mariana Islands
