= Chalan Galaide =

- U.S. National Register of Historic Places
- Nearest city: Garapan, Saipan, Northern Mariana Islands
- NRHP reference No.: 87001559
- Added to NRHP: October 4, 1987

Chalan Galaide is a late prehistoric latte stone archaeological site on the island of Saipan in the Northern Mariana Islands. It is unusual as one of the few inland latte sites in the Northern Marianas. It is a single-component site dating to the late prehistoric, or Latte Period, in the island's history. Based in part on the local name for the area and the presence of suitable tree species, it has been suggested the site was important in the production of canoes. ("galaide" means canoe in the local Chamorro language).

The site was listed on the National Register of Historic Places in 1987.

== See also ==
- National Register of Historic Places listings in the Northern Mariana Islands
