= Rectory (Rota) =

- U.S. National Register of Historic Places
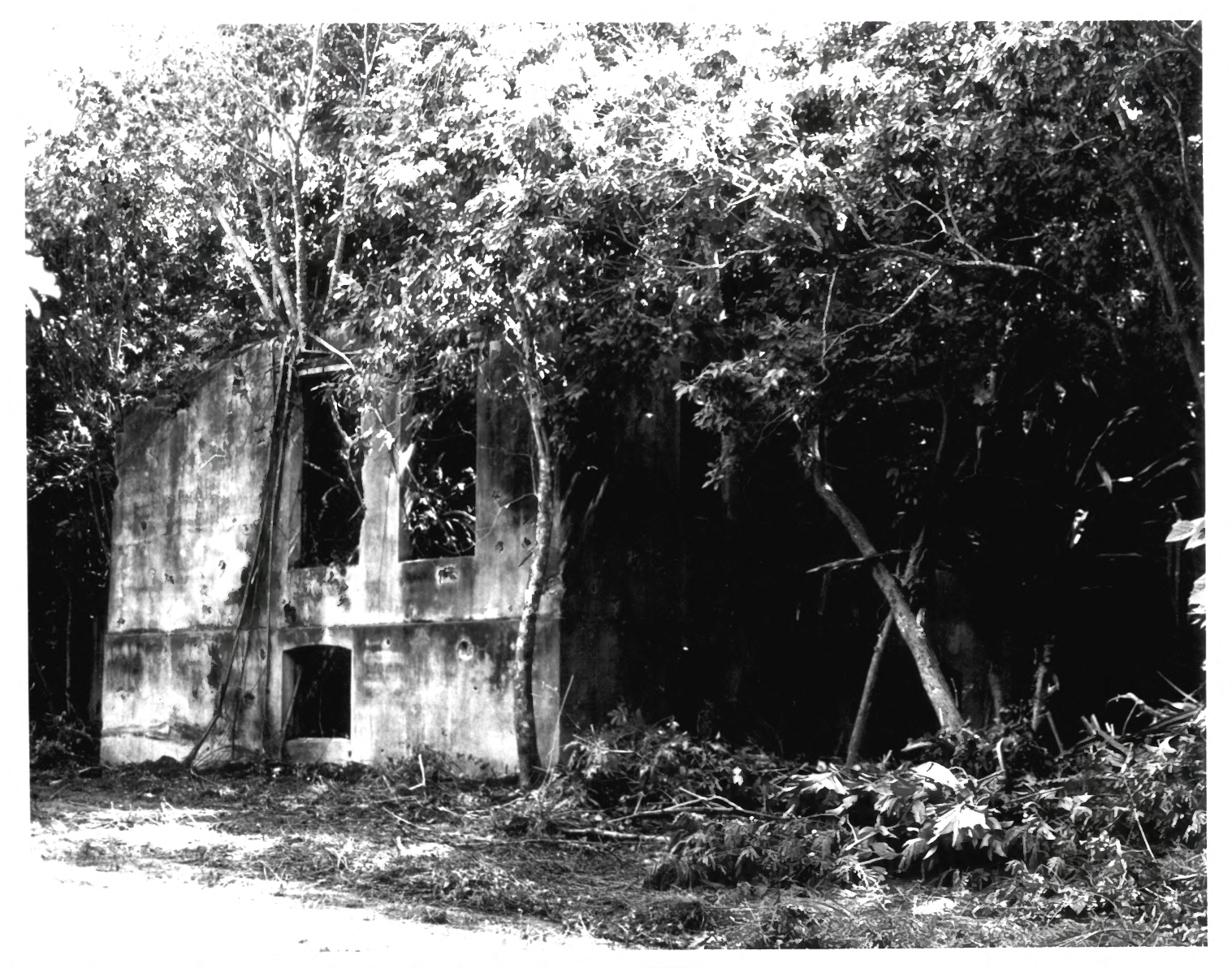

- Location within Northern Mariana Islands
- Nearest city: Songsong, Rota, Northern Mariana Islands
- Coordinates: 14°10′2″N 145°10′0″E
- Area: 1 acre (0.40 ha)
- Built: 1930
- NRHP reference No.: 81000666
- Added to NRHP: April 16, 1981

The rectory on the island of Rota in the Northern Mariana Islands is a rare example of transitional Spanish-Japanese architecture in the archipelago, now a United States commonwealth. It was built about 1930, during the South Seas Mandate period of Japanese administration, when the native Chamorro people were displaced to this area by workers imported by the Japanese to work in the sugar fields. The rectory is an L-shaped concrete structure measuring 13.7 by 19.8 metres (45 ft × 65 ft), and originally had a wood-framed second floor and roof. Although only the concrete frame remains, elements such as its massive steps and window placement are typical of the earlier Spanish period, while decorative elements such as its porch columns and window opening details are distinctly Japanese.

The structure was listed on the National Register of Historic Places in 1981.

== See also ==
- National Register of Historic Places listings in the Northern Mariana Islands
