= Nanyo Kohatsu Kabushiki Kaisha Sugar Mill =

- U.S. National Register of Historic Places
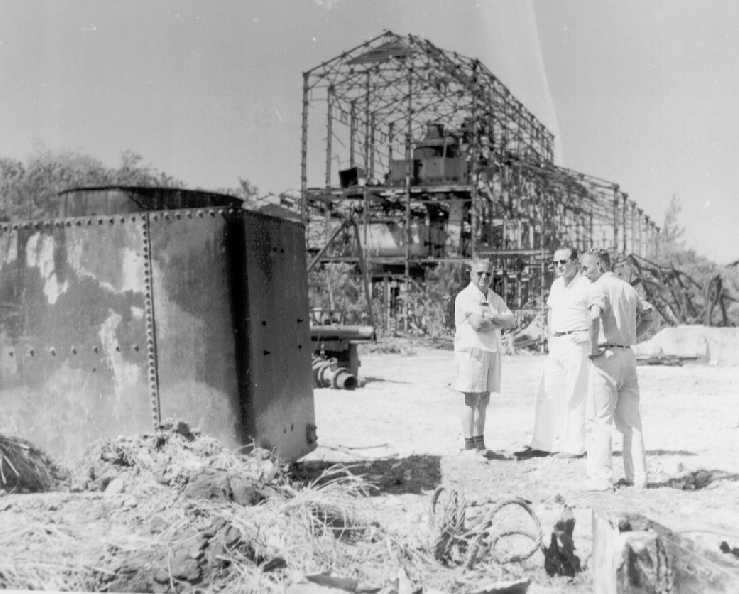

- Location within Northern Mariana Islands Location within Pacific Ocean
- Nearest city: Songsong, Rota, Northern Mariana Islands
- Coordinates: 14°8′10.5″N 145°8′7″E
- Area: less than one acre
- Built: 1930
- Built by: N.K.K., South Seas Development Co.
- NRHP reference No.: 81000665
- Added to NRHP: April 16, 1981

The Nan'yō Kōhatsu Kabushiki Kaisha Sugar Mill is a former industrial facility in the village of Songsong on the island of Rota in the Northern Mariana Islands. Its ruins are a significant reminder of the South Seas Mandate period, when Imperial Japan engaged in large-scale sugar cane farming in the Northern Marianas, and are the only brick structure in the Northern Marianas. The sugar mill on Rota was one of the major installations of the Nan'yō Kōhatsu Kabushiki Kaisha, the Japanese company responsible for economic development of the mandate area. Its executive director turned board chairman, Haruji Matsue, considered the Northern Mariana Islands the best place to establish the sugar industry, and more especially since previous Japanese commercial enterprises tried their hand at growing and processing sugar cane, but failed. The Nan'yō Kōhatsu Kabushiki Kaisha, was the most dominant economic force and being the largest Japanese Corporation, came to the Northern Marianas in 1921. Not unlike its predecessors, the NKK experienced a very tough few years, which almost forced the company to cease operations. Things started to take a turn for the better in 1926. By the early 1930s, Matsue proceeded to expand the company's landholdings and operations to Tinian and Rota, respectively. Rota had one mill and 38% of the farmlands had sugar cane growing. The remnants of this sugar mill, all that survived the Allied capture of Rota during World War II, are located on the north side of the peninsula that projects southwest from Songsong, and consist of fragments of brick and concrete structures. The most impressive single element is a brick and concrete tunnel 42.5 metres (139 ft) long, from which openings lead to the locations of other parts of the once-extensive complex.

The mill site was listed on the National Register of Historic Places in 1981.

== See also ==
- National Register of Historic Places listings in the Northern Mariana Islands
