= Unai Obyan Latte Site =

- U.S. National Register of Historic Places
- Nearest city: Chalan Kanoa, Saipan, Northern Mariana Islands
- Area: less than one acre
- Built: 1698
- NRHP reference No.: 85000244
- Added to NRHP: February 5, 1985

The Unai Obyan Latte Site is a prehistoric archaeological site on the island of Saipan in the Northern Mariana Islands. Located near Obyan Beach on the south coast of the island, it is the site of what was once a fairly extensive village, which was significantly disturbed by Japanese defensive preparations during World War II. The site includes the fragmentary remains of a single latte stone house site and a wide scattering of surface-level remains. Excavation of the latte house site in the 1940s by the pioneering archeologist Alexander Spoehr yielded evidence of a length period of occupation. The village at Obyan was documented in early Spanish accounts of the island, and was probably abandoned when the Spanish forcibly relocated the entire island population to Guam in 1698.

The site was listed on the National Register of Historic Places in 1985.

== See also ==
- National Register of Historic Places listings in the Northern Mariana Islands
