= Nanyo Kohatsu Kabushiki Kaisha complex =

- Nanyo Kohatsu Kabushiki Kaisha Administration Building
- U.S. National Register of Historic Places
- Location within Northern Mariana Islands Location within Pacific Ocean
- Location: San Jose, Northern Mariana Islands
- Coordinates: 14°58′24″N 145°37′8″E
- Area: less than one acre
- Built: 1930
- Built by: N.K.K. South Seas Development Co.
- NRHP reference No.: 81000670, 81000671, 81000672, 81000669
- Added to NRHP: April 16, 1981

The Nan'yō Kōhatsu Kabushiki Kaisha complex was the main support base of the Nan'yō Kōhatsu Kabushiki Kaisha (NKKK) on the island Tinian in the Northern Mariana Islands. The NKKK was an economic development company established by the Empire of Japan to develop the territories of the South Seas Mandate, which it oversaw between the First and Second World Wars. In the Northern Marianas, the company aggressively developed arable areas for sugar cane farming, importing workers from Japan, Okinawa, and Korea. Each of the three major islands (Tinian, Saipan, and Rota) had major support facility. On Tinian, this area, now roughly where the island's largest community, San Jose is located on the south coast, consisted of an extensive development, most of which was destroyed during the Battle of Tinian in the Second World War. Of this large complex, only four buildings or structures remain, all of which have been listed on the United States National Register of Historic Places, as rare surviving examples of pre-war Japanese architecture on the islands.

== Administration building ==
The remains of the NKKK Administration Building are on the west side of San Jose, consisting of an unpainted concrete frame whose wooden elements, including the roof, are long gone. The frame measures 9.8 metres (32 ft) wide, 14.3 metres (47 ft) long, and is about 4.5 metres (15 ft) tall. The main entrance, to the east, is identifiable by a canopy with unique fascia detailing not found on other surviving NKKK buildings in the region. When listed on the National Register in 1981, the structure was being used for storage, and its concrete was deteriorating.

== Laboratory building ==
This building is a two-story unpainted concrete structure, measuring about 5.9 by 9.2 metres (19 ft × 30 ft) with a wood-framed metal roof. Its window openings have Japanese-style concrete canopies sheltering them. It was one of the few two-story NKKK buildings, and is the only of the company's known laboratory building to survive. When listed on the National Register in 1981, it was being used as a private residence.

== Ice storage building ==
The ice storage building, the only surviving building of its type in the islands, is located just north of the House of Taga. It is a single-story unpainted concrete structure, 6 by 4.3 metres (20 ft × 14 ft) and 3.7 metres (12 ft) tall. It has a single entrance at the northwest corner, and another opening on the west side. The interior is divided into two spaces by a concrete wall, the larger space serving as the main storage area. The roof is flat tar pitch covered with concrete tiles. Two of the exterior walls have wainscoting that is a cement mortar mixed with small aggregate. The building suffered some war damage to the west wall and the interior dividing wall.

== Unknown utility building ==
One of the NKKK's surviving buildings has an unknown purpose. It is a single-story unpainted concrete structure, 3.9 by 6.5 metres (13 ft × 21 ft) and 4.5 metres (15 ft) tall. The only openings are a door and window on the north facade. Both were originally sheltered by concrete canopies, but that over the window was destroyed in the war. The original roof was also destroyed; it was apparently a gently-sloping shed roof. The building's form is distinctive among surviving NKKK buildings in the Marianas. It was listed on the National Register as a "Japanese Structure".

== See also ==
- National Register of Historic Places listings in the Northern Mariana Islands
