= Commissioner's Office (Rota) =

- U.S. National Register of Historic Places
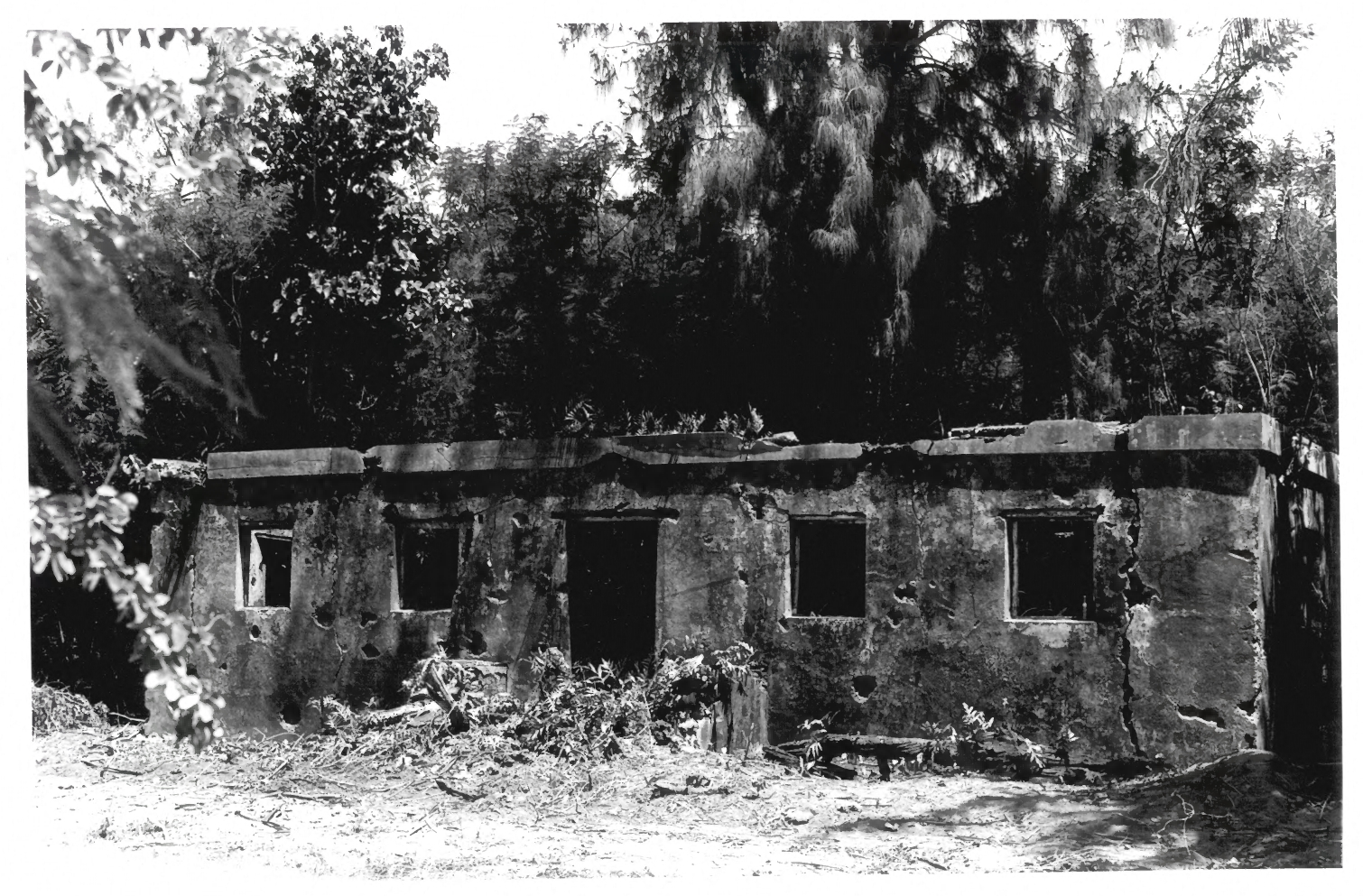

- Location within Northern Mariana Islands
- Nearest city: Songsong, Rota, Northern Mariana Islands
- Coordinates: 14°10′5″N 145°9′46″E
- Area: less than one acre
- Built: 1930
- NRHP reference No.: 81000663
- Added to NRHP: April 17, 1981

The Commissioner's Office is a rare surviving example of transitional Spanish-Japanese architecture on the island of Rota in the Northern Mariana Islands, an insular area of the United States in the western Pacific Ocean. It is a single-story structure with walls of manposteria (coral, typically mixed with limestone mortar, but in this case probably portland cement), a construction method adopted during the Spanish period. The window trim consists of ifil lintels, and the building's cornice is Japanese in style. At the time of the building's listing on the National Register of Historic Places in 1981, it was in deteriorated condition, lacking a roof and with one collapsed wall. The structure was built in the 1930s by the local Chamorro people, who had been displaced to that part of the island by Japanese settlement undertaken as part of the South Seas Mandate. The building housed the offices of a local commissioner, or village head responsible to the Japanese authorities. Many buildings built by the Japanese during the mandate period were destroyed in World War II.

== See also ==
- National Register of Historic Places listings in the Northern Mariana Islands
