= Japanese 20mm Cannon Blockhouse =

- U.S. National Register of Historic Places
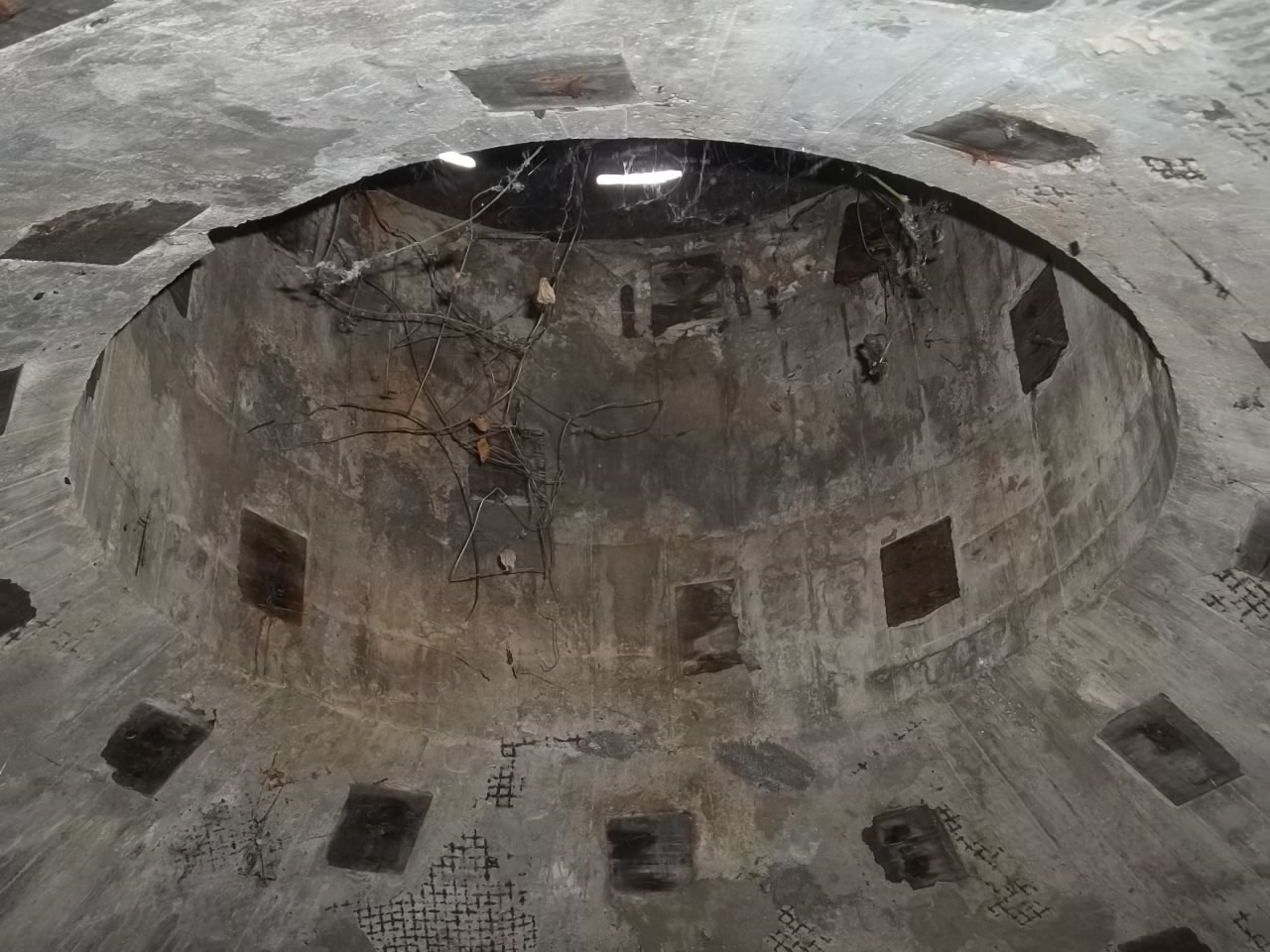

- Location within Northern Mariana Islands
- Nearest city: Saipan, Northern Mariana Islands
- Coordinates: 15°6′41″N 145°42′7″E
- Area: less than one acre
- Built: 1944
- NRHP reference No.: 95001048
- Added to NRHP: August 25, 1995

The Japanese 20mm Cannon Blockhouse is one of many relics of World War II on the island of Saipan in the Northern Mariana Islands. It is a concrete blockhouse, semi-circular in shape with a diameter of about 6 metres (20 ft). Its walls are 1.22 metres (4.0 ft) thick with four firing ports large enough to accommodate 20mm cannons, originally equipped with steel sliding shutters. A steel door 25 millimetres (0.98 in) thick provides access to the structure at the rear, sheltered by a concrete wall and covered defensively by a machine gun port. The blockhouse is located near the center of what is locally called Big Agingan Beach (Unai Dankulo Agingan), on the south coast of the island, about 20 metres (66 ft) from the shore. It was built in some haste by the Japanese forces defending Saipan in 1944, and was captured by Allied forces early in the Battle of Saipan.

The blockhouse was listed on the National Register of Historic Places in 1995.

== See also ==
- National Register of Historic Places listings in the Northern Mariana Islands
