= Hachiman Shrine (Saipan) =

- Hachiman Jinja
- U.S. National Register of Historic Places
- Location within Northern Mariana Islands
- Location: Lot nos. H 300-11 & H 300-4, Kannat Taddong Papago, Saipan, Northern Mariana Islands
- Coordinates: 15°10′48″N 145°45′40″E
- Area: 1.2 acres (0.49 ha)
- Built: 1924
- Architectural style: Japanese Shinto Shrine
- NRHP reference No.: 03000549
- Added to NRHP: June 21, 2003

The Hachiman Jinja (彩帆八幡神社) is a derelict Shinto shrine off Kagman Road on the island Saipan in the Northern Mariana Islands, and one of the few on those islands to survive relatively intact. The shrine, dedicated to the kami Hachiman, was probably built in the 1930s by the Japanese administration of the South Seas Mandate as part of a program to Japanize the large number of Ryukyuan and Korean workers on the island. The shrine survived the World War II Battle of Saipan in remarkably good condition, although its main torii fell, and two komainu (dog-like statues) were lost. The main honden received some maintenance in the 1970s, and the property has received some maintenance from a local landholder. As of 2019, it is in total disrepair.

The shrine was listed on the National Register of Historic Places in 2003.

== See also ==
- National Register of Historic Places listings in the Northern Mariana Islands
