= Chugai' Pictograph Site =

- U.S. National Register of Historic Places
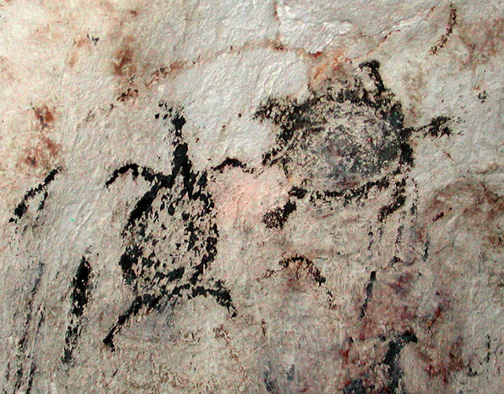
- Pictograph depicting turtles

- Location within Northern Mariana Islands
- Nearest city: Rota, Northern Mariana Islands
- Coordinates: 14°9′12″N 145°16′3″E
- Area: less than one acre
- NRHP reference No.: 98001066
- Added to NRHP: August 31, 1998

The Chugai' Pictograph Site is a prehistoric rock art site on the island of Rota in the Northern Mariana Islands. The rock art is located in a limestone cave on the southeastern side of the island, in the I'Chenchon Bird Sanctuary. It consists of a large panel, 185 feet (56 m) in length, of about 90 painted drawings, believed to be of late pre-contact origin. The site is accessed via a trail cut by the Japanese during the South Seas Mandate period.

The site was listed on the National Register of Historic Places in 1998.

== See also ==
- National Register of Historic Places listings in the Northern Mariana Islands
