= South Finegayan Latte Stone Park =

- U.S. National Register of Historic Places
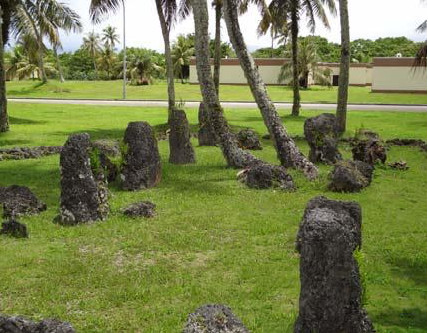

- Location within Guam
- Location: 74 Golden Shower Lane, Finegayan, Guam
- Coordinates: 13°33′11″N 144°49′35″E
- Area: 0.3 acres (0.12 ha)
- NRHP reference No.: 75002150
- Added to NRHP: September 5, 1975

The South Finegayan Latte Stone Park is a small public park and archaeological site at 74 Golden Shower Lane in Dededo, Guam. Located in the United States Navy housing area known as Finegayan, it encompasses the remains of a latte stone house site, which are the only remnants of a once-extensive Chamorro village in the area. Radiocarbon dating and other evidence place the occupation period at this site at c. 1700, and for only a relatively short period of time (about 100 years).

The site was listed on the National Register of Historic Places in 1975.

== See also ==
- National Register of Historic Places listings in Guam
