= Rota Latte Stone Quarry =

- U.S. National Register of Historic Places
- U.S. National Historic Landmark
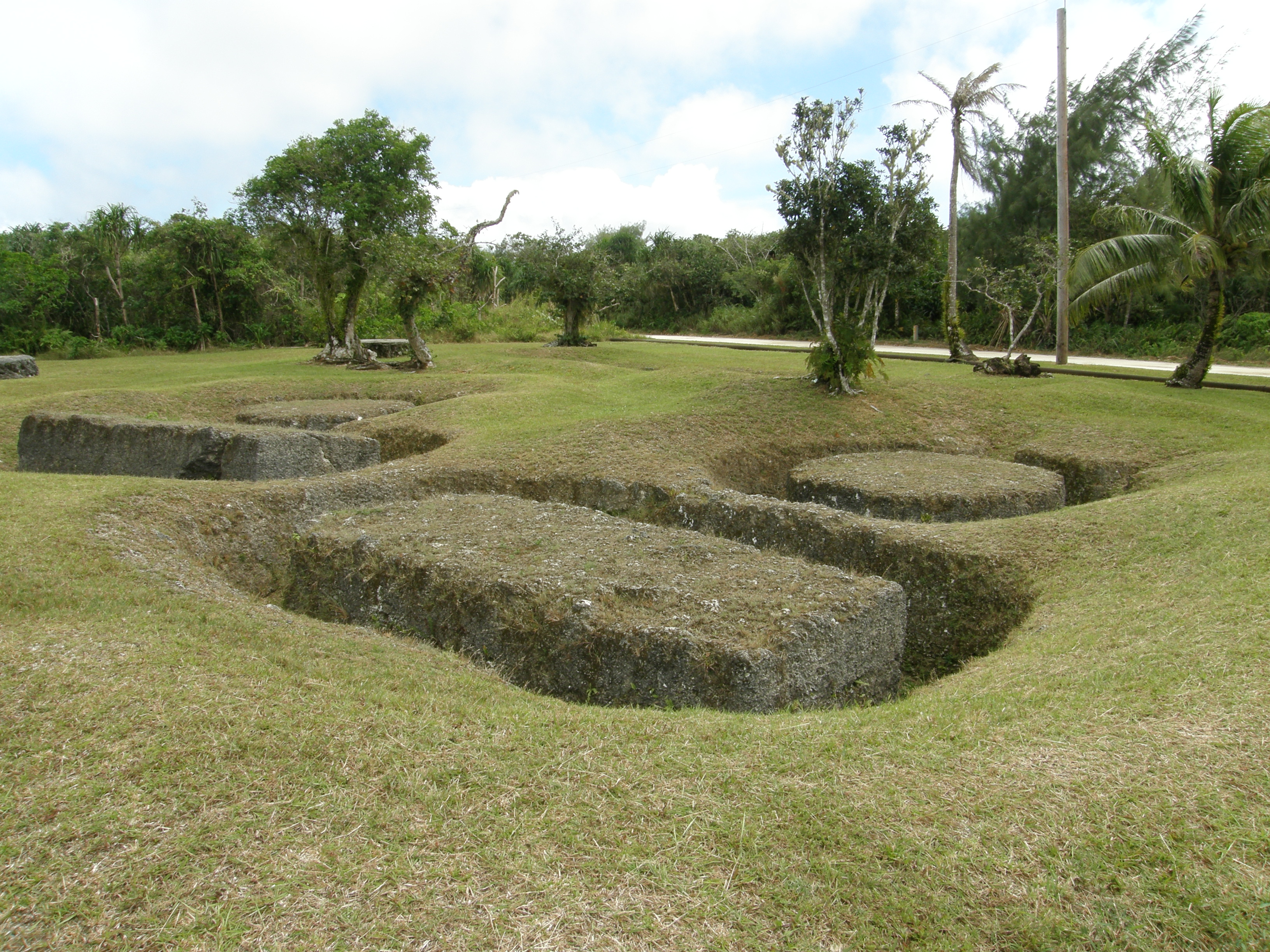
- Rota Island latte quarry site. Also called As Nieves Latte Stone Quarry

- Location within Northern Mariana Islands
- Location: Rota Island, Northern Mariana Islands
- Coordinates: 14°10′13″N 145°15′24″E
- NRHP reference No.: 74002225 (NRHP nomination); 100011371 (NHL designation)

Significant dates
- Added to NRHP: December 23, 1974
- Designated NHL: December 13, 2024

Rota Latte Stone Quarry, also known as the As Nieves quarry, is located near the Chamorro village of Sinapalo, on the island of Rota in the Marianas Archipelago. The prehistoric megaliths found there are believed to have been used as foundation pillars for houses, with some of them weighing up to 35 tons. Their exact age, origin, methods of quarrying and means of transportation have not been determined.

== Latte stones ==
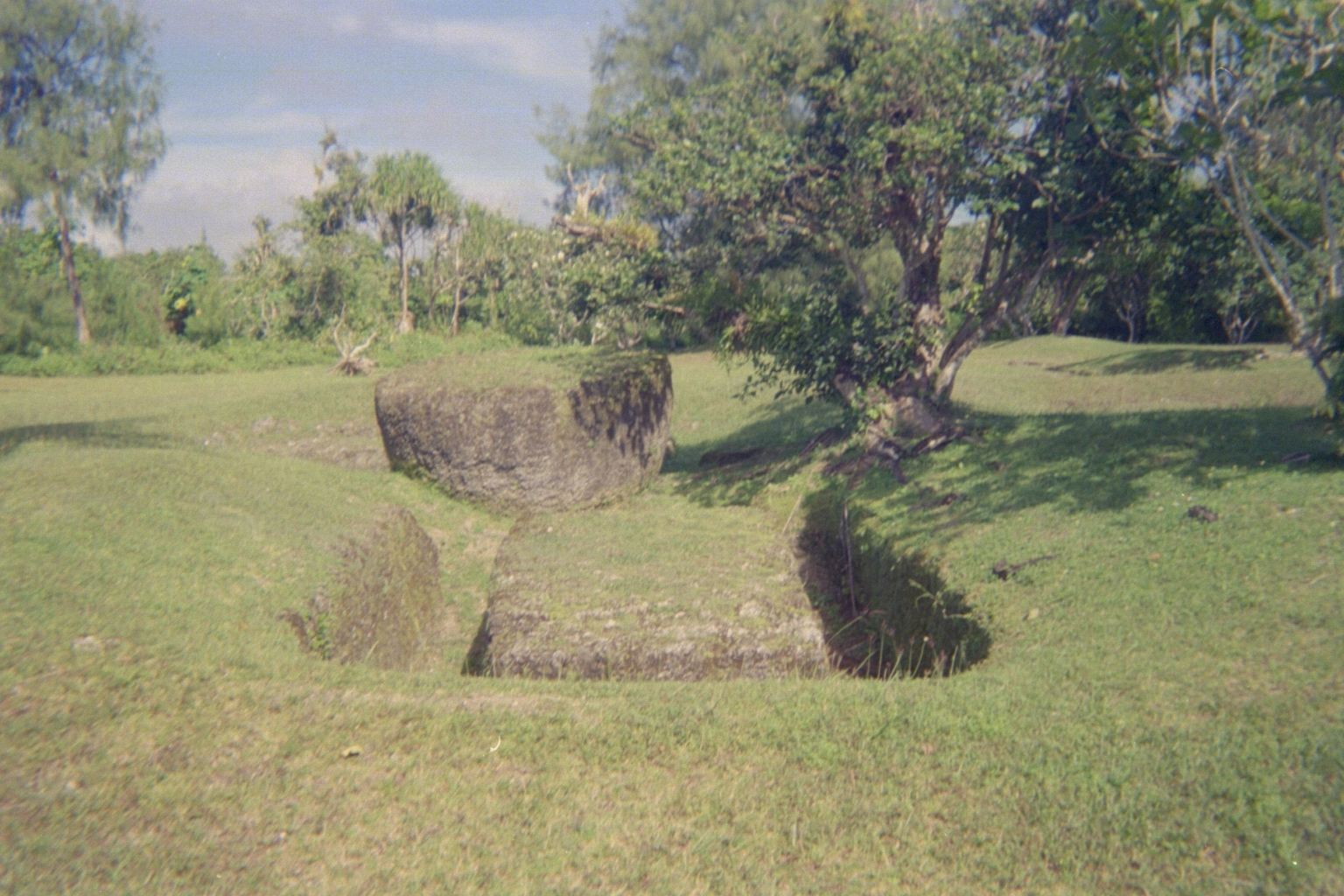
The latte quarry on Rota has several partially cut stones

A latte stone pillar (also called a taga stone) is a two-piece structure consisting of a base (haligi) and hemispherical cap (tasa), with the flat side turned upwards. It is believed that the prehistoric latte stone pillars were used as housing foundations for the indigenous culture of the Marianas. The homes sat on top of two parallel rows of the pillars, and the Chamorro, or their ancestors, buried their dead between the rows. The stones pre-date any retained oral history of the Chamorro, who cite the original source of the stones as the "taotaomona" (before time people). The exact age of the stones has not been determined, but some are believed to date back to at least 845 AD. Carbon dating places the indigenous population as far back as 3,000 BC.

== The quarry ==
The Rota quarry is the site of the largest unearthed latte stones in the Marianas. Nine haligi and seven tasa have been found there.

Some of the abandoned megaliths would stand approximately 25 feet (7.6 m) high if the haligi had been topped with tasa and erected upright. The tasa at the quarry measure approximately 7 feet (2.1 m) across and 5 feet (1.5 m) high. The stones are unfinished, and there is no record or indication of why the site was suddenly abandoned.

== Theories ==
Theories have been put forward regarding the methods of quarrying, transporting and erecting the latte stones, but nothing has been scientifically proven.

When upright, the megaliths from Rota Latte Stone Quarry would be per 0.5 m taller than the tallest existing latte stones at the House of Taga in Tinian Island. This might be indicative of competition between different groups, striving to build the most impressive sets of latte stones.

Legend credits the origin of the quarry to a mythological chief named Taga, who quarried the stones at Rota before abandoning the site and later erecting the House of Taga on Tinian. A different legend tells of ghosts carrying the stones.
