= Unai (name) =

Basque male given name

Origin
- Meaning: Cowherd and cowboy
- Region of origin: Basque

Unai is a Basque male given name, which means "cowherd". It is one of the most popular first names for boys in the Basque Country. The name may refer to:

Spanish football players

- Unai Alba (born 1978)
- Unai Albizua (born 1989)
- Unai Arieta (born 1999)
- Unai Bilbao (born 1994)
- Unai Buján (born 2001)
- Unai Bustinza (born 1992)
- Unai Dufur (born 1999)
- Unai Egiluz (born 2002)
- Unai Elgezabal (born 1993)
- Unai Emery (born 1971)
- Unai Expósito (born 1980)
- Unai García (born 1992)
- Unai Gómez (born 2003)
- Unai Hernández (born 2004)
- Unai López (born 1995)
- Unai Marino (born 1999)
- Unai Medina (born 1990)
- Unai Nuñez (born 1997)
- Unai Rementería (born 1999)
- Unai Ropero (born 2001)
- Unai Simón (born 1997)
- Unai Vencedor (born 2000)
- Unai Veiga (born 1998)
- Unai Vergara (born 1977)

Spanish cyclists

- Unai Cuadrado (born 1997)
- Unai Elorriaga (born 1980)
- Unai Iparragirre (born 1988)
- Unai Iribar (born 1999)
- Unai Osa (born 1975)
- Unai Uribarri (born 1984)
- Unai Yus (born 1974)

Other

- Unai Aguirre (born 2002), Spanish water polo player
- Unai Basurko (born 1977), Spanish sailor
- Unai Biel (born 2002), Spanish water polo player
- Unai Etxebarria (born 1972), Venezuelan road racing cyclist
- Unai Hualde (born 1976), Basque politician
- Unai Melgosa (born 1976), Spanish football manager
- Unai Mendia (born 1981), Spanish football manager
