= Japanese Jail Historic and Archeological District =

- U.S. National Register of Historic Places
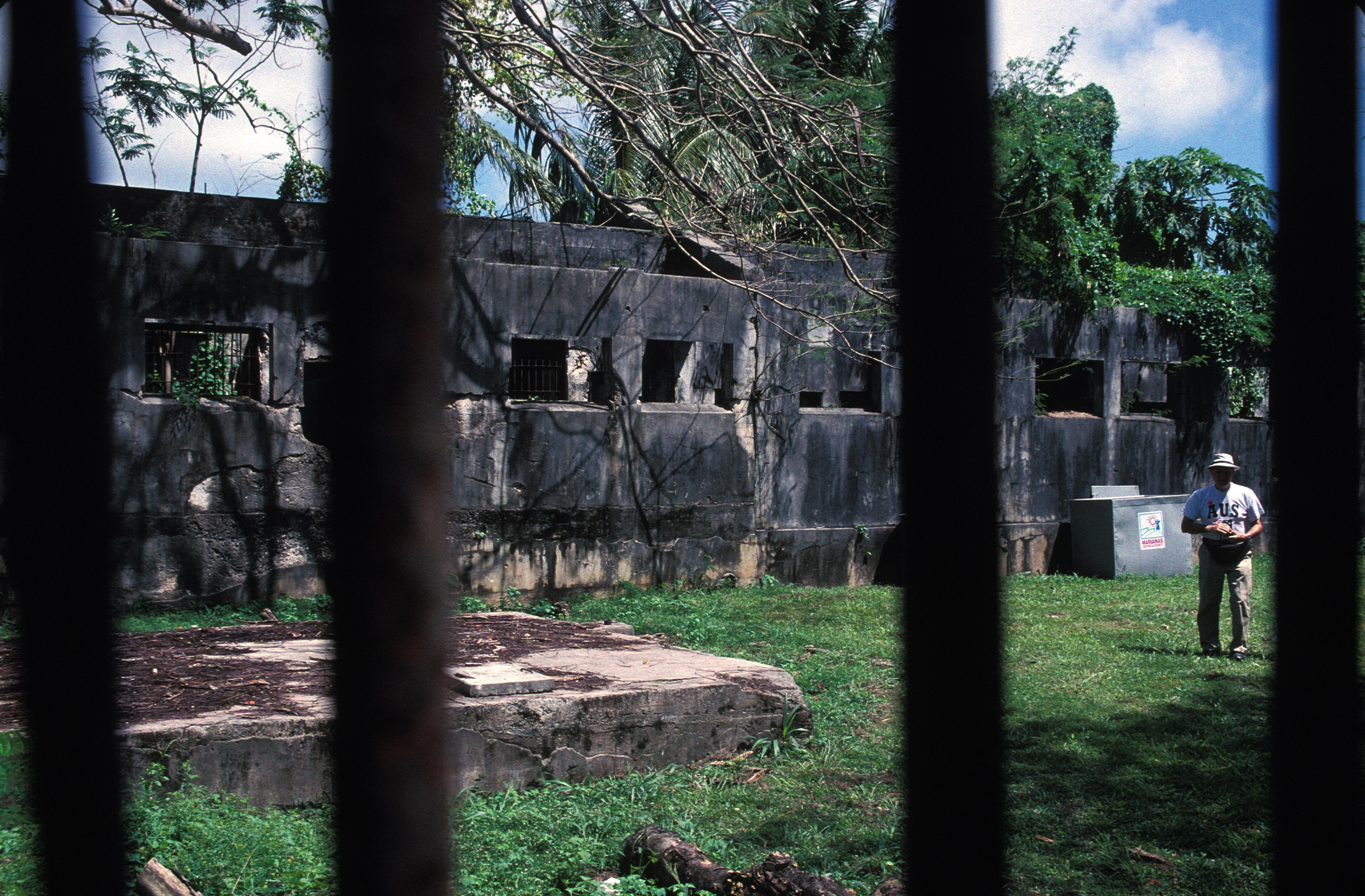

- Location within Northern Mariana Islands
- Location: Chichirica Avenue and Ghiyobw Street, Garapan (Saipan), Northern Mariana Islands
- Coordinates: 15°21′1″N 145°43′8″E
- NRHP reference No.: 10001017
- Added to NRHP: April 8, 2011

The Japanese Jail Historic and Archeological District in Garapan (Saipan), MP, is a historic district that was listed on the U.S. National Register of Historic Places in 2011. The listing included two contributing structures and 15 contributing sites. It includes ruins of a jail that was built in 1930 and was used until 1944.

== See also ==
- Japanese Hospital (Saipan), also NRHP-listed in the Northern Mariana Islands
