= Japanese Hospital (Saipan) =

- U.S. National Register of Historic Places
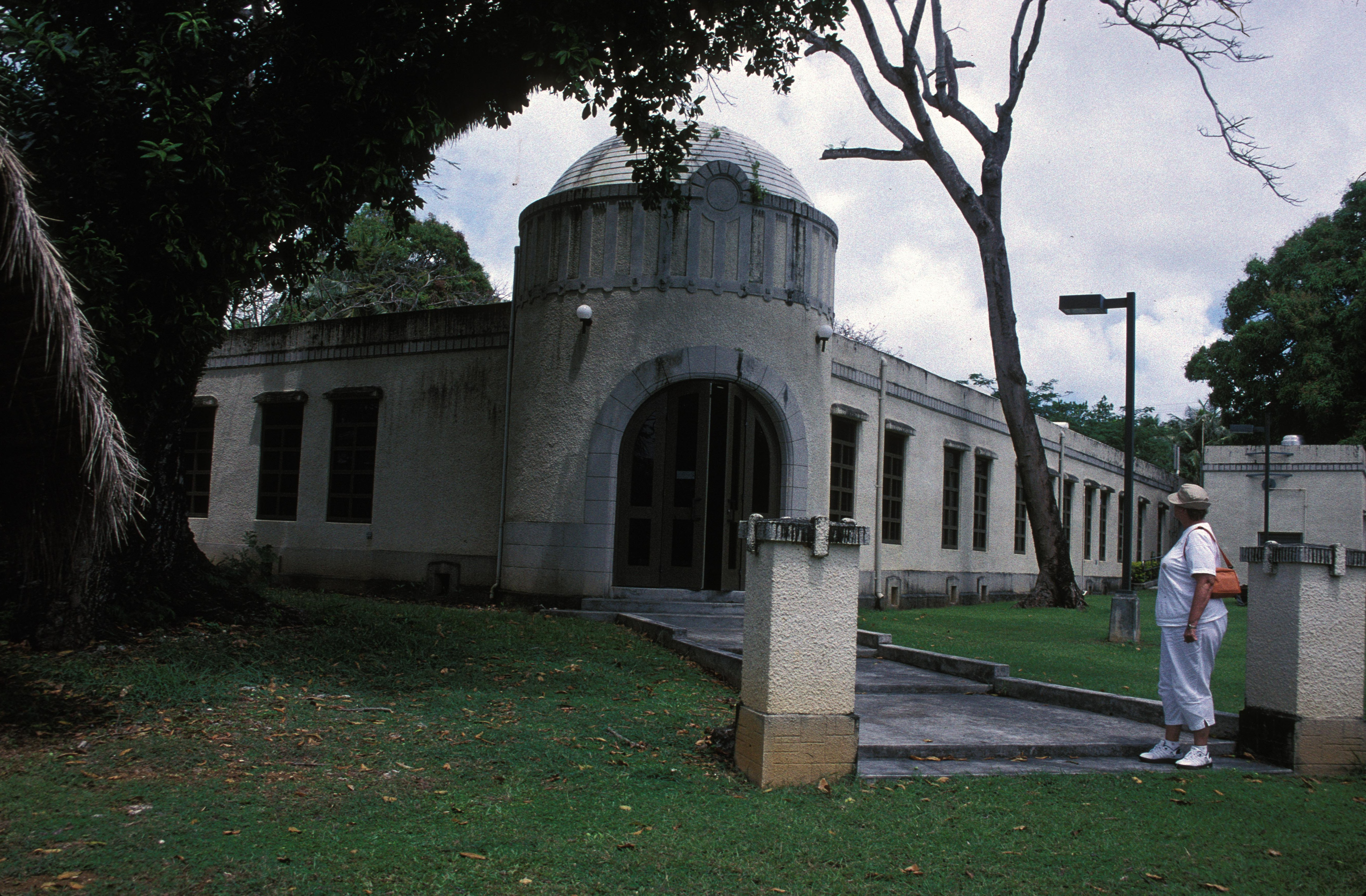

- Location within Northern Mariana Islands
- Location: Rte. 3, Garapan (Saipan), Northern Mariana Islands
- Coordinates: 15°12′6″N 145°43′8″E
- Area: 5 acres (2.0 ha)
- NRHP reference No.: 74002189
- Added to NRHP: December 19, 1974

The Japanese Hospital or Saipan Byoin is a historic World War II-era hospital complex on Route 3 in Garapan, a village on the island of Saipan in the Northern Mariana Islands. The three concrete buildings are the largest Japanese-built structures to survive the war. The main hospital building is an L-shaped structure with a domed entrance at the crook of the L. A second, smaller building housed the pharmacy, while the third is an underground circular chamber of unknown purpose. All were in deteriorating condition when surveyed in the early 1970s. The complex has since undergone restoration, and the main hospital building now houses the Northern Mariana Islands Museum.

The hospital was listed on National Register of Historic Places in 1974.

== See also ==
- Japanese Hospital (Rota), also NRHP-listed in the Northern Mariana Islands
- National Register of Historic Places listings in the Northern Mariana Islands
