= Campaneyan Kristo Rai =

Historic building on the Pacific island of Saipan

- U.S. National Register of Historic Places
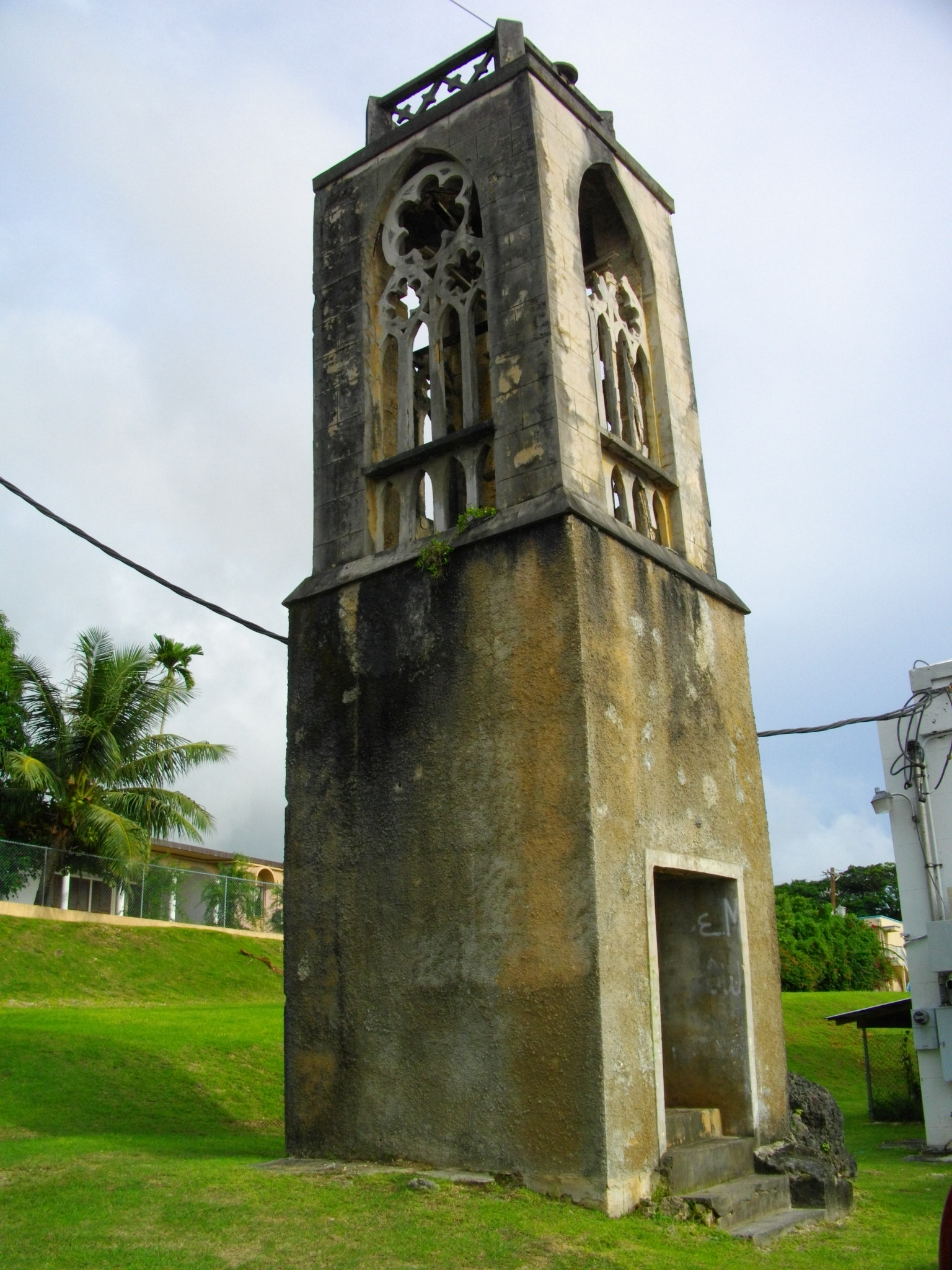

- Location within Northern Mariana Islands
- Location: Beach Rd., Garapan, Saipan, Northern Mariana Islands
- Coordinates: 15°12′5″N 145°42′55″E
- Area: less than one acre
- Built: 1932; 94 years ago
- Built by: Spanish Jesuit Order
- NRHP reference No.: 84000207
- Added to NRHP: October 30, 1984

The Campaneyan Kriso Rai, also known as the Catholic Belltower, is a historic church tower in Garapan, the largest village on Saipan island in the Northern Mariana Islands. Built in 1932, it is the only element of the island's most prominent Roman Catholic church to survive bombardment in World War II. The tower, a concrete structure 3 meters (9.8 ft) square and 10 meters (33 ft) tall, was built by Spanish Jesuits brought in by the Japanese South Seas Mandate administration, and stood next to an 1860 wood-frame church.

The tower was listed on the National Register of Historic Places in 1984.

== See also ==
- National Register of Historic Places listings in the Northern Mariana Islands
