= Japanese Hospital (Rota) =

- U.S. National Register of Historic Places
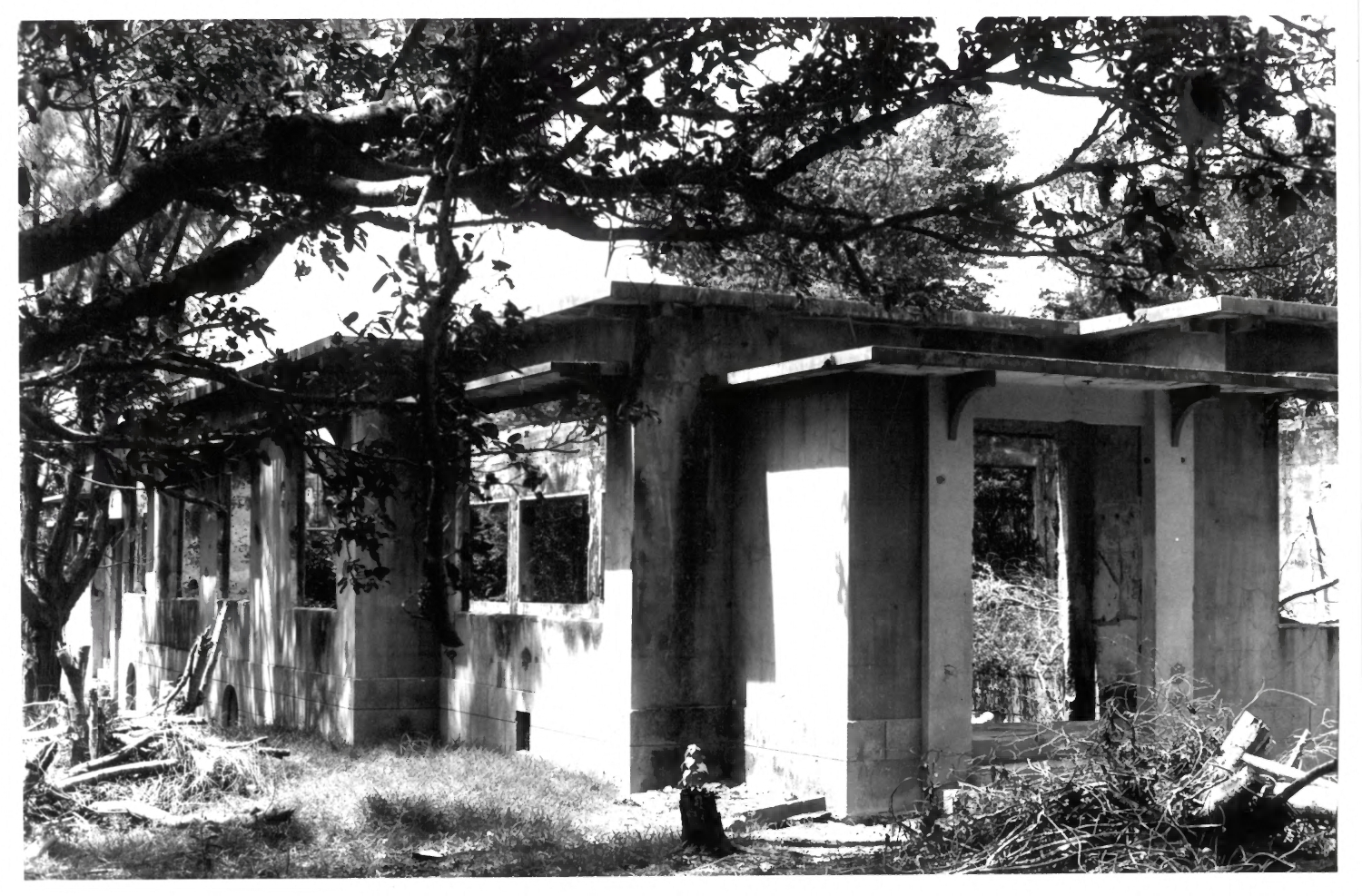

- Location within Northern Mariana Islands
- Nearest city: Songsong, Rota, Northern Mariana Islands
- Coordinates: 14°8′9″N 145°8′10″E
- Area: less than one acre
- Built: 1930
- Built by: N.K.K., South Seas Development Corp.
- NRHP reference No.: 81000664
- Added to NRHP: April 16, 1981

The former Japanese Hospital building on the island of Rota in the Northern Mariana Islands is one of the few remaining Japanese-era buildings on the island. It is a single-story L-shaped concrete structure. When listed on the National Register of Historic Places in 1981, it was described as being in derelict condition, being little more than the concrete structure, lacking a roof, windows, and most of its woodwork. The window openings are sheltered by typical Japanese concrete canopies. The building was built by the Japanese about 1930, during the South Seas Mandate period; most Japanese-built structures on Rota were destroyed during World War II.

== See also ==
- National Register of Historic Places listings in the Northern Mariana Islands
