= Waherak Maihar =

- Waherak MAIHAR
- U.S. National Register of Historic Places
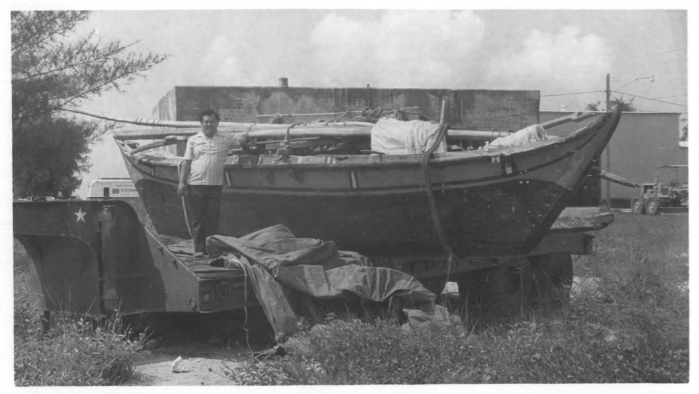

- Location within Northern Mariana Islands
- Nearest city: Chalan Kanoa, Saipan, Northern Mariana Islands
- Area: 0 acres (0 ha)
- Built: 1958
- NRHP reference No.: 78003081
- Added to NRHP: January 31, 1978

The Waherak Maihar is a historic outrigger canoe on the island of Saipan in the Northern Mariana Islands. Built in 1958, it is a well-preserved example of a traditional Caroline Islands ocean-going canoe. It is 26 feet (7.9 m) long with a beam of 3 feet (0.91 m). It was constructed by the islanders of Poluwat from native materials, including coconut, pandanus, and breadfruit.

The canoe was listed on the National Register of Historic Places in 1978. It was deemed historically significant despite its young age due to the extreme fragility of these types of vessels, whose life span rarely exceeds twenty years. This canoe is deemed particularly significant as it was donated by the Poluwat islanders for use in the 1976 Operation Sail, marking the United States Bicentennial. When recorded in 1978, it was in storage in Saipan's main public works compound.

== See also ==
- National Register of Historic Places listings in the Northern Mariana Islands
