= Unai Lagua Japanese Defense Pillbox =

- U.S. National Register of Historic Places
- U.S. National Historic Landmark District – Contributing property
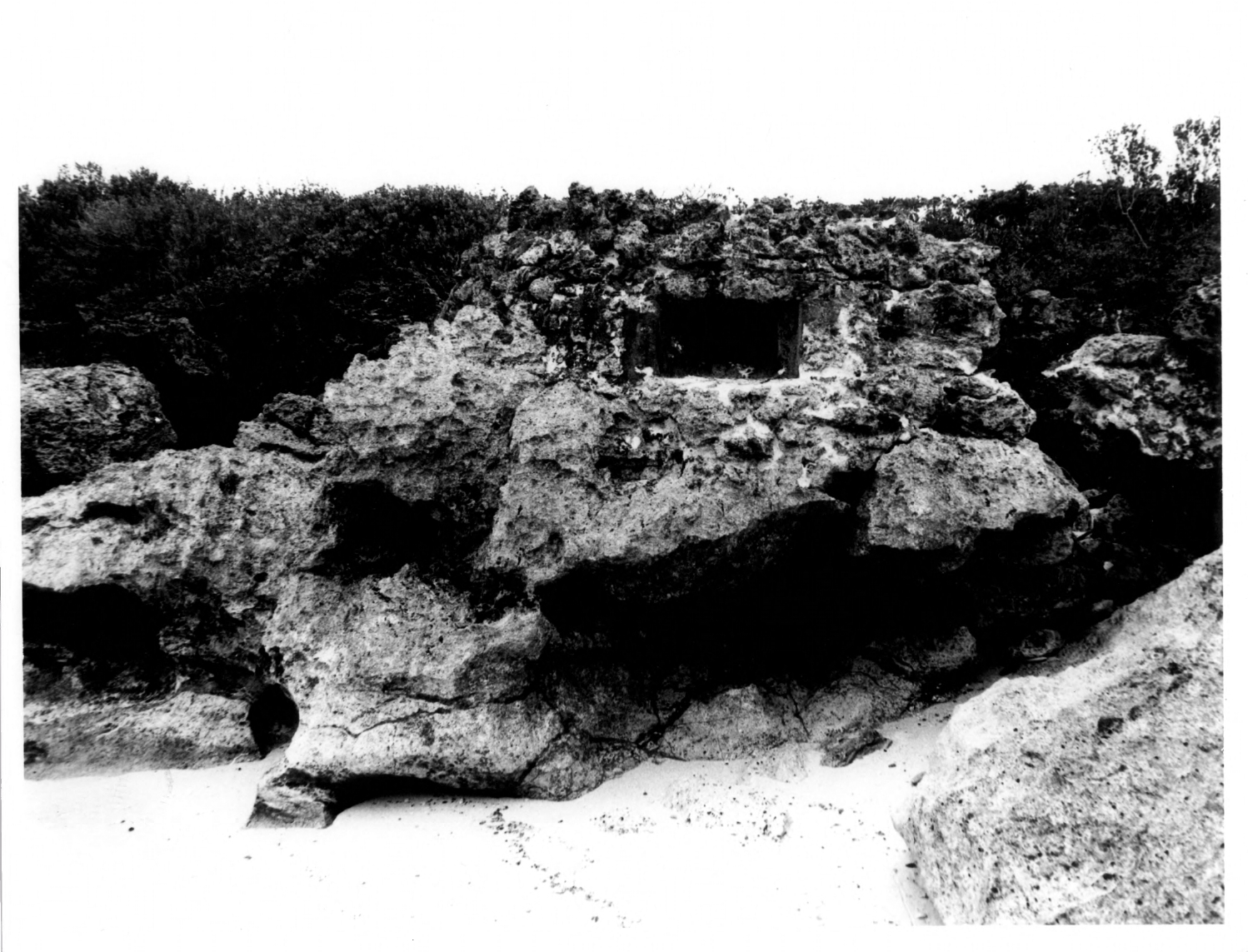
- Nearest city: San Roque, Saipan, Northern Mariana Islands
- Coordinates: 15°16′20″N 145°49′33″E
- Area: 0.2 acres (0.081 ha)
- Built: 1943
- Part of: Landing Beaches; Aslito/Isley Field; & Marpi Point, Saipan Island (ID85001789)
- NRHP reference No.: 84002777

Significant dates
- Added to NRHP: June 1, 1984
- Designated NHLDCP: February 4, 1985

The Unai Lagua Japanese Defense Pillbox is one of the more unusual surviving World War II-era Japanese fortifications on the island of Saipan in the Northern Mariana Islands. It is located at the southern end of Unai Lagua (Parrot Fish Beach), which stretches along the northern shore of the island. The pillbox is fashioned out of poured concrete and coral boulders, and uses natural rock formations as part of its walls. This construction was necessitated by a severe shortage of building materials on the island as the Japanese prepared the island's defenses against the advancing Allied forces in 1943–44. The use of natural materials and terrain had the added benefit of rendering the position nearly invisible to aerial or offshore observation.

The pillbox was listed on the National Register of Historic Places in 1985; it is also a contributing element to the "Landing Beaches; Aslito/Isley Field; & Marpi Point, Saipan Island", a National Historic Landmark District encompassing surviving World War II military infrastructure on Saipan.

== See also ==
- National Register of Historic Places listings in the Northern Mariana Islands
