= Unai Dangkulo Petroglyph Site =

- U.S. National Register of Historic Places
- Nearest city: Unai Dangkulo, Tinian, Northern Mariana Islands
- Area: less than one acre
- NRHP reference No.: 99001270
- Added to NRHP: October 27, 1999

The Unai Dangkulo Petroglyph Site is one of a small number of documented rock art sites in the Mariana Islands. Located on the northeastern shore of the island of Tinian in the Northern Marianas, it is the only such site composed exclusively of pictographs (that is, carved or pecked figures rather than painted ones). It is also uncommon in that it is not found in a cave-like setting, which is where most of the other rock art sites in the region are found. The site is on a limestone outcrop that is sometimes covered by sand or cleared of sand by typhoons, and was discovered in 1998 after it was exposed by Typhoon Keith. It consists of about 50 figures, many of them anthropomorphic.

The site was listed on the United States National Register of Historic Places in 1999.

== See also ==
- National Register of Historic Places listings in the Northern Mariana Islands
