= Unai Iparragirre =

Spanish cyclist

Personal information
- Full name: Unai Iparragirre Azpiazu
- Born: 25 July 1988 (age 38) Azpeitia, Spain

Cycling career
- Sport: Cycling
- Current team: Retired
- Disciplines: Road; Track
- Role: Rider

Amateur teams
- 2007–2008: Belca
- 2009–2012: Bidelan–Kirolgi

Professional teams
- 2013: Euskadi
- 2014: Start–Trigon Cycling Team

Unai Iparragirre Azpiazu (born 25 July 1988) is a Basque former professional road bicycle racer. He was born in Azpeitia, Basque Country, and turned professional with Euskadi Fundazioa in 2013. He also competed in track cycling.

== Major results ==
2011
2nd Madison, National Track Championships (with Unai Elorriaga)
2013
3rd Overall Tour of China II
