= Unai Achugao Archaeological Site =

- U.S. National Register of Historic Places
- Nearest city: Punton Achugao (Achugao Point), Saipan, Northern Mariana Islands
- Area: less than one acre
- Built: 3470BCE
- NRHP reference No.: 96000825
- Added to NRHP: August 8, 1996

The Unai Achugao Archaeological Site is a major archaeological site on the island of Saipan in the Northern Mariana Islands. This site is one of the first sites at which reliable radiocarbon dates were acquired for the early habitation of the island, which were dated to about 3500 BCE. Excavations at the site also yielded more than 3,000 pottery fragments, which were used in the early classification of pottery types in the region. The site also included a nearly-intact habitation surface which was protected by a fossilized coral reef.

The site was listed on the National Register of Historic Places in 1996.

== See also ==
- National Register of Historic Places listings in the Northern Mariana Islands
