= House of Taga =

- U.S. National Register of Historic Places
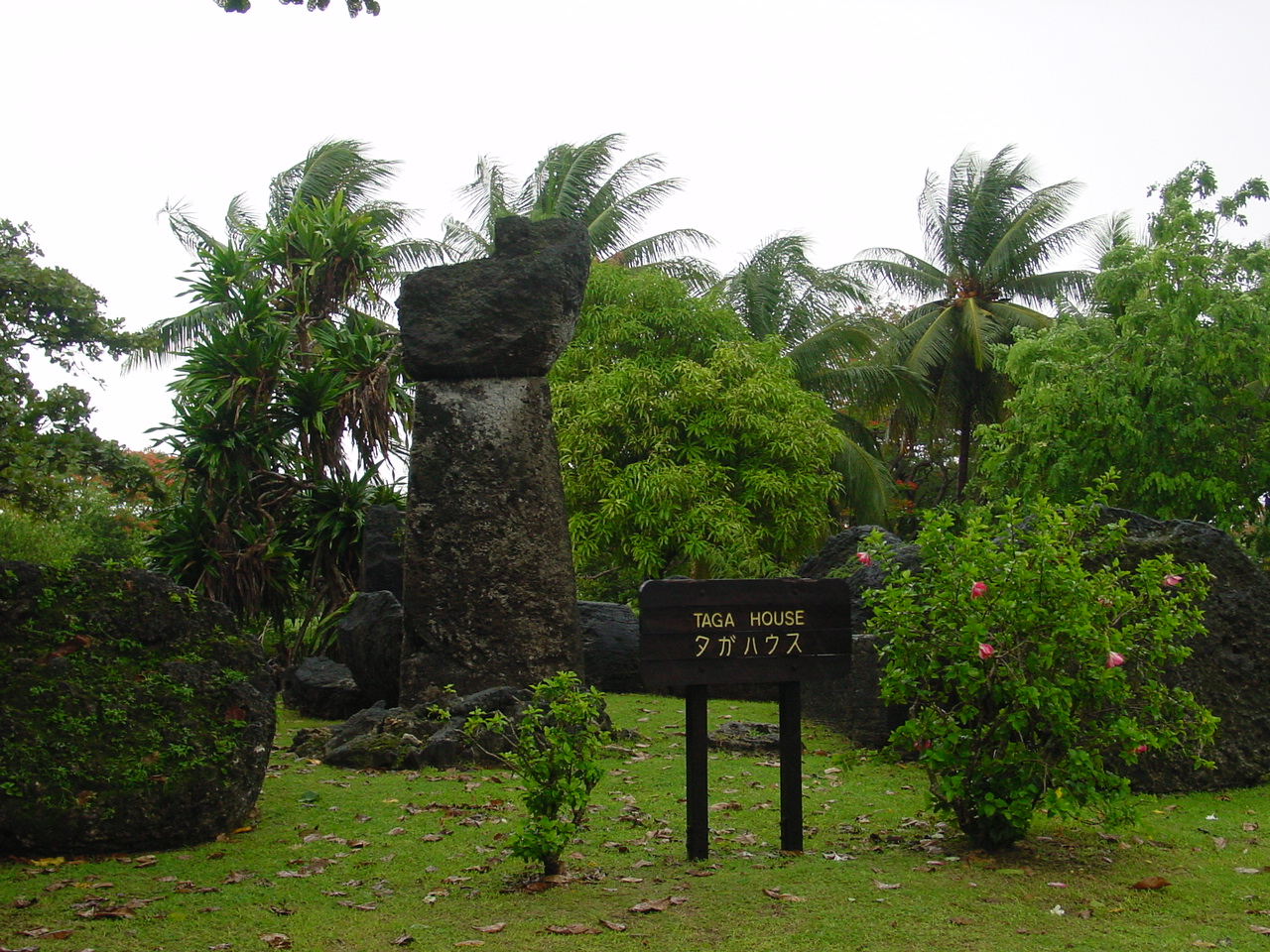
- Latte stones at House of Taga

- Location within Northern Mariana Islands
- Location: Tinian Island, Northern Mariana Islands
- Coordinates: 14°57′56″N 145°37′11″E
- NRHP reference No.: 74002193
- Added to NRHP: December 19, 1974

The House of Taga (Chamoru: Guma Taga) is an archeological site located near San Jose Village, on the island of Tinian, United States Commonwealth of the Northern Mariana Islands, in the Marianas Archipelago. The site is the location of a series of prehistoric latte stone pillars which were quarried about 4,000 feet (1,200 m) south of the site, only one of which is left standing erect due to past earthquakes. The name is derived from a mythological chief named Taga, who is said to have erected the pillars as a foundation for his own house.

== The structures ==
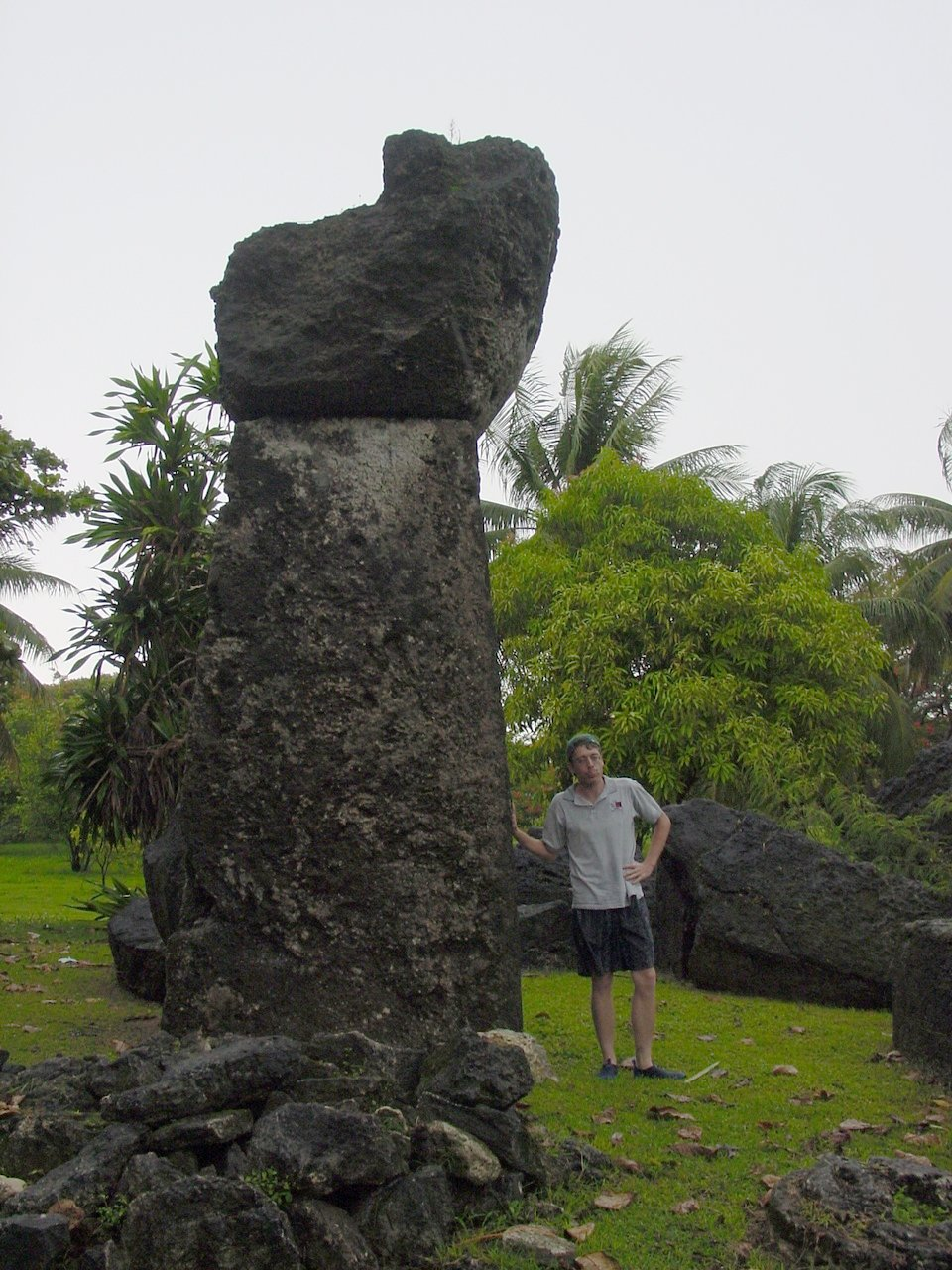
Man standing next to largest known erected latte stone, at House of Taga

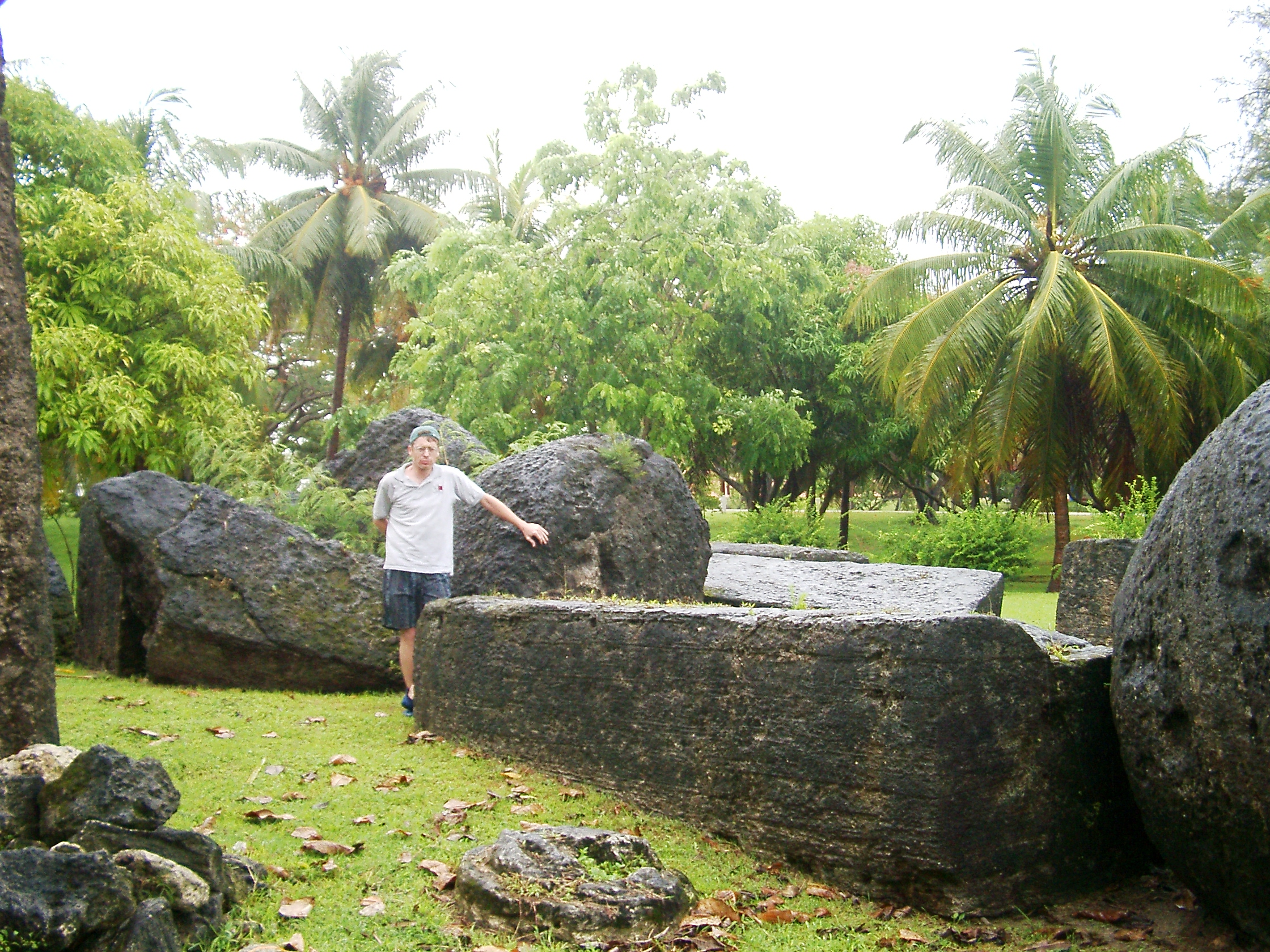
Fallen stones at House of Taga

The prehistoric latte stone pillars (also called taga stones) at House of Taga stood 15 feet (4.6 m) high, and were quarried about 4,000 feet (1,200 m) south of the site. The original megaliths consisted of a base (haligi) and a hemispherical cap (tasa). When uprighted in spaced parallel rows, it is believed a house was built on top. Of the twelve upright stones sketched by British explorer George Anson during his 1742 visit to Tinian, only one remains standing. The As Nieves Rota Latte Stone Quarry is believed to be the Marianas origin of the period of these megalith structures.

== Legend of Chief Taga and his house ==
=== Alexander Spoehr ===
In his 1957 published work Marianas Prehistory: Survey and Excavations on Saipan, Tinian and Rota, anthropologist Alexander Spoehr noted that the House of Taga had most likely been the central latte structure among eighteen such structures on Tinian. According to legend collected by Spoehr, a 10 feet (3.0 m) tall Guam chief named Taga married a Rota woman. The chief began the Rota Latte Stone Quarry to carve stone for their home. Midway through, he changed his mind and instead built the house on Tinian.

=== Variation ===
One variation on that story also puts Taga's origins at Guam. As a child, he began demonstrating such super-human strength that his own father was jealous and tried to kill him. Taga escaped from his father by jumping off a cliff on Guam and landing on Rota, almost 50 miles (80 km) away. On Rota, Taga grew to adulthood and became a braggart about his prowess. According to the legend, it was Taga who began the As Nieves Quarry on Rota and abandoned it for reasons that are unclear.

Taga married and had a family, and they sailed to Tinian. His reputation had preceded him, and the chief of Tinian presented several challenges to test Taga's strength. The chief was subsequently so impressed with Taga's abilities that he named Taga the chief of the island. Taga carved the latte stones to single-handedly build his Tinian house and a village for his people. He carried the multi-ton pillars all by himself. As the years passed, while on a trip to Saipan, Taga's wife gave birth to a son that Taga bragged about to no end. Taga's brother tired of all the bragging and challenged Taga to a contest, which ended in a draw between the two brothers. This was the end of Taga's bragging.

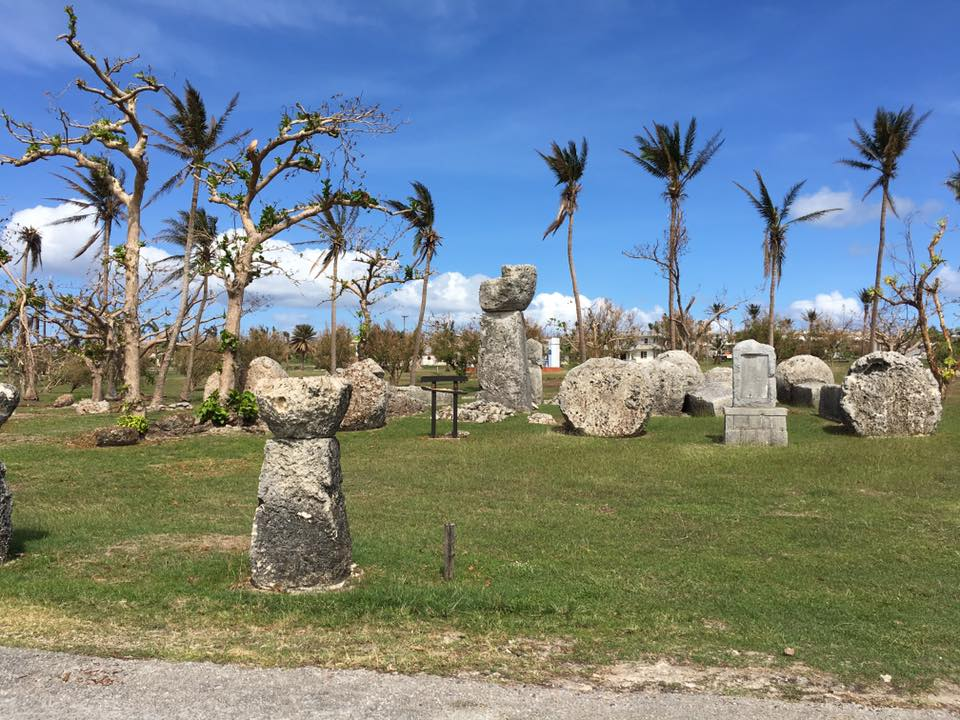
House of Taga with most vegetation damaged or removed due to Typhoon Yutu

Eventually, Taga and his wife were the parents of twelve children. When Taga realized that his youngest son had greater strength than he, Taga flew into a jealous rage and murdered his son. Taga's wife died of grief. His youngest daughter then speared Taga to death and died of a broken heart. As each of Taga's twelve children died, their spirits inhabited the latte stones of his house. Each spirit was released by the individual latte stone falling to the ground. The lone standing megalith today is said to imprison the spirit of the daughter who murdered Taga.
