= Dr. Rita Hocog Inos Jr./Sr. High School =

Location
- Songsong, Rota, Northern Mariana Islands; 14°08′07″N 145°08′12″E

Information
- Type: Public Secondary
- School district: CNMI Public School System
- Website: cnmipss.org/school/dr-rita-hocog-inos-jr-sr-high-school/

Dr. Rita Hocog Inos Jr./Sr. High School (RHI), formerly Rota Jr./Sr. High School, is a secondary school in Songsong on the island of Rota in the Northern Mariana Islands, and a part of the CNMI Public School System. It is the island's sole secondary school.

The mascot is the Buck.

== History ==
Rota Jr./Sr. High School was formed in 2006 by the consolidation of Rota High School and Rota Junior High School.

Rota Elementary/Junior & High School previously served Rota. Rota High School separated from the K-12 school, and had its first class graduate in June 1974 and in 1983 moved from the former Rota Elementary School facility to a new facility.
