= Unai Sahu =

The Unai Sahu or sahu are a Baniya sub-caste found in the state of Uttar Pradesh in India. They get their name from the town of Unnao District in Uttar Pradesh, and Unai literally means someone from Unnao.The community consist of two endogamous sub-groups, the Unai proper and the Unawa. They are distinct from Teli. They speak the Awadhi and Bhojpuri dialects, and are Hindus. The Unai Sahu are found mainly in the Eastern region (Purvanchal Region) of Uttar Pradesh Ayodhya, Varanasi, Gorakhpur, Lucknow and Deoria.

They derive their name Sahu, or sometimes pronounced Sao and Sah, from their ancestral family business of bankers and money lending: from the Hindi word Sahukar, meaning, in a sense, persons dealing with money. Sahus also have traditional business of oilseeds and oil milling. With the passage of time, they have spread to many parts of India, particularly eastern India.

They bear different surnames in different regions and states of India such as Sahu/Sahoo, Bilsora, Nigam, Shah, Shaw/Saw, Prasad, Gupta, Rathore, Vaniyar, Saha, Gorai, Agarwal, Sadhu-Khan, Das, Kubara/Kubera, Talakar, Lingayat, Gandla, kula, Modi, Devathilakula, Sahu, Rathod, Ganiga, Bahaldia, Sethi (Punjabi speaking). People from these community are peace lover, business minded, helpful and religious. Most of the population is in Madhya Pradesh, Chhattisgarh, Uttar Pradesh, Orissa, Bihar and Rajasthan states of India.
