= Sinapalo, Rota =

Sinapalo
- Village
- Location within Northern Mariana Islands
- Coordinates: 14°9′56.16″N 145°13′50.88″E
- Country: Northern Mariana Islands
- Island: Rota

Population (2012)
  - Total: 1,297

Sinapalo or Sinapalu is a village on the island of Rota in the Northern Mariana Islands. The village is the largest settlement on the island (followed by Songsong in the southwest), located south of the island's airport, Rota International Airport, close to the center of the island.

== Demographics ==
According to the Saipan Tribune, Sinapalo had a population of 1,297 in 2012, making up just over half of the island of Rota's population of 2,527.

== Education ==
Commonwealth of the Northern Mariana Islands Public School System

- Sinapalo Elementary School is in Sinapalo
  - Previously Rota Elementary & Junior High School in Songsong had elementary classes. Sinapalo Elementary was built in two phases, with the Rota government and Rota Resort Hotel financing it. In 1995 phase I was built. There was a four-year hiatus in the construction that ended when the Rota government allowed it to continue. The school opened in February 2002 when phase II was built.
- Dr. Rita Hocog Inos Jr./Sr. High School in Songsong serves Sinapalo

== Climate ==
Climate data for Rota Airport (1991–2020 normals, extremes 1993–present)
Month	Jan	Feb	Mar	Apr	May	Jun	Jul	Aug	Sep	Oct	Nov	Dec	Year
Record high °F (°C)	89 (32)	89 (32)	89 (32)	89 (32)	90 (32)	94 (34)	91 (33)	91 (33)	96 (36)	90 (32)	90 (32)	89 (32)	96 (36)
Mean daily maximum °F (°C)	83.6 (28.7)	83.5 (28.6)	84.3 (29.1)	85.1 (29.5)	86.3 (30.2)	87.1 (30.6)	86.7 (30.4)	85.9 (29.9)	86.1 (30.1)	86.1 (30.1)	85.8 (29.9)	84.8 (29.3)	85.4 (29.7)
Daily mean °F (°C)	78.9 (26.1)	78.6 (25.9)	79.3 (26.3)	80.1 (26.7)	81.2 (27.3)	81.8 (27.7)	81.2 (27.3)	80.5 (26.9)	80.6 (27.0)	80.8 (27.1)	80.8 (27.1)	80.2 (26.8)	80.3 (26.8)
Mean daily minimum °F (°C)	74.2 (23.4)	73.7 (23.2)	74.2 (23.4)	75.1 (23.9)	76.0 (24.4)	76.6 (24.8)	75.7 (24.3)	75.2 (24.0)	75.1 (23.9)	75.5 (24.2)	75.9 (24.4)	75.5 (24.2)	75.2 (24.0)
Record low °F (°C)	63 (17)	61 (16)	64 (18)	69 (21)	66 (19)	65 (18)	57 (14)	64 (18)	64 (18)	63 (17)	69 (21)	67 (19)	57 (14)
Average precipitation inches (mm)	5.66 (144)	4.76 (121)	3.45 (88)	3.65 (93)	3.73 (95)	5.41 (137)	9.86 (250)	14.15 (359)	15.04 (382)	13.88 (353)	7.49 (190)	5.35 (136)	92.43 (2,348)
Average precipitation days (≥ 0.01 in)	19.4	16.8	15.5	17.2	18.4	20.2	25.3	24.4	25.2	25.3	22.8	20.7	251.2
Source: NOAA
