= Alexander Spoehr =

American anthropologist (1913–1992)

- Born: August 23, 1913; Tucson, Arizona, USA
- Died: June 11, 1992 (aged 78); Honolulu, Hawaii, USA
- Occupation: Anthropologist

Alexander Spoehr (August 23, 1913 – June 11, 1992) was an American anthropologist who served as president of the American Anthropological Association in 1965.

Spoehr was born in Tucson, Arizona on August 23, 1913, to parents Herman Augustus Spoehr and Florence Mann. Alexander Spoehr was of German, Danish, and Austrian descent. He was raised in Palo Alto, California, and enrolled at Stanford University, later transferring to the University of Chicago, where he completed an A. B. in economics. Spoehr remained at the University of Chicago for graduate study in anthropology, researching the Seminole in Florida. In January 1940, Spoehr began working at the Field Museum. He served in the U.S. Marine Corps Reserve and the U.S. Army Corps of Engineers during World War II, and later joined the Naval Reserve. Spoehr returned to the Field Museum in 1946. He left Chicago for Honolulu in 1953, and worked for the Bishop Museum until 1962. Spoehr had been named leader of the East–West Center in 1961, and served from 1962 until his resignation in 1963 to teach at the University of Pittsburgh. He left Pitt in 1978, and moved to Hawaii. He died at the age of 78 on June 11, 1992, in Honolulu.

In 1947, Spoehr photographed a little girl named Mojina Jinuna Mote on Majuo Atoll in the Marshall Islands. At the time he did not record her name. In 2019, when the Field Museum invited Marshallese expatriates to contribute to an exhibit focused on their homeland, one contributor, Terry Mote, identified the young girl as his mother who had since relocated to Oklahoma. Both the 1947 photograph and a new portrait of Mojina Jinuna Mote were included in the exhibit.
