= Latte stone =

Historical building supports

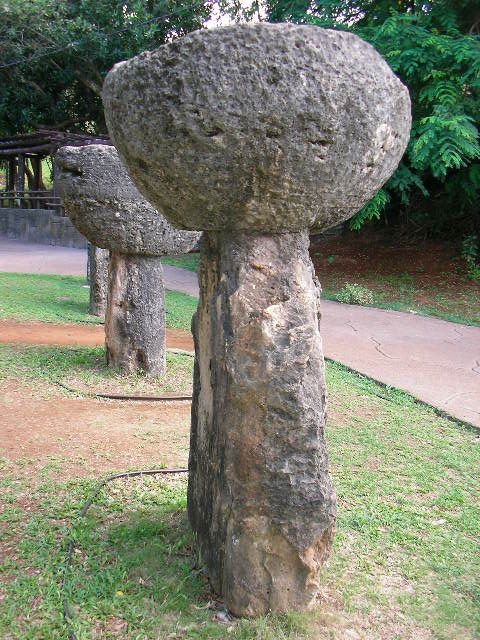
A latte stone in Latte Stone Park, Hagåtña, Guam

A latte stone, or simply latte (also latde, latti, or latdi), is a pillar (Chamorro language: haligi) capped by a hemispherical stone capital (tasa) with the flat side facing up. Used as building supports by the ancient Chamorro people, they are found throughout most of the Mariana Islands. In modern times, the latte stone is seen as a sign of Chamorro identity and is used in many different contexts.

== Construction ==
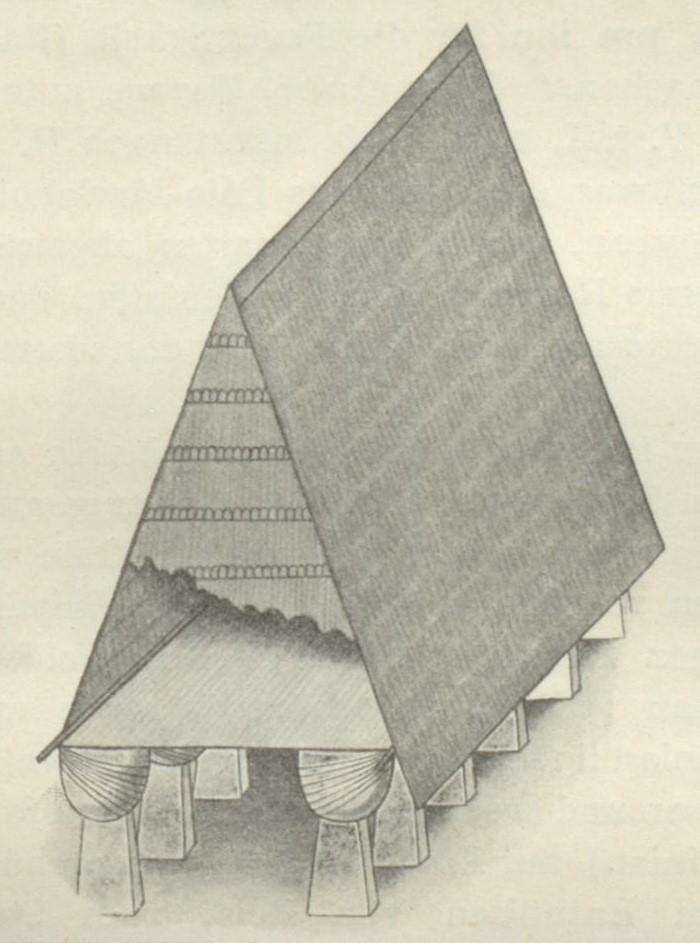
Reconstruction of latte stone structure

Latte stones have been made of limestone, basalt, or sandstone. Typical pillars range in height from 60 centimeters to three meters, and generally narrow towards the top. The pillar was normally quarried and then transported to the construction site. For small to medium-sized lattes, the capstone was a large hemispherical coral head that was gathered from a reef. The massive capstones found in Rota were instead quarried, like the pillars.

In Oceania the latte stone is unique to the Marianas, though megaliths of differing construction and purpose are common to Oceanic cultures. Similarities between the latte stone and the wood posts made by the Ifugao people in the Philippines, on which they build rice stores, have been pointed out. The rounded capstones help prevent rats from climbing up the pillar. A similar wood post construction appears to be depicted in a relief carving at Borobodur, Java, which has caused one scholar to put forward the disputed theory of a prehistorical cultural exchange between the Marianas and Java.

Latte stones varied greatly in size. The smallest were several feet tall. The largest latte still standing is 16 feet (5m) tall, located on Tinian at the House of Taga. In Rota, quarried latte would have stood 25 feet (8m) high if erected. The largest shaft found here weighs 34 tons while the largest cap weighs 22 tons.

== Use ==
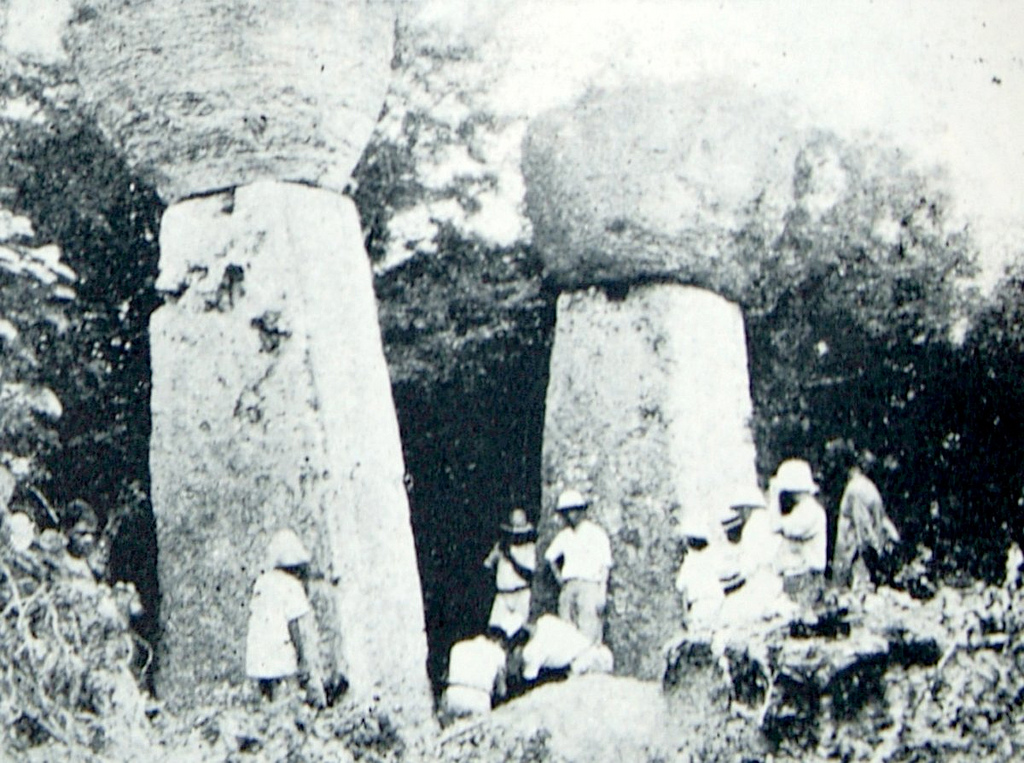
The House of Taga on Tinian, 1902

The history of the pre-contact Marianas is usually divided into three periods: Pre-Latte, Transitional Pre-Latte, and Latte. Latte stones began to be used in about 900 A.D. and became increasingly more common until the arrival of Ferdinand Magellan in 1521 and Spanish colonization, when they fell rapidly out of use and were entirely abandoned by about 1700. Latte stones have been found on Guam and the southern islands in the Commonwealth of the Northern Mariana Islands, including Rota, Tinian, Aguijan, and Saipan, as well as several small northern islands, such as Pagan.

Undisturbed stones are found usually arranged in parallel pairs of between eight and fourteen lattes framing a rectangular space. The more pairs in the structure, the taller the latte stones. One twenty latte arrangement was found in the current location of the military Ordnance Annex on southern Guam. While none of the early European visitors to the islands appear to have drawn pictures of latte stones in use, several Spanish accounts from the 16th and 17th centuries state that houses were erected on the stones, with one eyewitness specifying that the structures on lattes were used to shelter proas and served as community meeting places. However, the lack of definitive, consistent evidence means that all theories are disputed. Some archaeologists believe that only high status Chamorros lived in structures built on latte stones, while others have put forward the theory that all Chamorros in the Latte Period lived in latte structures, and that the height and number of the stones in the structure indicated social status. Other structures in a latte village, which may have included cooking huts, canoe houses and public houses for unmarried men, were built on the ground, typically in an A-frame of wood poles, often bamboo, with thatched roofs of grass, coconut fronds or nipa fronds.

== Cultural context ==
The Flag of the Northern Mariana Islands centers on a latte

Archaeologists who have worked in the Marianas since the end of World War II have noted a distinct difference between latte stones located along the coast and those located inland. Coastal latte tend to be placed in sand containing extensive relics of habitation, including shards of pottery, fish and animal bones, and stone and shell tools. Human burials were placed within sand containing these archaeological remnants, either within or near sets of lattes. In contrast, the soil in which inland latte stones are placed rarely has an archaeological stratum or associated burial. The implication is that mainland latte sites were temporarily occupied, and perhaps that there was a change in burial practice in the later Latte Period.

By the 18th and 19th centuries, travelers to the Marianas noted lattes only in abandoned areas, where they had apparently been left after foreign-introduced disease had decimated the Chamorro population. In modern times, latte stones are a symbol of Chamorro identity and are found in a wide variety of government, business and personal contexts. Concrete lattes are sometimes incorporated into new buildings, while residents of the Marianas will sometimes incorporate actual latte stones into the landscaping around their homes.

A latte stone features on the US quarter coins for both Guam and the Northern Mariana Islands. Highway shields marking Northern Mariana Islands highways superimpose the route number on a white outline of a latte stone.

== See also ==
- History of Guam
- Latte Stone Park
- South Finegayan Latte Stone Park
- Rota Latte Stone Quarry
- Northern Marianas Islands
