= Songsong, Rota =

Songsong
- Village
- Location within Northern Mariana Islands
- Coordinates: 14°08′26″N 145°08′30″E
- Territory: Northern Mariana Islands

Songsong is the second largest village on the island of Rota, Northern Mariana Islands, United States. As of 2000, its population is 593. Songsong is located along the southern coast, in a narrow peninsula. The village's most recognizable landmark is Mt. Taipingot, more commonly known as Wedding Cake Mountain because of its resemblance to a layered wedding cake. The word songsong is a Chamorro word meaning "village, people." The village itself is subdivided into several districts:

- District 1
- District 2
- District 3
- District 4
- Annex F
- Liyo'
- Teneto Village

== Education ==
Commonwealth of the Northern Mariana Islands Public School System

- Sinapalo Elementary School in Sinapalo serves Songsong
- Dr. Rita Hocog Inos Jr./Sr. High School is in Songsong

Previously Rota Elementary/Junior & High School and Rota Elementary & Junior High School (after Rota High School separated) were in Songsong. In February 2002 the elementary school separated and took a campus in Sinapalo.

Antonio C. Atalig Memorial Rota Public Library of the State Library of the Commonwealth of the Northern Mariana Islands is in Songsong. The current library was built circa 2002 but it did not open until its "soft" opening on February 26, 2012. It was named after Mayor of Rota Antonio C. Atalig. It adopted its current name in 1981.

== See also ==
List of reduplicated place names
