= Political party strength in the Northern Mariana Islands =

Politics in the US territory

The following table indicates the party of elected officials in the United States insular area of the Northern Mariana Islands:

- Governor
- Lieutenant Governor
- Attorney General (first elected in 2014).
- Resident Representative in Washington, D.C. (through 2008); non-voting delegate to the United States House of Representatives (beginning 2009)

The table also indicates the historical party composition in the:

- Territorial Senate
- Territorial House of Representatives

The parties are as follows: Covenant (C), Democratic (D), Independent (I), Republican/Territorial (R)/(T), Reform (Ref), Vacant (V), and a tie or coalition within a group of elected officials.

Year	Executive offices			Commonwealth Legislature		U.S. House
Year	Governor	Lieutenant Governor	Attorney General	Senate	House	U.S. House
1978	Carlos Camacho (D)	Francisco Ada (D)	appointed	5T, (Note: Territorial Party (T) is the predecessor of the CNMI Republican Party.) 4D	8T, 6D	Edward Pangelinan (D)
1979	Carlos Camacho (D)	Francisco Ada (D)	appointed	5T, 4D	8T, 6D	Edward Pangelinan (D)
1980	Carlos Camacho (D)	Francisco Ada (D)	appointed	T majority	D majority	Edward Pangelinan (D)
1981	Carlos Camacho (D)	Francisco Ada (D)	appointed	T majority	D majority	Edward Pangelinan (D)
1982	Pedro Tenorio (R)	Pedro Agulto; Tenorio (R)	appointed	R majority	R majority	Edward Pangelinan (D)
1983	Pedro Tenorio (R)	Pedro Agulto; Tenorio (R)	appointed	R majority	R majority	Edward Pangelinan (R)
1984	Pedro Tenorio (R)	Pedro Agulto; Tenorio (R)	appointed	R majority	D majority	Froilan Tenorio (D)
1985	Pedro Tenorio (R)	Pedro Agulto; Tenorio (R)	appointed	R majority	D majority	Froilan Tenorio (D)
1986	Pedro Tenorio (R)	Pedro Agulto; Tenorio (R)	appointed	[?]	R majority	Froilan Tenorio (D)
1987	Pedro Tenorio (R)	Pedro Agulto; Tenorio (R)	appointed	[?]	R majority	Froilan Tenorio (D)
1988	Pedro Tenorio (R)	Pedro Agulto; Tenorio (R)	appointed	R majority	D majority	Froilan Tenorio (D)
1989	Pedro Tenorio (R)	Pedro Agulto; Tenorio (R)	appointed	R majority	D majority	Froilan Tenorio (D)
1990	Lorenzo I. De Leon; Guerrero (R)	Benjamin Manglona (R)	appointed	D majority	R majority	Juan Babauta (R)
1991	Lorenzo I. De Leon; Guerrero (R)	Benjamin Manglona (R)	appointed	D majority	R majority	Juan Babauta (R)
1992	Lorenzo I. De Leon; Guerrero (R)	Benjamin Manglona (R)	appointed	R majority	10R, 6D, 2I	Juan Babauta (R)
1993	Lorenzo I. De Leon; Guerrero (R)	Benjamin Manglona (R)	appointed	R majority	10R, 6D, 2I	Juan Babauta (R)
1994	Froilan Tenorio (D)	Jesus Borja (D)	appointed	R majority	R majority	Juan Babauta (R)
1995	Froilan Tenorio (D)	Jesus Borja (D)	appointed	R majority	R majority	Juan Babauta (R)
1996	Froilan Tenorio (D)	Jesus Borja (D)	appointed	R majority	R majority	Juan Babauta (R)
1997	Froilan Tenorio (D)	Jesus Borja (D)	appointed	R majority	R majority	Juan Babauta (R)
1998	Pedro Tenorio (R)	Jesus Sablan (R)	appointed	8R, 1D	13R, 5D	Juan Babauta (R)
1999	Pedro Tenorio (R)	Jesus Sablan (R)	appointed	8R, 1D	13R, 5D	Juan Babauta (R)
2000	Pedro Tenorio (R)	Jesus Sablan (R)	appointed	6R, 2D, 1Ref	11R, 6D, 1I	Juan Babauta (R)
2001	Pedro Tenorio (R)	Jesus Sablan (R)	appointed	6R, 2D, 1Ref	11R, 6D, 1I	Juan Babauta (R)
2002	Juan Babauta (R)	Diego Benavente (R)	appointed	5R, 3D, 1C (Note: Reform dissolved and merged into the Democratic Party, announced June 2002)	16R, 1D, 1C	Pedro Agulto Tenorio (R)
2003	Juan Babauta (R)	Diego Benavente (R)	appointed	5R, 3D, 1C	16R, 1D, 1C	Pedro Agulto Tenorio (R)
2004	Juan Babauta (R)	Diego Benavente (R)	appointed	3C, 2D, 2R, 2I	9C, 7R, 1D, 1I	Pedro Agulto Tenorio (R)
2005	Juan Babauta (R)	Diego Benavente (R)	appointed	3C, 2D, 2R, 2I	9C, 7R, 1D, 1I	Pedro Agulto Tenorio (R)
2006	Benigno Fitial (C)	Timothy; Villagomez (C) (Note: Resigned 26 April 2009.)	appointed	3C, 3R, 2D, 1I (Note: The majority coalition consisted of senators from the Covenant Party, the Democratic Party, and the independent.)	7C, 7R, 2D, 2I	Pedro Agulto Tenorio (R)
2007	Benigno Fitial (C)	Timothy; Villagomez (C)	appointed	3C, 3R, 2D, 1I	7C, 7R, 2D, 2I	Pedro Agulto Tenorio (R)
2008	Benigno Fitial (C)	Timothy; Villagomez (C)	appointed	3C, 3R, 2D, 1I	12R, 4C, 3I, 1D	Pedro Agulto Tenorio (R)
2009	Benigno Fitial (C)	Eloy Inos (C) (Note: Nominated by Governor and confirmed by Senate to fill vacancy.)	appointed	3C, 3R, 2D, 1I	12R, 4C, 3I, 1D	Gregorio Sablan (I)
2010	Benigno Fitial (C)	Eloy Inos (C)	appointed	5R, 4I	9R, 7C, 4I	Gregorio Sablan (I)
2011	Benigno Fitial (R) (Note: Fitial founded the Covenant Party in 2001 after leaving the Republican Party. He rejoined the Republican Party on January 5, 2011, announcing that his goal will be to merger the Covenant Party back into the Republican Party.) (Note: Resigned 20 February 2013.)	Eloy Inos (C)	appointed	5R, 4I	9R, 7C, 4I	Gregorio Sablan (I)
2012	Benigno Fitial (R)	Eloy Inos (C)	appointed	5R, 4I	9R, 7C, 4I	Gregorio Sablan (I)
2013	Eloy Inos (C) (Note: Succeeded to office upon the resignation of his predecessor.)	Jude Hofschneider (R)	appointed	5R, 4I	12I, 4R, 4C	Gregorio Sablan (I)
2014	Eloy Inos (R) (Note: Inos left the Covenant Party in September 2013 and joined the Republican party.) (Note: Died in office.)	Jude Hofschneider (R)	appointed	5R, 3I, 1V (Note: Ray Naraja Yumul resigned to run with Juan Nekai Babauta as his lieutenant governor in the 2014 Northern Mariana Islands general election)	12I, 4R, 4C	Gregorio Sablan (I)
2015	Eloy Inos (R)	Ralph Torres (R)	Edward Manibusan (D) (Note: This office is elected on a nonpartisan basis, but the officeholder publicly identifies with a political party.)	7R, 2I	13I, 7R	Gregorio Sablan (I)
2016	Ralph Torres (R) (Note: Succeeded to the office upon the death of his predecessor.)	Victor Hocog (R)	Edward Manibusan (D)	6R, 3I	13I, 7R	Gregorio Sablan (I)
2017	Ralph Torres (R)	Victor Hocog (R)	Edward Manibusan (D)	7R, 2I	15R, 5I	Gregorio Sablan (I)
2018	Ralph Torres (R)	Victor Hocog (R)	Edward Manibusan (D)	7R, 2I	15R, 5I	Gregorio Sablan (I)
2019	Ralph Torres (R)	Arnold Palacios (R)	Edward Manibusan (D)	6R, 3I	13R, 7I	Gregorio Sablan (I)
2020	Ralph Torres (R)	Arnold Palacios (R)	Edward Manibusan (D)	6R, 3I	13R, 7I	Gregorio Sablan (I)
2021	Ralph Torres (R)	Arnold Palacios (R)	Edward Manibusan (D)	5R, 3I, 1D	9R, 8D, 2ID, 1IR (Note: Edmund Villagomez, a Democratic-aligned Independent, was elected Speaker and leads the majority caucus.)	Gregorio Sablan (I)
2022	Ralph Torres (R)	Arnold Palacios (I) (Note: In November of 2021, Palacios announced he would challenge his running mate Ralph Torres in the 2022 election as an Independent. Palacios switched his party affiliation back to the Republican Party in December 2024, while in office.)	Edward Manibusan (D)	5R, 3I, 1D	9R, 8D, 2ID, 1IR	Gregorio Sablan (I)
2023	Arnold Palacios (I)	David M. Apatang (I)	Edward Manibusan (D)	4R, 3I, 2D (Note: From 2023–2024, all three Independents joined the Democrats to form the governing coalition. From 2025–present, all three Independents joined the Republicans to form the governing coalition.)	13I, 4D, 3R (Note: Twelve Independents joined the Democrats to form the governing coalition.)	Gregorio Sablan (D)
2024	Arnold Palacios (I)	David M. Apatang (I)	Edward Manibusan (D)	4R, 3I, 2D	13I, 4D, 3R	Gregorio Sablan (D)
2025	Arnold Palacios (R)	David M. Apatang (I)	Edward Manibusan (D)	4R, 3I, 2D	16I, 2D, 2R	Kimberlyn King-Hinds (R)
2025	David M. Apatang (I)	Dennis C. Mendiola (R)	Edward Manibusan (D)	4R, 3I, 2D	16I, 2D, 2R	Kimberlyn King-Hinds (R)
2026	David M. Apatang (I)	Dennis C. Mendiola (R)	Edward Manibusan (D)	4R, 3I, 2D	16I, 2D, 2R	Kimberlyn King-Hinds (R)

== See also ==
- Politics of the Northern Mariana Islands
- Elections in the Northern Mariana Islands
- List of political parties in the Northern Mariana Islands
