= 1977 Northern Mariana Islands general election =

General elections were held in the Northern Mariana Islands on 10 December 1977. Carlos S. Camacho of the Democratic Party was elected Governor, defeating Jose C. Tenorio of the Territorial Party. Camacho's running mate Francisco Ada became Lieutenant Governor after a win over Olympio T. Borja. Democratic Party candidate Edward Pangelinan was elected as the territory's member of the United States House of Representatives, defeating Juan T. Lizama of the Territorial Party.

Although it lost the elections for the main posts, the Territorial Party won the legislative election, taking five of the nine seats in the Senate and eight of the fourteen seats in the House of Representatives. Felicidad Ogumoro, who was elected to the House in Saipan, became the first woman elected to the islands' legislature.

== Results ==
=== Senate ===
Constituency	Elected member	Party
Rota	Julian Calvo	Territorial Party
Rota	Joseph Inos	Territorial Party
Rota	Benjamin Manglona	Territorial Party
Saipan	Herman R. Guerrero	Democratic Party
Saipan	Lorenzo Guerrero	Territorial Party
Saipan	Pedro Pangelinan Tenorio	Territorial Party
Tinian	Serafin Dela Cruz	Democratic Party
Tinian	Hilario Diaz	Democratic Party
Tinian	Juan Hofschneider	Democratic Party
Source: Highlights

=== House of Representatives ===
Constituency	Elected member	Party
Rota	Misael H. Ogo	Territorial Party
Saipan	Manases Borja	Democratic Party
Saipan	Antonio Guerrero	Democratic Party
Saipan	Jesus Guerrero	Democratic Party
Saipan	Alonzo Igisomar	Territorial Party
Saipan	Miguel Kileleman	Territorial Party
Saipan	Jose R. Lifoifoi	Territorial Party
Saipan	Pedro Nakatsukasa	Territorial Party
Saipan	Felicidad Ogumoro	Territorial Party
Saipan	Oscar Rasa	Territorial Party
Saipan	Jesus Sonoda	Democratic Party
Saipan	Plasido Tagabuel	Territorial Party
Saipan	Joaquin Villanueva	Democratic Party
Tinian	Serafina King	Democratic Party
Source: Highlights

== Aftermath ==
The new legislature was sworn in on 9 January 1978 Lorenzo Guerrero was elected President of the Senate and Oscar Rasa Speaker of the House of Representatives.
