= Senator Tenorio =

Senator Tenorio may refer to:

- Froilan Tenorio (born 1939), Senate of the Northern Mariana Islands
- Pedro Tenorio (1934–2018), Senate of the Northern Mariana Islands
- Ray Tenorio (born 1965), Senate of Guam
