= List of political parties in the Northern Mariana Islands =

This article lists political parties in the Northern Mariana Islands. The Northern Marianas has a multi-party system, with two or three strong parties and a third party that is electorally successful. As of 28 April 2024, The Democratic Party and the Republican Party are the only two parties represented in elected and appointed offices, though the independents are a majority in the house and make up one-third of the senate.

The Covenant Party was a political party advocating governmental and financial reform. It was named after the Covenant to Establish a Commonwealth of the Northern Mariana Islands in Political Union with the United States of America, Act of Mar. 24, 1976, Pub. L. 94-241, 90 Stat. 263, codified as amended at 48 U.S.C. § 1801 note. The Covenant Party is considered de facto dissolved when Governor Eloy Inos departed the party and rejoined the GOP in 2013. Many left the party soon after, most moving to the Republic Party, making it a de facto GOP absorption of the Covenant Party.

The Reform Party was a political party that was not an affiliate of the Reform Party USA but rather the American Reform Party, a splinter group of that party. The party was founded in 1999 by former Governor Froilan C. Tenorio, who claimed to be disgruntled and tired of the disunity showed by his former political affiliation, the Democrats. In 2002, the party merged back into the Democratic Party.

== Current parties ==
Party	Leader(s)	Founded	Position	Ideology	Delegate Seat	Senate Seats	House Seats	Mayors
Democratic Party		1978	Centre-left	Liberalism, Progressivism, Social liberalism	0 / 1	2 / 9	2 / 20	0 / 4
Republican Party			Centre-right	Conservatism, Fiscal conservatism, Social conservatism	1 / 1	4 / 9	2 / 20	3 / 4

== Historical parties ==
Party	Founded	Disbanded	Description
Covenant Party	2001	2013	The Covenant Party was the first third party in Northern Mariana Islands history to see widespread success and elected into power the first Carolinian governor into office. Covenant was also the first and, as of 2024, only third party to win majorities in either the territorial house and senate, as well as holding all the mayoral seats.
Popular Party		1978	The CNMI Popular Party was the predecessor of the modern CNMI Democratic Party. This party is well-known for being the one to originally support reunification with Guam.
Reform Party	1999	2002	The Reform Party was a political party in the Northern Mariana Islands. It was not an affiliate of the Reform Party USA but rather the American Reform Party, a splinter group. The party was founded in 1999 by former Governor Froilan C. Tenorio, who claimed to be disgruntled and tired of the disunity showed by his former political affiliation, the Democrats. Reform became the first third party in the Northern Mariana Islands to win an elected seat (and their only win) in the Northern Mariana Island Senate during the 1999 general elections with candidate Ramon "Kumoi" Santos Deleon Guerrero.
Territorial Party			The CNMI Territorial Party was the predecessor of the modern CNMI Republican Party. This party is well-known for being the one to oppose reunification with Guam. A majority of the party's members and supporters were Carolinians, but nearly all of its leaders were wealthy Chamorros. The latter, by and large, were local entrepreneurs and businessmen who were afraid that closer ties with Guam would result in an influx of capital or branch-plants that would compete with their own. The Territorial Party was an alliance of the richest and poorest strata of Saipan society.

== See also ==
- Politics of the Northern Mariana Islands
- List of political parties by country
- Political party strength in the Northern Mariana Islands
