= 1981 United States gubernatorial elections =

← 1980	November 3, 1981	1982 →

3 governorships 2 states; 1 territory
	Majority party	Minority party
Party	Democratic	Republican
Seats before	27	23
Seats after	27	23
Seat change	Steady	Steady
Seats up	1	1
Seats won	1	1
- Republican gain Democratic gain

United States gubernatorial elections were held on November 3, 1981, in two states and one territory. Both state seats were open due to term limits, and both also switched parties, resulting in zero net change for both parties. As of 2025, this is the last time where Virginia and New Jersey's governorships switched to opposite parties.

== Election results ==
=== States ===
State	Incumbent	Party	First elected	Result	Candidates
New Jersey	Brendan Byrne	Democratic	1973	Incumbent term-limited. New governor elected. Republican gain.	✓ Thomas Kean (Republican) 49.5%; James Florio (Democratic) 49.4%
Virginia	John N. Dalton	Republican	1977	Incumbent term-limited. New governor elected. Democratic gain.	✓ Chuck Robb (Democratic) 53.6%; Marshall Coleman (Republican) 46.4%

=== Territories ===
State	Incumbent	Party	First elected	Result	Candidates
Northern Mariana Islands	Carlos Camacho	Democratic	1977	Incumbent lost re-election. New governor elected. Republican gain.	✓ Pedro Tenorio (Republican) 3,447 (56.68%); Carlos Camacho (Popular Democratic) 1,403 (23.07%); Herman R. Guerrero (Democratic) 1,232 (20.26%)

== Close states ==
States where the margin of victory was under 1%:

1. New Jersey, 0.1%

States where the margin of victory was under 10%:

1. Virginia, 7.2%

== New Jersey ==
1981 New Jersey gubernatorial election
← 1977	November 3, 1981	1985 →
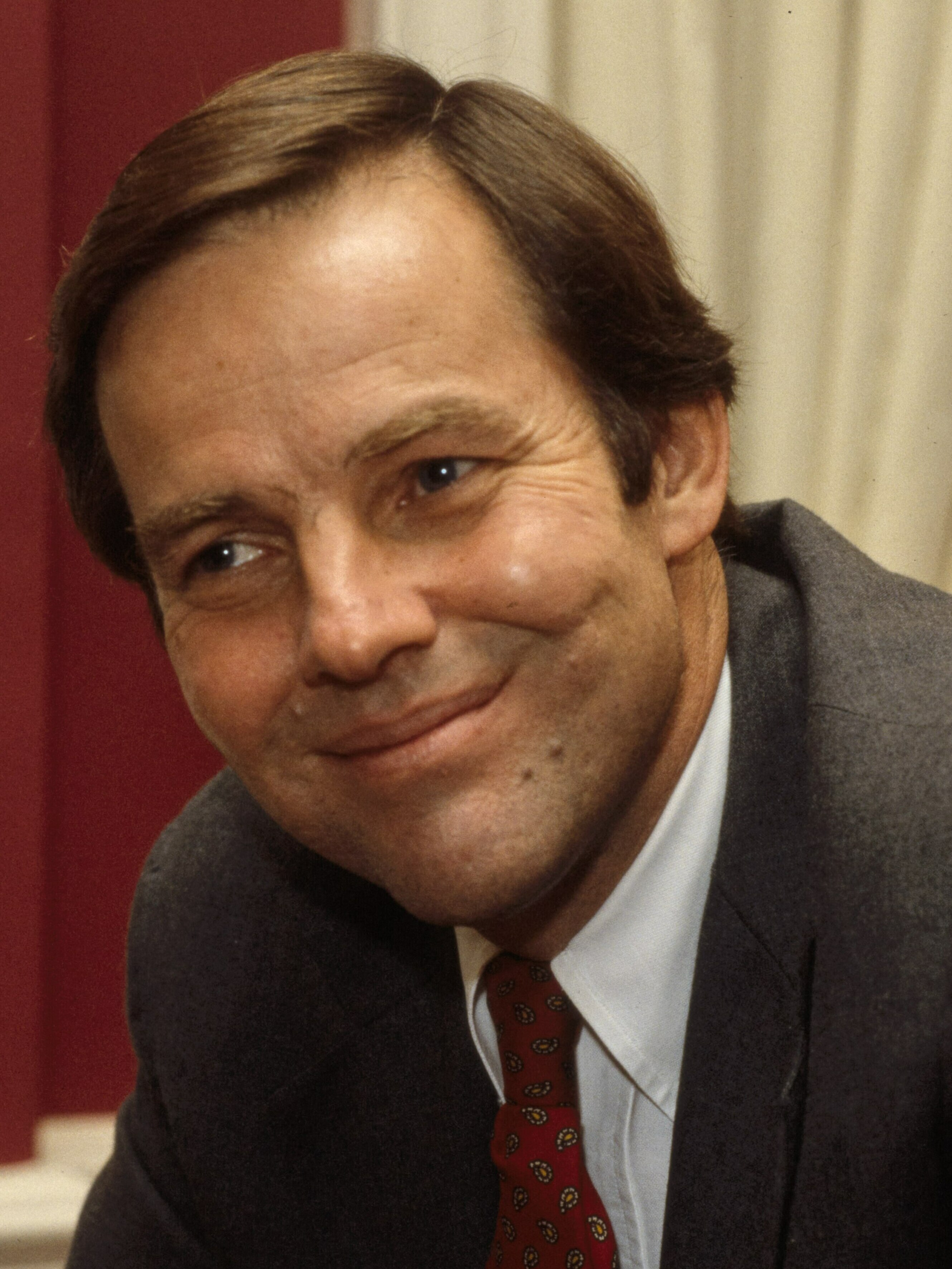

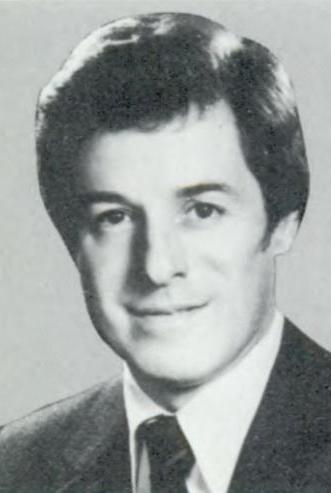
Candidate	Thomas Kean	James Florio
Party	Republican	Democratic
Popular vote	1,145,999	1,144,202
Percentage	49.46%	49.38%
- Kean: 50–60% 60–70% Florio: 40–50% 50–60% 60–70% 70–80%
Governor before election
Brendan Byrne
Democratic
Elected Governor
Thomas Kean
Republican

The 1981 New Jersey gubernatorial election was held November 3, 1981. Republican Speaker of the New Jersey General Assembly Thomas Kean narrowly defeated Democratic U.S. Representative James Florio, 49.46%-49.38, following a recount. Kean's margin of victory was 1,797 votes out of more than two million votes cast. As of 2025, the 1981 gubernatorial election remains the closest gubernatorial contest in New Jersey history.

== Virginia ==
1981 Virginia gubernatorial election
← 1977	November 3, 1981	1985 →
- Turnout: 64.8% (voting eligible)
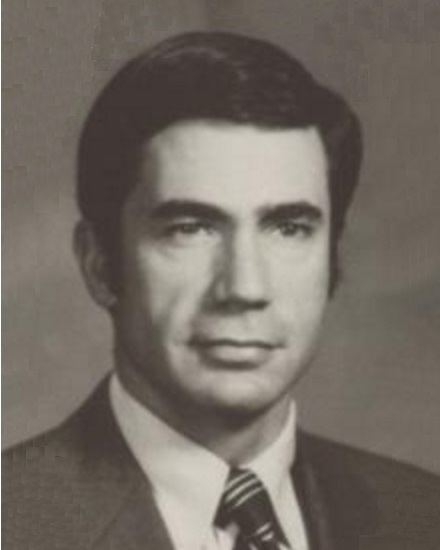

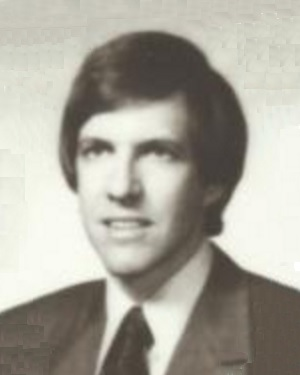
Nominee	Chuck Robb	Marshall Coleman
Party	Democratic	Republican
Popular vote	760,357	659,398
Percentage	53.56%	46.44%
- County and independent city results Robb: 50–60% 60–70% 70–80% 80–90% Coleman: 40–50% 50–60% 60–70%
Governor before election
John N. Dalton
Republican
Elected Governor
Chuck Robb
Democratic

In the 1981 Virginia gubernatorial election, Republican incumbent Governor John N. Dalton was unable to seek re-election due to term limits. Chuck Robb, the Lieutenant Governor of Virginia, was nominated by the Democratic Party to run against the Republican nominee, state Attorney General J. Marshall Coleman.

Robb's victory ended 12 consecutive years of Republican control of the Governor's Mansion. Fairfax County voted Democratic for Governor for the first time since 1949.

== Territories ==
=== Northern Mariana Islands ===
Northern Marina Islands election
Party	Candidate	Votes	%
Republican	Pedro Tenorio	{{{votes}}}	56.68%
Independent	Carlos Camacho	{{{votes}}}	23.07%
Democratic	Herman R. Guerrero	{{{votes}}}	20.26%
Total votes		{{{votes}}}	100.00
Republican hold			
