= Edith DeLeon Guerrero =

American politician

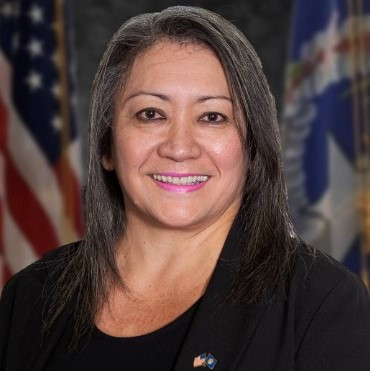

President of the Northern Mariana Islands Senate
- In office January 9, 2023 – January 13, 2025
- Preceded by: Jude Hofschneider
- Succeeded by: Dennis C. Mendiola

Member of the Northern Mariana Islands Senate from the 3rd district
- In office January 11, 2021 – January 13, 2025
- Preceded by: Sixto Igisomar
- Succeeded by: Manny Castro

Personal details
- Political party: Democratic (before 2025); Independent (2025–present)
- Relatives: Larry De Leon Guerrero (father)

Edith E. DeLeon Guerrero is an American politician serving as a member of the Northern Mariana Islands Senate for the 3rd district. Elected in November 2020, she assumed office on January 11, 2021.

== Life and career ==
In 2000, Governor Pedro Pangelinan Tenorio appointed her to the Marianas Public Land Trust. She was reappointed in 2004 by Governor Juan Babauta and served until 2006. In 2006, she became the director of the CNMI Workforce Investment Agency. She was a life insurance agent for ten years before serving as the director of the Workforce Investment Agency.

In 2013, Governor Eloy Inos merged the Workforce Investment Agency and the Department of Labor. On October 3, 2013, Inos nominated DeLeon Guerrero, then Director of the Workforce Investment Agency, to serve as the Secretary of Labor. She was sworn in on December 26, 2013. Guerrero then served as secretary of the Northern Mariana Islands Department of Labor until 2017.

Her father, Lorenzo I. De Leon Guerrero, was the 13th Governor of the Northern Mariana Islands.

== CNMI Senate ==
In the 2020 general election, Guerrero defeated Republican incumbent Sixto K. Igisomar to become the first Democrat to win a Senate seat in Saipan since 2003. On January 10, 2023, DeLeon Guerrero became the first woman to serve as President of the Northern Mariana Islands Senate. She took over the position from Jude Hofschneider. On February 12, 2024, Guerrero stated she would be leaving the Democratic Party at the end of her term.

After exploring a run for Delegate in the 2024 election, DeLeon Guerero chose to run for reelection to the Senate as an independent. In the 2024 general election, Democratic nominee Representative Manny Castro defeated DeLeon Guerrero, receiving 5,178 votes to Deleon Guerrero's 4,210 votes.

Political offices
Preceded by Jude Hofschneider	President of the Northern Mariana Islands Senate; 2023–2025	Succeeded by Dennis C. Mendiola
