= Paul Manglona =

Northern Mariana Islands politician

Paul Mangloña
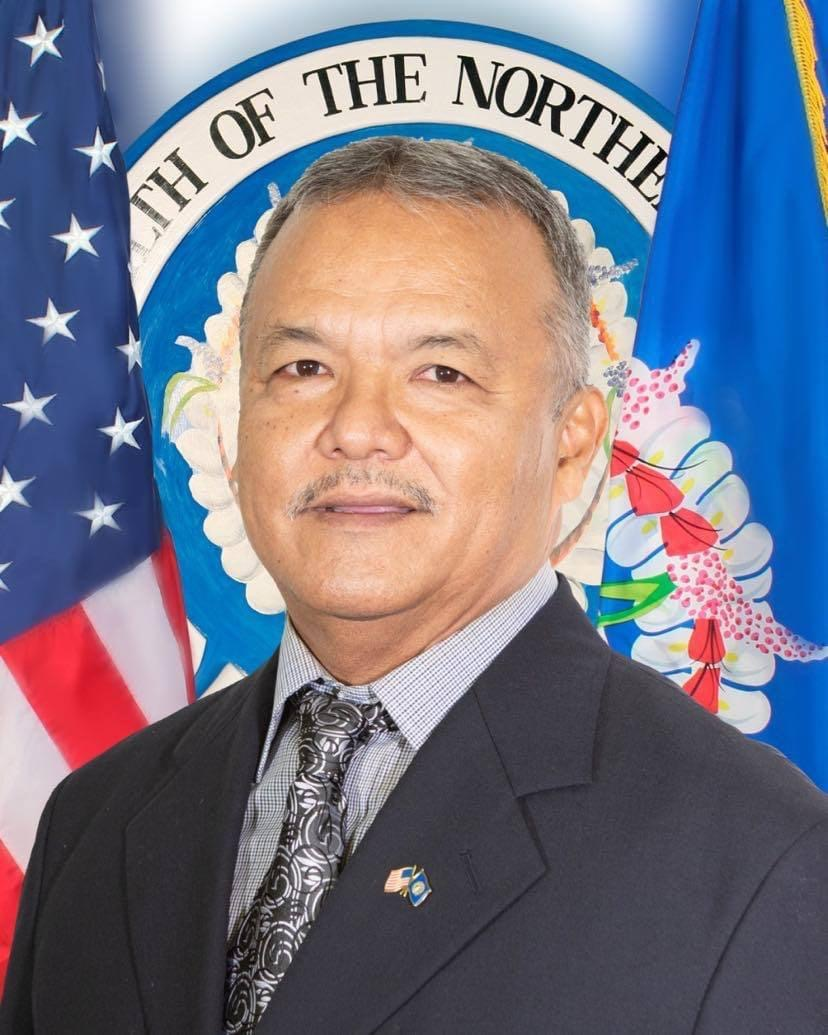
- Official portrait, 2021

President of the Northern Mariana Islands Senate
- In office January 11, 2010 – January 14, 2013
- Preceded by: Pete Reyes
- Succeeded by: Jude Hofschneider
- In office 1998 – January 12, 2004
- Preceded by: Jesus Sablan
- Succeeded by: Joaquin G. Adriano

Personal details
- Born: January 25, 1958 (age 68) Rota, Northern Mariana Islands
- Party: Independent; Republican (former)
- Education: Santa Clara University
- Profession: Politician

Paul Atalig Mangloña (born January 25, 1958) is a politician from the Northern Mariana Islands and an incumbent member of the Northern Mariana Islands Senate from Rota. He was sworn into office on July 31, 2025 and previously served in the Senate from January 1988 to January 2013, again from November 2013 to January 2015, and again from February 2016 to January 2025.

== Biography ==
He was born on January 25, 1958, to Prudencio Taisacan Manglona, a longtime Mayor of Rota, and Bernadita Atalig Manglona. He graduated from Father Duenas Memorial High School in Guam in 1976 as the valedictorian. He then graduated from Santa Clara University with a BA Degree in civil engineering and further studied at San Jose State University. He returned to the Northern Mariana Islands and worked for the CMS Construction before working for Rota's Public Works.

== Political career ==
In 1985, Mangloña was a delegate to the Second Constitutional Convention.

=== First Senate tenure ===
He was elected in the 1987 election as a Republican to succeed outgoing Senator Julian Songao Calvo. In 1995, while Vice President of the Senate, served as acting governor when other officials in the line of succession were off island. He made several bill signings and vetoes which were ultimately reviewed by the courts. During his first tenue, Mangloña served as the chamber’s president on multiple occasions. Mangloña lost the 2012 Senate election to Republican Victor Hocog.

=== Later Senate tenures ===
In 2013, Senator Juan Manglona Ayuyu was convicted of smuggling of federally protected Mariana fruit bats. The conviction created a vacancy which the Northern Mariana Islands Supreme Court ruled would be filled by Mangloña until the next general election. In the 2014 general election, Manglona finished third of five candidates for two seats. The winners were Republican candidates Teresita Santos and Steven King Mesngon.

Mangloña was again appointed to the Senate on February 10, 2016 to succeed Victor Hocog upon Hocog’s elevation to Lieutenant Governor of the Northern Mariana Islands. In the 2024 general election, Manglona lost to special education teacher Ronnie Mendiola Calvo. After the elevation of Dennis C. Mendiola to the lieutenant governorship, Mangloña was once again appointed to a Senate vacancy.

Preceded by Pete Reyes	President of the Northern Mariana Islands Senate; 2010–2013	Succeeded by Jude Hofschneider
Preceded by Joaquin G. Adriano	President of the Northern Mariana Islands Senate; 1998-2004	Succeeded by Joseph M. Mendiola
Preceded by Dennis C. Mendiola	Member of the Northern Mariana Islands Senate from Rota; 2025-present	Succeeded by Incumbent
Preceded by Victor Hocog	Member of the Northern Mariana Islands Senate from Rota; 2016-2025	Succeeded by Ronnie Mendiola Calvo
Preceded by Juan Manglona Ayuyu	Member of the Northern Mariana Islands Senate from Rota; 2013-2015	Succeeded by Teresita Santos; Steven King Mesngon
Preceded by Julian Songao Calvo	Member of the Northern Mariana Islands Senate from Rota; 1988-2013	Succeeded by Victor Hocog
