= Misael H. Ogo =

Northern Mariana Islands politician

Member of the House of Representatives
- In office 1977–1983
- Succeeded by: Victor Hocog
- Constituency: Rota

Personal details
- Died: 23 December 1984; Rota, Northern Mariana Islands
- Political party: Territorial Party, Republican Party

Misael Hocog Ogo (died 23 December 1984) was a Northern Mariana Islands politician. He served as a member of the House of Representatives from 1977 to 1983.

== Biography ==
In 1969 Ogo was appointed to Rota Council. He remained a member until 1977, twice serving as vice-speaker.

In 1977 he was elected to the House of Representatives from the Rota constituency as a member of the Territorial Party. During his first term, he served as Vice Speaker. He was re-elected in 1979, and 1981, when he ran as a Republican Party candidate. He lost his seat in the 1983 elections. During his time in the legislature he chaired the House Committee on Health, Education and Welfare and sponsored the bill to establish Northern Marianas College.

He died in December 1984 and was given a state funeral.
