= Eli Cabrera =

Eliceo Diaz Cabrera (August 22, 1957 - December 1, 2024) was a politician from the Northern Mariana Islands. He served as speaker of the Northern Mariana Islands House of Representatives during part of the 17th Commonwealth Legislature.

== Biography ==
He was a budget officer during the administration of Governor Froilan Tenorio. In 2009, he was elected to the Northern Mariana Islands House of Representatives to represent Precinct #1 for the 17th Commonwealth Legislature. During the 17th Commonwealth Legislature, Speaker Froilan Tenorio resigned from the speakership on January 13, 2011. Cabrera defeated Diego Benavente by a 12-7 vote to become Speaker for the remainder of the 17th Commonwealth Legislature. He was an unsuccessful candidate for reelection, finishing tenth of twelve candidates for six seats in Precinct #1.

After his time in the legislature, he again severed in the executive branch as the director of Parks and Recreation under Eloy Inos and as the Bureau of Environmental and Coastal Quality Administrator under Ralph Torres and Arnold Palacios. In 2022, he briefly campaigned for Mayor of Saipan to succeed a term-limited David M. Apatang before dropping out for health-related reasons. On December 1, 2024, Cabrera died as a result of pancreatic cancer at Commonwealth Health Center.
