= Felicidad Ogumoro =

Northern Mariana politician (1949–2024)

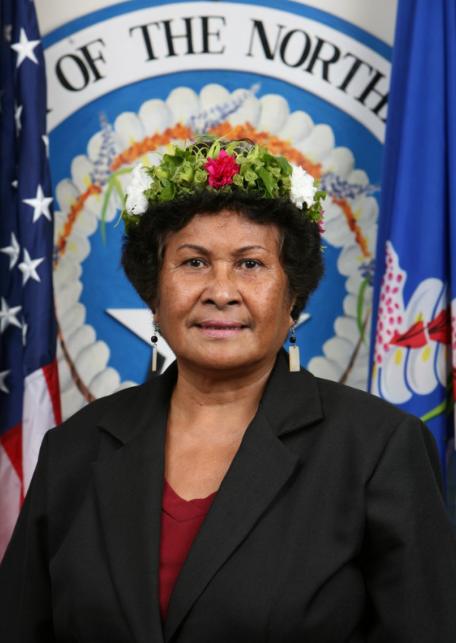

Vice Speaker of the Northern Mariana Islands House of Representatives
- In office January 2010 – January 2013
- Preceded by: Joseph Deleon Guerrero
- Succeeded by: Francisco Dela Cruz

Personal details
- Born: Felicidad Taman Ogumoro; 1 September 1949 Saipan, Mariana Islands, Trust Territory of the Pacific Islands
- Died: January 2024 (aged 74)
- Party: Republican (2013–2024); Covenant (2009–2013); Reform (2001); Democratic (1979–2001)
- Spouse: Francisco Uludong (m. 1976; died 1991)
- Children: 4
- Education: University of Saint Mary
- Profession: Businesswoman; Politician

Felicidad Leiwamal Taman Ogumoro (September 1, 1949 – January 2024) was a politician from the Northern Mariana Islands. She served for some years as a member of the Northern Mariana Islands House of Representatives.

== Early life and career ==
Felicidad Leiwamal Taman Ogumoro was born September 1, 1949. She was born into a poor Carolinian family on Saipan, the daughter of Daniel Rogolifoi Ogumoro and Estefania Taman; she is the eldest of eight children. During her childhood, she trained to become a member of the Order of the Blessed Virgin Mary of Mercy and attended Mt. Carmel High School, a parochial school in Saipan. She then attended the University of Saint Mary in Kansas and earned a B.A. in sociology. She married Francisco Uludong in 1976 and they remained married until his death in 1991. She and Francisco had six children. She was very involved in the United Carolinians Association and participated in its reestablishment in 2020.

== First legislative terms ==
Ogumoro was elected to serve in the 1st Legislature of the Northern Mariana Islands. She and Serafina Rosario King was the first woman to serve in the Northern Mariana Islands House of Representatives. She was reelected in 1979 as a Democrat. During the 1st and 2nd legislatures, she served as the Chairwoman of the House Committee on Health, Education, and Welfare. In the 1981 general election, Ogumoro, again the Democratic candidate, was swept out in a Republican wave election.

== Between legislative terms ==
After her first tenure in the legislature, she organized Western Pacific Associates, Micronesia's first locally owned public relations and business consulting firm. She was a delegate to the Second Constitutional Convention in 1985. In the 1990s, she led a small nationalist group called Inetnon Taotao Tano which opposed foreign development in the CNMI. In 1991, she ran for the House from Precinct IV on a platform to establish a trust fund for future generations, fund housing development on homesteads and private property, improve education, and promote entrepreneurship.

In 2001, she left the Democratic Party and joined former Governor Froilan Tenorio in establishing the Reform Party, an affiliate of the American Reform Party. Governor Juan Babauta nominated Ogumoro to the Commonwealth Ports Authority board of directors in 2005.

== Second legislative terms ==
In the 2009 general election, Ogumoro was elected to the House for a second tenure.

In the 17th Commonwealth Legislature, Ogumoro was chosen to serve as the Vice Speaker of the House. She succeeded Joseph Pinaula Deleon Guerrero who served in the position during the 16th Commonwealth Legislature. In her capacity as Vice Speaker, she served as Acting Speaker when Speaker Froilan Tenorio was off island. Francisco Santos Dela Cruz took over as Vice Speaker for the 18th Commonwealth Legislature.

Ogumoro was a member of the House of Representatives when Janet Maratita was sworn into office in 2011; the two women, alongside Teresita Santos, were the first three to serve simultaneously in the House. Among her areas of interest while in the House was a desire to create a Northern Marianas Cultural Center.

Originally elected as a member of the Covenant Party, Ogumoro chose to follow Governor Benigno Fitial to the Republican Party. Ogumoro was one of four legislators to vote "no" on each article of impeachment against Fitial. Ogumoro was reelected in 2012 and 2014. Ogumoro opted not to run for reelection in the 2016 general election and retired after the 19th Commonwealth Legislature. After leaving the Legislature, Ogumoro was appointed to the advisory board of the Department of Public Lands.

== Death ==
Ogumoro died in January 2024, at the age of 74.
