= 1997 United States gubernatorial elections =

← 1996	November 4, 1997	1998 →

3 governorships 2 states; 1 territory
	Majority party	Minority party
Party	Republican	Democratic
Seats before	32	17
Seats after	32	17
Seat change	Steady	Steady
Popular vote	2,102,546	'1,846,939
Percentage	50.6%	44.45%
Seats up	2	0
Seats won	2	0
- Map of the results Republican gain Republican hold No election

United States gubernatorial elections were held on November 4, 1997, in two states and one territory. Republicans retained both seats.

== Election results ==
=== States ===
State	Incumbent	Party	First elected	Result	Candidates
New Jersey	Christine Todd Whitman	Republican	1993	Incumbent re-elected.	✓ Christine Todd Whitman (Republican) 46.9%; Jim McGreevey (Democratic) 45.8%; Murray Sabrin (Libertarian) 4.7%; Richard Pezzullo (Conservative) 1.4%
Virginia	George Allen	Republican	1993	Incumbent term-limited. New governor elected. Republican hold.	✓ Jim Gilmore (Republican) 55.8%; Don Beyer (Democratic) 42.6%

=== Territory ===
State	Incumbent	Party	First elected	Result	Candidates
Northern Mariana Islands	Froilan Tenorio	Democratic	1993	Incumbent lost re-election. New governor elected. Republican gain.	✓ Pedro Tenorio (Republican) 46.5%; Froilan Tenorio (Democratic) 27.3%; Jesus Borja (Independent) 26.3%

== Closest races ==
States where the margin of victory was under 5%:

1. New Jersey, 1.1%

== New Jersey ==
1997 New Jersey gubernatorial election
← 1993	November 4, 1997	2001 →
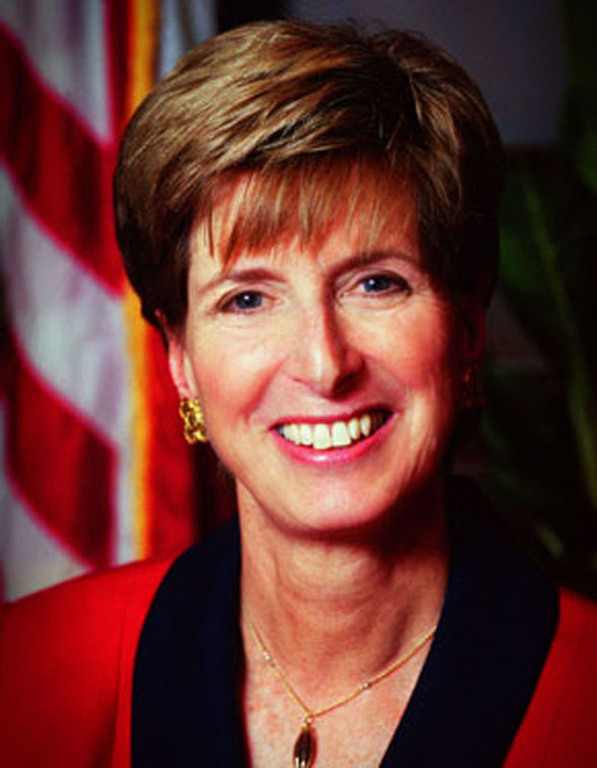

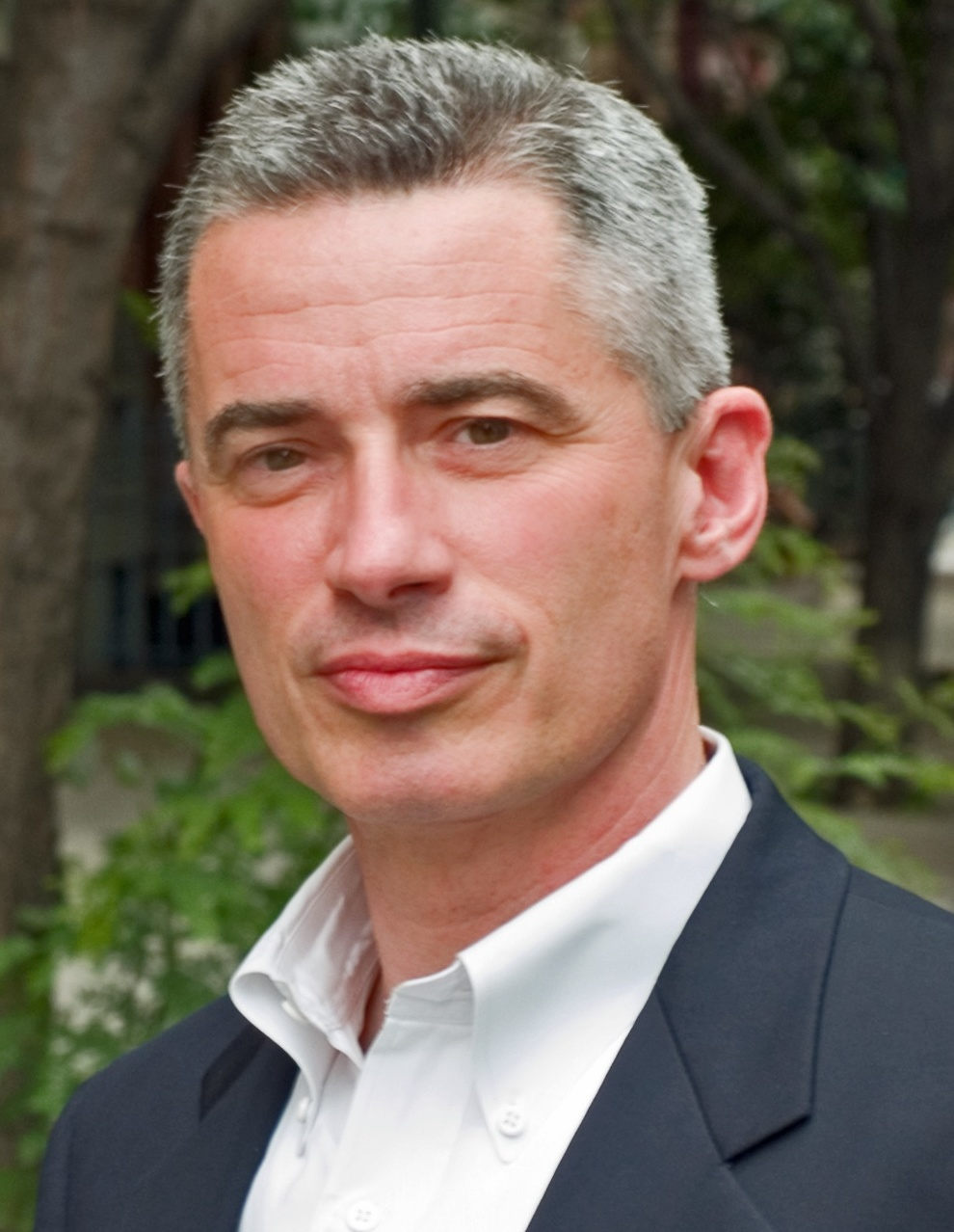
Nominee	Christine Todd Whitman	Jim McGreevey
Party	Republican	Democratic
Popular vote	1,133,394	1,107,968
Percentage	46.9%	45.8%
- Whitman: 40–50% 50–60% 60–70% McGreevey: 40–50% 50–60% 60–70% 70–80%
Governor before election
Christine Todd Whitman
Republican
Elected Governor
Christine Todd Whitman
Republican

The 1997 New Jersey gubernatorial election was held on November 4, 1997. In the Democratic primary, state senator and Woodbridge Township mayor James McGreevey defeated pre-U.S. Rep. Rob Andrews by 9,993 votes. In the general election, Republican Governor Christine Todd Whitman defeated McGreevey by 26,953 votes. Whitman won 46.87% of the vote, with Democratic nominee James McGreevey receiving 45.82% and Libertarian Murray Sabrin receiving 4.7%.

== Virginia ==
1997 Virginia gubernatorial election
← 1993	November 4, 1997	2001 →
- Turnout: 49.5% (voting eligible)
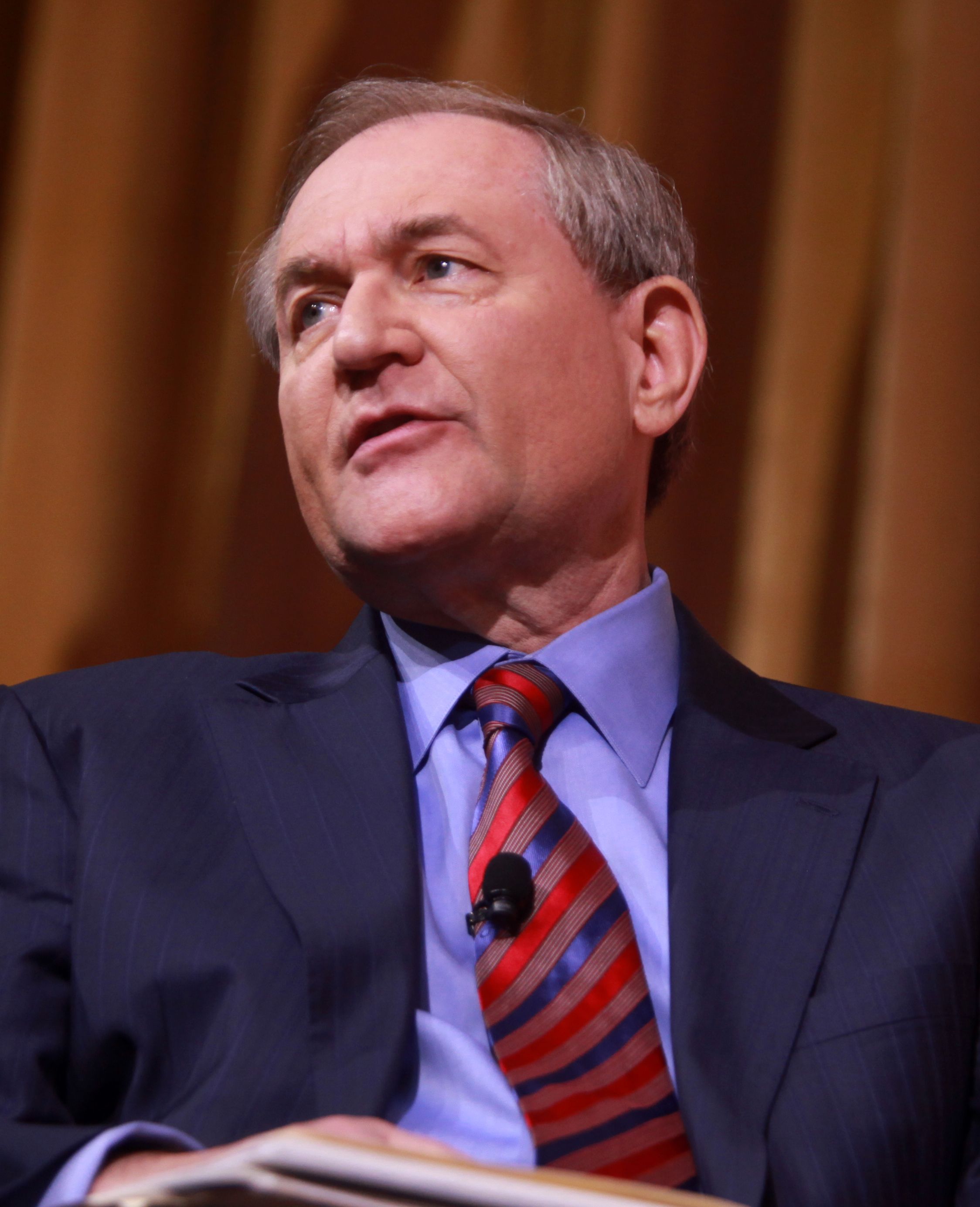

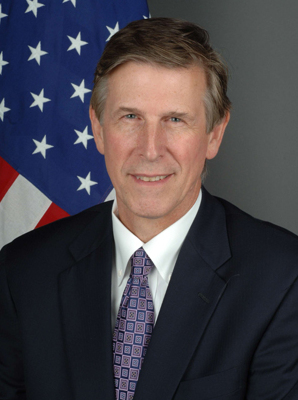
Nominee	Jim Gilmore	Don Beyer
Party	Republican	Democratic
Popular vote	969,062	738,971
Percentage	55.8%	42.6%
- County and independent city results Gilmore: 40–50% 50–60% 60–70% 70–80% Beyer: 40–50% 50–60% 60–70%
Governor before election
George Allen
Republican
Elected Governor
Jim Gilmore
Republican

The 1997 Virginia gubernatorial election was held on November 4, 1997. The incumbent Governor, George Allen, was barred from seeking a second term due to Virginia's unique term limits law. The Republican candidate, Jim Gilmore, the Attorney General of Virginia defeated the Democratic nominee, Don Beyer, the incumbent Lieutenant Governor.

== Territories ==
=== Northern Mariana Islands ===
Northern Marina Islands election
Party	Candidate	Votes	%
Republican	Pedro Tenorio	{{{votes}}}	46.5%
Democratic	Froilan Tenorio	{{{votes}}}	27.3%
Independent	Jesus Borja	{{{votes}}}	26.3%
Total votes		{{{votes}}}	100.00
Republican hold			
