= List of presidents of the Senate of the Northern Mariana Islands =

The president of the Northern Mariana Islands Senate is the presiding officer of the upper chamber of that Northern Mariana Islands Commonwealth Legislature, in the Commonwealth of the Northern Mariana Islands (CNMI).

Name	Period
Lorenzo Guerrero	1978–1980
Pedro P. Tenorio	1980–1982
Olympio Borja	1982–1984
Ponce Rasa	1984–1986
Julian Calvo	1986–1988
Benjamin Mangloña	1988–1990
Joseph Inos	1990–1992
Juan Demapan	1992–1994
Jesus R. Sablan	1994–1998
Paul Manglona	1998–2004
Joaquin Adriano	2004–2006
Joseph M. Mendiola	2006–2008
Pete Reyes	2008–2010
Paul Manglona	2010–2013
Jude Hofschneider	2013
Ralph Torres	2013–2015
Victor Hocog	2015
Francisco Borja	2016–2017
Arnold Palacios	2017–2019
Victor Hocog	2019–2021
Jude Hofschneider	2021–2023
Edith DeLeon Guerrero	2023–2025
Dennis C. Mendiola	2025
Karl King-Nabors	2025–present

== Sources ==
- Information through 2012 provided by Simion Lisua, Clerk of the Northern Mariana Legislature
