= Jesus Sablan =

Northern Mariana Islands politician (born 1952)

5th Lieutenant Governor of the Northern Mariana Islands
- In office January 12, 1998 – January 14, 2002
- Governor: Pedro Pangelinan Tenorio
- Preceded by: Jesus Camacho Borja
- Succeeded by: Diego Tenorio Benavente

President of the Northern Mariana Islands Senate
- In office January 10, 1994 – January 12, 1998
- Preceded by: Juan S. Demapan
- Succeeded by: Paul Atalig Mangloña

Personal details
- Born: Jesus Rosario Sablan; April 16, 1952 (age 73) Saipan, Mariana Islands, Trust Territory of the Pacific Islands
- Party: Republican

Jesus Rosario "Pepero" Sablan (born April 16, 1952) is a Northern Mariana Islander politician who served as the fifth lieutenant governor of the Northern Mariana Islands from January 12, 1998, to January 14, 2002, under former Governor Pedro Tenorio.

Sablan ran as a Republican candidate for governor in the 2001 gubernatorial election. However, he was defeated in the Republican primary election by Juan Babauta, who went on to win the general election in November 2001. Though some observers expected Sablan to pursue a campaign for governor as an independent or a write-in candidate, Sablan ultimately withdrew from the race after the Republican primary.

Political offices
Preceded by Jesus Borja	Lieutenant Governor of the Northern Mariana Islands; 1998–2002	Succeeded by Diego Benavente
