= Jude Hofschneider =

American politician (born 1970)

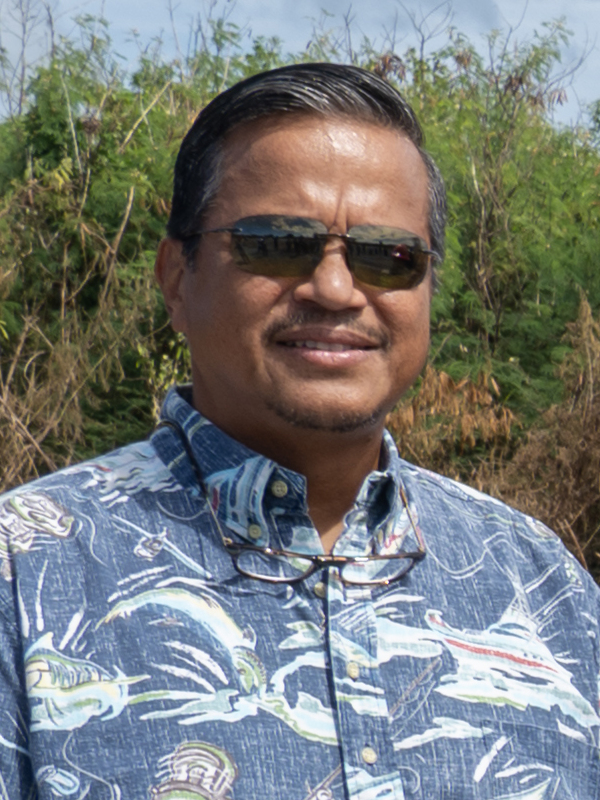
- Hofschneider in 2024

President of the Northern Mariana Islands Senate
- In office January 11, 2021 – January 9, 2023
- Preceded by: Victor Hocog
- Succeeded by: Edith DeLeon Guerrero
- In office January 14, 2013 – February 20, 2013
- Preceded by: Paul Manglona
- Succeeded by: Ralph Torres

9th Lieutenant Governor of the Northern Mariana Islands
- In office February 20, 2013 – January 12, 2015
- Governor: Eloy Inos
- Preceded by: Eloy Inos
- Succeeded by: Ralph Torres

Personal details
- Born: July 11, 1970 (age 56) Mariana Islands, Trust Territory of the Pacific Islands
- Party: Republican
- Education: Northern Marianas College; University of Wisconsin, Madison; University of Phoenix

Jude Untalan Hofschneider (born July 11, 1970) is a Northern Marianan politician and member of the Northern Mariana Islands from the 2nd district. He has served as that body's President on two occasions and as the 9th Lieutenant Governor of the Northern Mariana Islands from February 20, 2013 to January 12, 2015. He was automatically elevated to this position on February 20, 2013, when the former lieutenant governor, Eloy S. Inos, assumed the governorship.

== Background and personal life ==
Jude Untalan Hofschneider was born July 11, 1970. Hofschneider graduated from Reynolds High School at Troutdale, Oregon in 1988. His initial civil service job was as a soil and water conservation coordinator. He went on to receive an associate degree from Northern Marianas College in 1996. Hofschneider then served as an environmental specialist in the Tinian Department of Public Works, and later the deputy director of that agency. Enrolled with University of Phoenix on-line curriculum.

== Political career ==
=== Municipal office ===
In 2004, Hofschneider was elected to the Tinian & Aguiguan Municipal Council. He served for two years on the Association of Mariana Islands Mayors and Municipal Councilors (AMIM).

=== Commonwealth Legislature ===
In 2006, Hofschneider won election to the Northern Mariana Islands Commonwealth Legislature as a senator. In his seven years serving with that body, he acted in a variety of roles. From 2010 to 2013 he was the vice president of the Senate. Hofschneider was elected President of the Northern Marianas Islands Senate by acclimation at the start of the 18th Commonwealth Legislature. After the resignation of Benigno Fitial and elevation of Eloy Inos to serve as Governor, Hofschneider was elevated to Lieutenant Governor of the Northern Mariana Islands. The Senate elected Ralph Torres to serve as President for the remainder of the 18th Commonwealth Legislature.

=== Lieutenant governorship ===
Hofschneider took up the lieutenant governorship in February 2013. He served as acting governor while the governor was out of the commonwealth. His term ended in 2015.

== See also ==
- List of governors of the Northern Mariana Islands
- Lieutenant Governor of the Northern Mariana Islands

Political offices
Preceded by Paul Manglona	President of the Northern Mariana Islands Senate; 2013	Succeeded by Ralph Torres
Preceded by Eloy Inos	Lieutenant Governor of the Northern Mariana Islands; 2013–2015	Succeeded by Ralph Torres
Preceded by Victor Hocog	President of the Northern Mariana Islands Senate; 2021–2023	Succeeded by Edith DeLeon Guerrero
