= Reform Party (Northern Mariana Islands) =

1999-2003 political party in the Northern Mariana Islands

- Founder: Froilan Tenorio
- Founded: 1999
- Dissolved: 2002
- Split from: Democratic Party
- Merged into: Democratic Party
- Ideology: Populism; Radical centrism
- Political position: Radical centrism
- Colors: Purple

The Reform Party was a political party in the Northern Mariana Islands. It was not an affiliate of the Reform Party USA; rather, it was affiliated with the American Reform Party, which is a splinter group of Reform Party USA.

== History ==
The Reform Party was founded in 1999 by former Governor Froilan C. Tenorio, who claimed to be disgruntled and tired of the disunity showed by his former political affiliation, the Democrats. He also targeted the Republicans, saying that they did nothing to improve the slumping economy. Despite this, in 2000, Gubernatorial and Democrat hopeful former Lt. Gov. Jesus C. Borja publicly expressed interest in a Democrat-Reform united front against the Republicans in the 2001 elections.

In the 1999 general elections, the Reform Party won their first and only seat in the Northern Mariana Island Senate with candidate Ramon "Kumoi" Santos Deleon Guerrero.

In the general elections held on 3 November 2001, the party won no seats and gubernatorial candidate Froilan Cruz Tenorio of the Reform Party won 1,368 votes out of the 12,124 votes (11.3%) coming in fourth place, defeated by the Republicans (42.8%), Covenant (24.4%), and Democrats (17.5%). The Reform Party was formally dissolved in 2002, remerging into the Democratic Party. Party founder Froilan Tenorio would switch back to the Democratic Party for his 2005 Gubernatorial bid. Their website no longer exists. It is only accessible through the Wayback Machine, which shows the last moment it was accessible is 2008 and that the last newsletter posted was by former Senator Ramon "Kumoi" Santos Deleon Guerrero on 10 December 2001.

== Electoral history ==
=== CNMI Gubernatorial elections ===
Year	Nominees		First Round			Result
Year	Governor	Lieutenant Governor	Votes	Percentage	Placement	Result
2001	Froilan Cruz "Lang" Tenorio	Dave C. Sablan	1,368	11.75%	4th	Lost

=== CNMI Territorial Senate elections ===
Year	District	Candidate	Votes	Percentage	Placement	Result
1999	Saipan & Northern Islands 3rd Senatorial District (1 seat)	Ramon "Kumoi" Santos Deleon Guerrero	4,420	52.67%	1st	Won

=== CNMI Territorial House of Representatives elections ===
Year	District	Candidate	Votes	Percentage	Placement	Result
1999	District 1: Saipan (6 seats)	Pedro P. Castro	1,067	4.89%	12th	Lost
1999	District 1: Saipan (6 seats)	Joseph M. Palacios	807	3.70%	15th	Lost
1999	District 1: Saipan (6 seats)	Pedreo T. Nakatsukasa	391	1.79%	16th	Lost
1999	District 2: Saipan (2 seats)	Anicia Q. Tomokane	304	19.51%	3rd	Lost
1999	District 2: Saipan (2 seats)	Vicente Hosono Sablan	248	15.91%	4th	Lost
1999	District 3: Saipan & Northern Islands (6 seats)	Joaquin T. Quitugua	307	2.55%	11th	Lost
1999	District 4: Saipan (2 seats)	Josephine Deleion Guererro Mesta	324	10.08%	6th	Lost
