= 1993 United States gubernatorial elections =

- November 2, 1993

3 governorships 2 states; 1 territory
| | Majority party | Minority party |
|---|---|---|
| Party | Democratic | Republican |
| Seats before | 31 (Note: Jim Folsom, Jr. (D) succeeded Alabama governor H. Guy Hunt (R) following Hunt's resignation due to criminal indictments and conviction for theft, conspiracy, and ethics violations.) | 17 |
| Seats after | 29 | 19 |
| Seat change | ▼2 | ▲2 |
| Popular vote | 1,943,558 | 2,281,443 |
| Percentage | 45.2% | 53.06% |
| Seats up | 2 | 0 |
| Seats won | 0 | 2 |
- Democratic gain Republican gain

United States gubernatorial elections were held on November 2, 1993, in two states and one territory, as well as for other statewide offices and members of state legislatures. Both seats were originally held by Democrats, but they switched parties following the elections. Additionally, elections were held for the governorship of the Northern Mariana Islands.

As of 2026, this is the last time Democrats won the governorship of the Northern Mariana Islands.

== Election results ==
=== States ===
| State | Incumbent | Party | First elected | Result | Candidates |
|---|---|---|---|---|---|
| New Jersey | James Florio | Democratic | 1989 | Incumbent lost re-election. New governor elected. Republican gain. | ✓ Christine Todd Whitman (Republican) 49.3%; James Florio (Democratic) 48.3% |
| Virginia | Douglas Wilder | Democratic | 1989 | Incumbent term-limited. New governor elected. Republican gain. | ✓ George Allen (Republican) 58.3%; Mary Sue Terry (Democratic) 40.9% |

=== Territory ===
| Territory | Incumbent | Party | First elected | Result | Candidates |
|---|---|---|---|---|---|
| Northern Mariana Islands | Lorenzo I. De Leon Guerrero | Republican | 1989 | Incumbent retired. New governor elected. Democratic gain. | ✓ Froilan Tenorio (Democratic); [data missing] |

== Closest races ==
States where the margin of victory was under 5%:

1. New Jersey, 1.0%

== New Jersey ==
1993 New Jersey gubernatorial election
- November 2, 1993
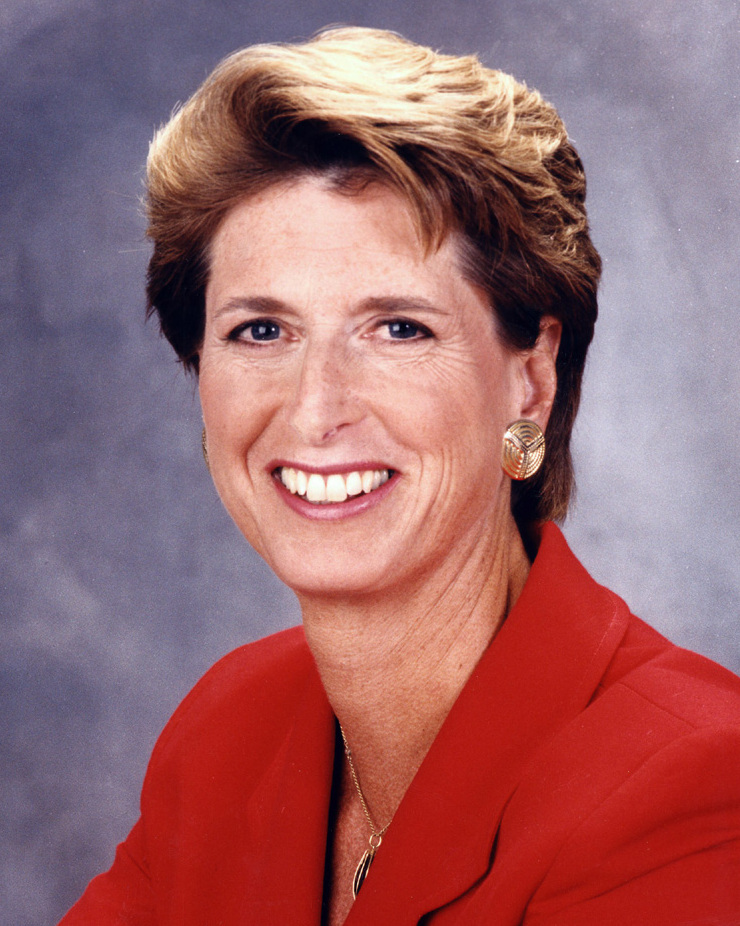

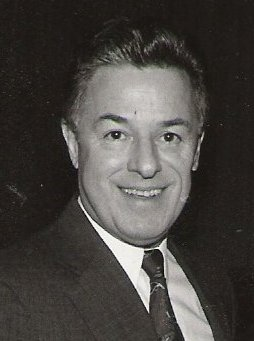
| Nominee | Christine Todd Whitman | James Florio |
| Party | Republican | Democratic |
| Popular vote | 1,236,124 | 1,210,031 |
| Percentage | 49.3% | 48.3% |
- Whitman: 40–50% 50–60% 60–70% Florio: 40–50% 50–60% 60–70%
Governor before election
James Florio
Democratic
Elected Governor
Christine Todd Whitman
Republican

The 1993 New Jersey gubernatorial election was held on November 2, 1993. Incumbent Democratic governor James Florio was narrowly defeated by Republican former Somerset County freeholder and 1990 U.S. Senate nominee Christine Todd Whitman. Primary elections were held on June 8, 1993. In the Democratic primary, Governor Florio's only challenger, anti-tax activist John Budzash, was disqualified from the ballot due to invalid petition signatures. In the Republican primary, Whitman defeated W. Cary Edwards and James Wallwork.

Florio's defeat followed backlash from voters against his administration's tax increases.

== Virginia ==
1993 Virginia gubernatorial election
- November 2, 1993
- Turnout: 61.1% (voting eligible)
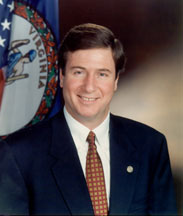

| Nominee | George Allen | Mary Sue Terry |
| Party | Republican | Democratic |
| Popular vote | 1,045,319 | 733,527 |
| Percentage | 58.27% | 40.89% |
- County and independent city results Allen: 50–60% 60–70% 70–80% 80–90% Terry: 50–60% 60–70%
Governor before election
L. Douglas Wilder
Democratic
Elected Governor
George Allen
Republican

The 1993 Virginia gubernatorial election was held on November 2, 1993. Barred from seeking a second term due to term limits restricting consecutive terms for Virginia governor, incumbent Democratic governor L. Douglas Wilder was replaced by Republican nominee and former U.S. representative George Allen. Allen, who had defeated Clinton Miller for the Republican nomination, defeated longtime attorney general of Virginia Mary Sue Terry, the Democratic nominee by 58.27% to 40.89%, which ended 12 consecutive years of Democratic control of the governor's mansion.

== Territories ==
=== Northern Mariana Islands ===
Northern Marina Islands election
| Party | Candidate | Votes | % |
|---|---|---|---|
| Democratic | Froilan Tenorio | {{{votes}}} | 100% |
