= Victor Hocog =

Northern Marianan politician

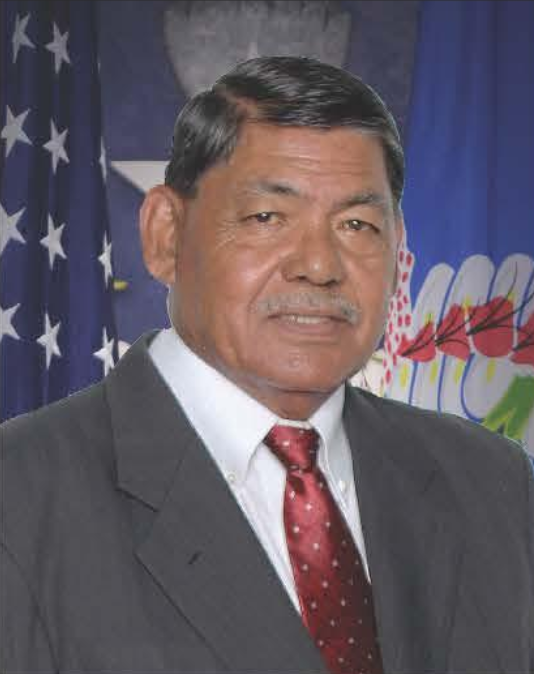
- Hocog as Lieutenant Governor

President of the Northern Mariana Islands Senate
- In office January 14, 2019 – January 11, 2021
- Preceded by: Arnold Palacios
- Succeeded by: Jude Hofschneider
- In office January 12, 2015 – December 29, 2015
- Preceded by: Ralph Torres
- Succeeded by: Frank Borja

11th Lieutenant Governor of the Northern Mariana Islands
- In office December 29, 2015 – January 14, 2019
- Governor: Ralph Torres
- Preceded by: Ralph Torres
- Succeeded by: Arnold Palacios

Personal details
- Born: Victor Borja Hocog; September 11, 1953 (age 73) Mariana Islands, Trust Territory of the Pacific Islands
- Party: Republican (2009–present); Independent (before 2009)
- Spouse: Villa Hocog

Victor Borja Hocog (born September 11, 1953) is a Northern Marianan politician. He served as the President of the Northern Mariana Islands Senate from January 14, 2019 to January 11, 2021, and previously from January 12, 2015 to December 29, 2015. He also served as the 11th Lieutenant Governor of the Northern Mariana Islands from December 29, 2015 to January 14, 2019. He is a Republican.

== Background and personal life ==
Hocog lives in Rota with his wife, Villa M. Hocog.

In 2013, the Northern Mariana Islands Superior Court found Hocog and his wife Villa liable for unpaid rent on a piece of land on Rota. The Hocogs had not paid rent since 2009. The Hocogs were order to $292,049 in overdue rent, interest, and attorney's costs.

== Political career ==
=== Early political career ===
Hocog was elected to the Northern Mariana Islands House of Representatives in the 1983 general election. He was reelected in 1985. Hocog served as Chairman of the Committee on Health, Education and Welfare throughout his two-term tenure in the House of Representatives. In the 1987 election, Hocog chose to forgo running for reelection to the House and instead run to represent Rota in the CNMI Senate. He was defeated by Republican candidate Paul Manglona. In 1989, he was chosen by Froilan Cruz Tenorio to be his running mate for the 1989 gubernatorial election. The Tenorio-Hocog ticket lost to Republicans Larry De Leon Guerrero and Benjamin Manglona. Hocog also unsuccessfully ran against Prudencio T. Manglona for mayor of Rota in November 1989.

=== Later political career ===
Hocog ran for mayor of Rota in 2005 and 2009. In the 2007 election, Hocog was once again elected to the Northern Mariana Islands House of Representatives. In 2008, Hocog advocated in favor of a bill to require the Commonwealth Utilities Corporation to sell its power system for $250 million. The bill prohibited requests for proposal in the procurement process in order to prevent protests. Governor Benigno Fitial vetoed the bill, saying it could lead to higher utility rates because the private company that would buy the power system would recover its selling cost by passing them on to utility consumers. Hocog was one of many in the House of Representatives who successfully overrode the governor's veto.

In 2008, Hocog supported a bill that would allow certain foreign workers to apply for a resident foreign national entry permit. The bill would make a foreign worker eligible if the individual had lived legally in the Northern Marianas Islands for at least five years and has good character.

In 2009, Hocog introduced a bill to establish a set of procedures to seize land from private individuals in order to build a public highway.

Hocog supported a bill to legalize casino gaming in Saipan in 2012. The bill did not advance past the Senate.

In 2015, Hocog sponsored a bill to establish the crime of electronic impersonation. The bill would make it a crime to hack someone's profile on the internet or to create a fake profile on the internet with the intent to harm, intimidate, or attack other people.

He rejoined the Senate in the 2018 general election. He did not run for reelection in 2022. The election for Rota's two senate seats was won by Dennis C. Mendiola, a special assistant for Department of Homeland Security and Donald M. Manglona, a member of the Northern Mariana Islands House of Representatives.

=== Lieutenant governor ===
Incumbent Governor Eloy Inos died of complications after open heart surgery on December 28, 2015. In accordance with the Constitution of the Northern Mariana Islands, Lieutenant Governor of the Northern Mariana Islands Ralph Torres became the Governor of the Northern Mariana Islands and Hocog became lieutenant governor. Hocog was sworn in as lieutenant governor on December 29, 2015. Hocog announced in November 2017 that he would not seek re-election in 2018, and would instead seek to return to the Senate.

== See also ==
- Lieutenant Governor of the Northern Mariana Islands

Political offices
Preceded by Ralph Torres	President of the Northern Mariana Islands Senate; 2015	Succeeded by Frank Borja
Preceded by Ralph Torres	Lieutenant Governor of the Northern Mariana Islands; 2015–2019	Succeeded by Arnold Palacios
Preceded by Arnold Palacios	President of the Northern Mariana Islands Senate; 2019–2021	Succeeded by Jude Hofschneider
