= Francisco Ada =

Northern Mariana Islands politician

Francisco C. Ada
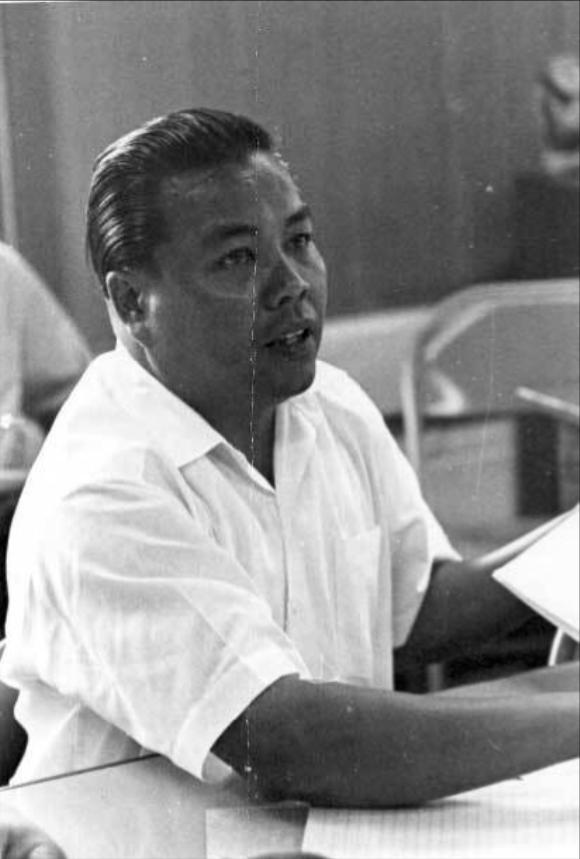
- Ada while serving as DistAd of the Marianas

1st Lieutenant Governor of the Northern Mariana Islands
- In office January 9, 1978 – January 11, 1982
- Governor: Carlos S. Camacho
- Preceded by: Position created
- Succeeded by: Pedro Agulto Tenorio

Personal details
- Born: Francisco Castro Ada; September 26, 1934 Saipan, Mariana Islands, South Pacific Mandate
- Died: March 2, 2010 (aged 75) Garapan, Saipan, Northern Mariana Islands
- Party: Democratic
- Spouse: Ines Seman Ada
- Education: University of Hawaii at Manoa

Francisco Castro Ada (September 26, 1934 – March 2, 2010) was a Northern Mariana Islander politician who served as the first lieutenant governor of the Northern Mariana Islands from January 9, 1978 to January 11, 1982, under Carlos S. Camacho, the territory's first governor.

Ada is credited with spearheading the construction of much of the modern infrastructure in the Northern Mariana Islands, including Francisco C. Ada/Saipan International Airport, the Commonwealth Ports Authority, and the Northern Marianas College.

== Early life ==
Francisco Ada was born on September 26, 1934. He received a bachelor's degree in political science from the University of Hawaii at Manoa.

== Trust Territory of the Pacific Islands ==
In 1969, Ada, who was 35 years old at the time, became the district administrator of the Trust Territory of the Pacific Islands. This was the highest-ranking office in the Northern Mariana Islands at the time.

Much of Ada's efforts as an administrator focused on the potential of air travel as a tool of economic growth in the Mariana Islands. He laid the groundwork for the modern Saipan International Airport by acting on the advice of airport consultant Leigh Fisher and accepting grants made available through the National Airport Airways Development Act.

Ada spearheaded the creation of an "airline technical committee", which promoted cooperation between the government and the private sector to promote the creation of the new airport. During this period, Ada established the Mariana Islands Airport Authority, which is now called the Commonwealth Ports Authority.

Ada next became the deputy resident commissioner to the Northern Marianas Islands in 1976. He also served as the delegate for the Trust Territory of the Pacific Islands government to the South Pacific Commission, assistant district administrator, a member of the Saipan Municipal Congress, and a member of the Mariana Islands District Legislature.

== Lieutenant governor ==
In 1978, the Northern Mariana Islands became a commonwealth in political union with the United States, resulting in a new constitution and an elected governor's office. In 1977, Carlos S. Camacho and Francisco Ada were elected the Northern Mariana Islands' first governor and lieutenant governor respectively. Governor Camacho would later call Ada "a good man" and "very loyal" during their tenure in office. Ada served as lieutenant governor, leaving office on January 11, 1982. He was succeeded as by Pedro Agulto Tenorio.

== Post-Lt. Governor ==
=== Later career ===
Within the private sector, Ada worked as the general manager and vice president of Triple J Enterprises Inc.

On October 14, 2002, former Governor Juan N. Babauta signed Saipan Local Law 13-10, which renamed Saipan International Airport as Francisco C. Ada/Saipan International Airport in honor of Ada. At the time of the signing former Governor Babauta praised Ada's contributions to the airport saying, "There is no doubt that due to the Honorable Francisco C. Ada's tireless contributions in the planning, development and completion of the Saipan International Airport, the Commonwealth's economic future was forever transformed." The new, modern airport was dedicated and renamed in honor of Ada in 2005. Ada told the NMI media during the dedication ceremony, "But the name was secondary to what the effort stands for, which is working together with the federal government [to achieve our goals]."

=== Death ===
Francisco Ada died on March 2, 2010, at Commonwealth Health Center in Garapan, Saipan, at the age of 75. Ada had suffered from a lengthy illness. He was survived by his wife, Ines Seman Ada, and their seven children, many of whom have held positions in CNMI public life. His children are - MaryLou Ada, former director of the former Commonwealth Development Authority; Eloise Furey, former member of the Northern Marianas College Board of Regents; Lillian Tenorio, an attorney; Esther Ada, internal auditor of the Northern Mariana Islands Retirement Fund; Frank C. Ada Jr., chief of classification and compensation for the commonwealth's Office of Personnel Management; Dr. Norma Ada and Luciana Schubert.

Ada received a state funeral, which is required for all top government officials, including governors and lieutenant governors, by the Constitution of the Northern Mariana Islands. Ada's son, Frank Ada Jr., told the Saipan Tribune that a state funeral was "fitting for what my father contributed to the government of the Northern Marianas and Micronesia." Lieutenant Governor Eloy Inos stated that Ada's state funeral was "in recognition of his dedicated service to our people as our first lieutenant governor." Inos also ordered all American and Northern Mariana Islands flags lowered to half staff. Both the House of Representatives and the Senate adopted separate resolutions praising Ada's contributions to the political and social sectors of the Northern Mariana Islands since 1976, when it became a commonwealth.

Ada's state funeral was held on Wednesday, March 10, 2010, at the Pedro P. Tenorio Multi-Purpose Center in Susupe, Saipan. The funeral was attended by four of the Northern Mariana Islands' governors - Carlos S. Camacho and his wife, former First Lady Lourdes Camacho; Pedro P. Tenorio, and his wife, Sophie; Juan N. Babauta and current governor Benigno Fitial. Other dignitaries included judges, mayors, Cabinet members and local officials. Ada left behind 16 Grandchildren, 1 Greatgranddaughter, seven children and his wife Ines. A very well known family in the Marianas, the Ada's continue to service the community, with Ada's grandchildren succeeding in off island competitions.

Afterwards, a Roman Catholic Requiem Mass, officiated by Bishop Tomas Aguon Camacho of the Diocese of Chalan Kanoa, and nine priests was held at the Mount Carmel Cathedral in Chalan Kanoa. Burial took place at Chalan Kanoa Cemetery.

Political offices
Preceded by Office established	Lieutenant Governor of the Northern Mariana Islands; 1978–1982	Succeeded by Pedro Agulto Tenorio
