= Joseph S. Inos =

North Marianan politician

Joe Inos

President of the Senate of the Northern Mariana Islands
- In office 1990–1992
- Preceded by: Benjamin Mangloña
- Succeeded by: Juan Demapan

Personal details
- Born: Joseph Songao Inos; December 31, 1947 (age 78) Rota, Northern Mariana Islands
- Party: Republican (before 1993, 1997–2005, 2013–2018); Democratic (1993–1997, 2018–present); Covenant (2005–2013)
- Relatives: Eloy Inos (brother)
- Education: Chaffey College (AS); Wayne State University (BS)

Joseph Songao Inos was born on December 31, 1947. He is a politician from the Northern Mariana Islands. He has served as a member of the Northern Mariana Islands Senate and as the Mayor of Rota.

== Early life ==
Inos was born on December 31, 1947, in Rota. He was the brother of Governor Eloy Inos. He earned an associate's degree at Chaffey College and a bachelor of arts degree from Wayne State University. In 1976, he married Diane B Masga.

== Political career ==
Inos was elected to the Northern Mariana Islands Senate in the 1978 general election. During the 1st Commonwealth Legislature, he was a sponsor of the bill that set up the judicial branch of the Northern Mariana Islands. He then served sixteen years in the CNMI Senate representing Rota. He served as the floor leader in the 4th and 6th Legislature. During the 7th and 8th Commonwealth Legislatures, Inos was the President of the Senate.

He then served two non-consecutive terms as the Mayor of Rota. Inos announced his candidacy for Governor of the Northern Mariana Islands on the Democratic ticket on January 19, 2018. Shortly after, he withdrew from the race on February 7, 2018, citing a lack of unified support from his predominantly-Republican family, who sided with his brother's running mate and successor as Governor, Ralph Torres.

Political offices
Preceded by Benjamin Mangloña	President of the Senate of the Northern Mariana Islands; 1990–1992	Succeeded by Juan Demapan
Party political offices
Preceded by Tofila Deleon Guerrero	Democratic nominee for Governor of the Northern Mariana Islands; Withdrew; 2018	Succeeded by Juan Babauta; Endorsed
