= Lorenzo I. De Leon Guerrero =

Northern Marianan politician

Larry Guerrero

3rd Governor of the Northern Mariana Islands
- In office January 8, 1990 – January 10, 1994
- Lieutenant: Benjamin T. Mangloña
- Preceded by: Pedro P. Tenorio
- Succeeded by: Froilan C. Tenorio

President of the Northern Mariana Islands Senate
- In office January 9, 1978 – January 14, 1980
- Preceded by: Position established
- Succeeded by: Pedro P. Tenorio

Personal details
- Born: Lorenzo Iglecias De Leon Guerrero; January 25, 1935 Saipan, Mariana Islands, South Seas Mandate
- Died: October 6, 2006 (aged 71) Saipan, Northern Mariana Islands
- Party: Republican
- Spouse: Matilde Salas Villagomez
- Children: 13

Lorenzo Iglecias "Larry" De Leon Guerrero (January 25, 1935 – October 6, 2006) was a Northern Mariana Islander politician who served as the third governor of the Northern Mariana Islands from 1990 to 1994 and the first president of the Northern Mariana Islands Senate from 1978 to 1980. He was a member of the CNMI Republican Party.

== Early life and business career ==
Guerrero was born on January 25, 1935, to his parents Pedro Taitingfong Deleon Guerrero and Carmen Celis Iglecias of Saipan. He was one of a handful of local students selected to attend Navy Dependent High School. After the high school closed down, Guerrero worked as a power plant operator, then a lineman, and then at Saipan Shipping. He eventually rose to become the president of Saipan Shipping. After leaving the CNMI Senate, he owned and managed the Commonwealth Maritime Agency in Saipan until 1989 when he won the governorship.

== Political career ==
De Leon Guerrero served in a variety of elected positions in the Trust Territory of the Pacific Islands and the Commonwealth of the Northern Mariana Islands. He chaired the Northern Mariana Islands Republican Party from 1983 to 1985.

=== District Legislature ===
In the 1960s, he joined the Progressive Party, which would become the Territorial Party, and finally become the modern Republican Party. In 1967, while in San Francisco, he ran for the Marianas District Legislature. He was unsuccessful. He was elected to the District Legislature in 1971 and reelected in 1975. He was the minority leader for the Territorial Party. He voted for the creation of the Marianas Political Status Commission and was a participant in the subsequent political education efforts.

=== Commonwealth Legislature ===
In 1978, he was elected as one of three senators from Saipan alongside Herman R. Guerrero and Pedro P. Tenorio. He served as the first President of the Northern Mariana Islands Senate. He did not run for reelection in 1980.

=== Governor ===
In 1989, Guerrero and his running mate, Benjamin Manglona were elected to the governorship against the Democratic ticket of Froilan Tenorio and Victor B. Hocog. In the 1993 gubernatorial election, Guerrero and Manglona lost reelection to Froilan Tenorio and Jesus Borja with 4,144 votes to the Tenorio-Borja ticket's 5,197 votes. In 1997, Guerrero unsuccessfully ran for governor with running mate, Rita Inos, who became the first woman to run for lieutenant governor of the Northern Mariana Islands at the time.

== Personal life ==
Guerrero died on October 6, 2006, after a long illness. A state funeral was held. Guerrero, the first of the CNMI's elected governors to pass away, was survived by his wife, ten children, and about forty grandchildren and great-grandchildren. The funeral mass were held at the Kristo Rai Church and Nuestra Senora de la Paz Chapel. He was buried at the Mount Carmel Cemetery (Chalan Kanoa Cemetery) in Saipan. Guerrero was married to Matilde Salas Villagomez Deleon Guerrero and had thirteen children, Aida, Joaquin, Margarita, Frances, Gloria, Emiliana, Dolores, Lorenza, Lorenzo Jr., Magdalena, Raymond, Patricia, and Edith.

Party political offices
| Preceded by Pedro Tenorio | Republican nominee for Governor of the Northern Mariana Islands; 1989, 1993 | Succeeded by Pedro Tenorio |
Political offices
| Preceded by Pedro Tenorio | Governor of the Northern Mariana Islands; 1990–1994 | Succeeded by Froilan Tenorio |
