= Pedro Agulto Tenorio =

Northern Marianan politician

Pete Tenorio
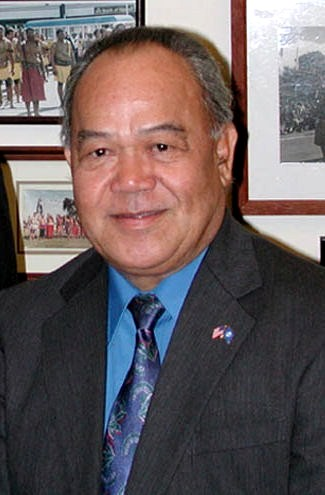

4th Resident Representative of the Northern Mariana Islands
- In office January 14, 2002 – January 3, 2009
- Preceded by: Juan Babauta
- Succeeded by: Gregorio Sablan (Delegate)

2nd Lieutenant Governor of the Northern Mariana Islands
- In office January 11, 1982 – January 8, 1990
- Governor: Pedro Pangelinan Tenorio
- Preceded by: Francisco Ada
- Succeeded by: Benjamin Manglona

Personal details
- Born: August 8, 1941 (age 85) Saipan, Mariana Islands, South Seas Mandate (now Northern Mariana Islands)
- Party: Republican
- Education: University of Hawaii, Manoa (BS, MS)

Pedro Agulto Tenorio (born August 8, 1941), who is often known as Pete A. Tenorio, is a Northern Marianan politician. He served as the fourth Resident representative of the Northern Mariana Islands to the United States from January 14, 2002 to January 3, 2009. A member of the Republican Party, he was elected to the office first in November 2001 and again in November 2005. He served as the second lieutenant governor of the Northern Mariana Islands from January 11, 1982 to January 8, 1990.

== Early life ==
Tenorio attended the University of Hawaiʻi earning a bachelor's degree in geology and returned to Saipan to teach. He later earned a master's degree in hydrology via the East–West Center and took a job as a hydrologist for the Trust Territory of the Pacific Islands government.

== Political career ==
In 1972, Tenorio was elected as an independent to the Congress of Micronesia Senate. He was a member of the Marianas Political Status Commission and a signatory to the Covenant to Establish a Commonwealth of the Northern Mariana Islands in Political Union with the United States of America. In the 1981 election, Tenorio was elected Lieutenant Governor on the Republican ticket, alongside his cousin and Republican gubernatorial nominee Pedro P. Tenorio.

== Washington Representative ==
In the 2001 election, Tenorio defeated Democratic nominee Agnes McPhetres and Covenant nominee Herman R. Deleon Guerrero to serve as the Resident Representative. The position of Resident Representative, also known locally as "Washington Representative", was established by Article V of the Constitution of the Northern Mariana Islands, and the term of office was four years. The CNMI Resident Representative maintained an office in Washington, D.C. and his expenses were funded by the CNMI government.

He took office as resident representative on January 14, 2002. In 2005, Tenorio was reelected against Covenant Party nominee Juan Sablan Demapan.

Tenorio was the CNMI's fourth and final Resident Representative. This office was replaced by a nonvoting delegate in the United States Congress in January 2009. Established in 2008 with the enactment of Pub. L. 110–229 (text) (PDF), the first election for the congressional delegate was held on November 4, 2008. Tenorio was the Republican nominee; however, he lost by 357 votes to Gregorio C. Sablan, an independent.

Political offices
Preceded by Francisco Ada	Lieutenant Governor of the Northern Mariana Islands; 1982–1990	Succeeded by Benjamin Manglona
U.S. House of Representatives
Preceded by Juan Babauta	Resident Representative of the Northern Mariana Islands; 2002–2009	Succeeded by Gregorio Sablan as Delegate from the Northern Mariana Islands
