= As Lito, Saipan =

Coordinates: 15°07′38″N 145°41′53″E

As Lito is a village on Saipan in the Northern Mariana Islands. It is located in the center of the island. It uses UTC+10:00 And its highest point is 138 feet. It has 767 inhabitants (2020 census).
