= Jesus Borja =

Northern Mariana Islands politician and lawyer

Jesse Borja

Chair of the Northern Mariana Islands Democratic Party
- Acting
- In office January 1, 2014 – February 22, 2014
- Preceded by: Edward Manibusan
- Succeeded by: Benjamin Cepeda
- In office by July 8, 2011 – April 6, 2012
- Preceded by: ???
- Succeeded by: Edward Manibusan

4th Lieutenant Governor of the Northern Mariana Islands
- In office January 10, 1994 – January 12, 1998
- Governor: Froilan Tenorio
- Preceded by: Benjamin Manglona
- Succeeded by: Jesus Sablan

Associate Justice of the Northern Mariana Islands Supreme Court
- In office 1989–1993
- Appointed by: Teno Tenorio
- Preceded by: Position established
- Succeeded by: Pedro Atalig

Personal details
- Born: Jesus Camacho Borja; September 14, 1948 (age 77) Saipan, Mariana Islands, Trust Territory of the Pacific Islands
- Party: Democratic (before 1997, 2001–present); Independent (1997–2001)
- Spouse: Mary Anne Mangloña Pangelinan
- Children: 6
- Education: Rockhurst University (BA); Georgetown University (JD)

Jesus Camacho "Jesse" Borja (born September 14, 1948) is a Northern Mariana Islander politician and lawyer who served as the fourth lieutenant governor of the Northern Mariana Islands from January 10, 1994 until January 12, 1998 under former Democratic Governor Froilan Tenorio.

== Biography ==
=== Early life ===
Borja was born on September 14, 1948, to Antonia Sablan Camacho and Ricardo Tudela Borja. He married his wife, Mary Anne Mangloña Pangelinan, in July 1972. They have six children - Dora, Leticia, Jesse, Richard, Amanda and Emmanuel.

He received a Juris Doctor in 1974 from the Georgetown University Law Center in Washington D.C.

=== Career ===
Borja served as an associate justice of the Northern Mariana Islands Supreme Court from 1989 until 1993. He has also worked as a lawyer in a law practice for several years.

In 1993, Democratic gubernatorial candidate Froilan Tenorio chose Borja as his running mate for the 1993 election. Tenorio and Borja were elected as the governor and lieutenant governor of the Northern Mariana Islands in the gubernatorial election. Borja was sworn in as the 4th lieutenant governor of the Northern Mariana Islands on January 10, 1994.

After Tenorio declared he would not seek re-election in 1997, Borja announced his campaign to succeed him. Tenorio subsequently changed his mind, resulting in a three-way race. Ultimately, the nominee of the Republican Party, former governor Pedro P. Tenorio, won the election easily with 45.6% of the vote. Democratic support was split between Governor Tenorio and Lieutenant Governor Borja. Tenorio received 27.4% of the vote and Borja received 27%. Borja left office on January 12, 1998 and was succeeded as Lt. Governor by Jesus Sablan.

In the 2001 gubernatorial election campaign, Borja announced his candidacy for Governor of the Northern Mariana Islands, choosing running mate Bridget Ichihara. His opponents in the election were Republican Juan Babauta, Covenant Party candidate Benigno Fitial and Democratic former Governor Froilan Tenorio. Borja lost the 2001 election, coming in third behind winner Juan Babauta and Benigno Fitial. Babauta and his running mate, Diego Benavente, won the election with 44.9 of the vote, Fitial came in second with 25.5%, Borja placed third with 18.0% and Tenorio finished last with 11.5% of the total vote.

=== 2010 Congressional campaign ===
In April 2010, Borja announced his candidacy as a Democrat for Delegate of the Northern Mariana Islands to the United States House of Representatives in the 2010 election. In a letter of intent to the chairmen of the CNMI Democratic Party Jesse T. Torres, Borja wrote, "I am highly qualified to fill the position of Washington delegate. In particular, my legal education at Georgetown University, my experience as a justice of our Supreme Court, my experience as lieutenant governor, and my experience as a member of the NMI Commission on Federal Laws make me uniquely qualified to be the CNMI's Washington delegate." Borja officially filed to run for the seat on July 28, 2010. Borja challenged the incumbent Gregorio "Killi" Sablan. Joe Camacho of the Covenant Party and Republican Juan Babauta, who served as governor from 2002 until 2006, also sought the seat. Sablan won re-election against all three challengers.

=== Democratic Party Chair ===
Borja was acting chair of the Northern Mariana Islands Democratic Party twice: first by July 8, 2011 until April 6, 2012 when Edward Manibusan was elected as permanent chair, and then from January 1, 2014 to February 22, 2014 in between Manibusan's resignation to run as the first elected Attorney General of the Northern Mariana Islands until Benjamin Cepeda's election. Shortly thereafter, Cepeda resigned on May 19, 2014 to join Juan Babauta's 2014 election independent campaign slate, with Rosiky Camacho initially becoming acting chair until he permanently held the post.

Legal offices
New office	Associate Justice of the Northern Mariana Islands Supreme Court; 1989–1993	Succeeded by Pedro Atalig
Political offices
Preceded by Benjamin Manglona	Lieutenant Governor of the Northern Mariana Islands; 1994–1998	Succeeded by Jesus Sablan
Party political offices
Preceded by Froilan Tenorio	Democratic nominee for Governor of the Northern Mariana Islands; 2001	Succeeded by Froilan Tenorio
Preceded by ???	Chair of the Northern Mariana Islands Democratic Party; Acting; 2011–2012	Succeeded by Edward Manibusan
Preceded by Edward Manibusan	Chair of the Northern Mariana Islands Democratic Party; Acting; 2014	Succeeded by Benjamin Cepeda
