= Diego Benavente =

Northern Mariana Islands politician

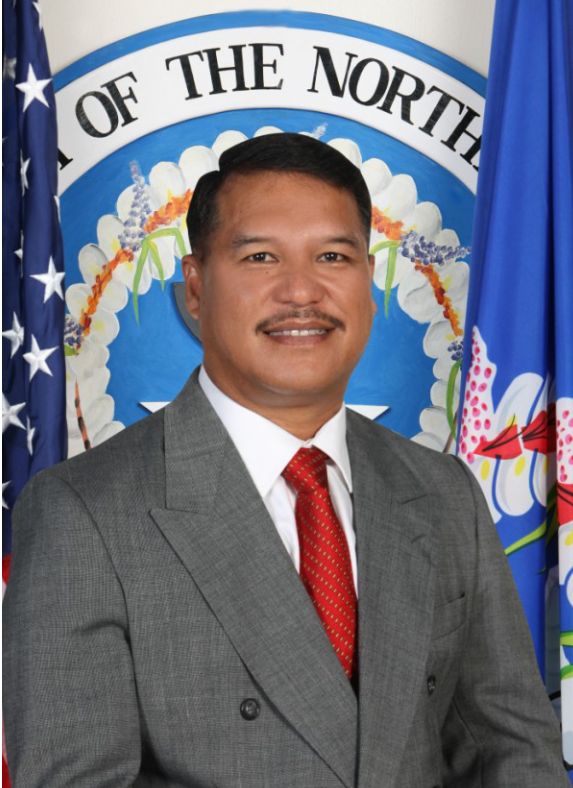

Chair of the Northern Mariana Islands Republican Party
- In office August 28, 2023 – November 20, 2024
- Preceded by: Candace Celis
- Succeeded by: Ramon Tebuteb

6th Lieutenant Governor of the Northern Mariana Islands
- In office January 14, 2002 – January 9, 2006
- Governor: Juan Babauta
- Preceded by: Jesus Sablan
- Succeeded by: Timothy Villagomez

8th Speaker of the Northern Mariana Islands House of Representatives
- In office January 10, 1994 – January 10, 2000
- Preceded by: Thomas P. Villagomez
- Succeeded by: Benigno Fitial

Personal details
- Born: Diego Tenorio Benavente; April 21, 1959 (age 66) Saipan, Mariana Islands, Trust Territory of the Pacific Islands (now Northern Mariana Islands)
- Died: November 20, 2025 As Lito, Saipan
- Party: Republican
- Spouse: Vicky Iriarte
- Education: College of Southern Idaho

Diego Tenorio Benavente (April 21, 1959-November 20, 2025) was a Northern Mariana Islander politician who served as the sixth lieutenant governor of the Northern Mariana Islands from January 14, 2002 to January 9, 2006, under former Governor Juan Babauta.

== Biography ==
Diego Tenorio Benavente was born April 21, 1959. His uncle was Governor Pedro Pangelinan Tenorio. He graduated from Carmel High School in 1977. He then attended the College of Southern Idaho receiving an education in electrical engineering. Upon returning from Idaho, he started his own business. Benavente first ran for election in 1987, when he narrowly lost his bid for election to the Northern Mariana Islands House of Representatives in Precinct II by just six votes. However, Benavente was elected to the House in his second campaign in 1989. He served in the House for six consecutive terms, including three terms as the Speaker of the House. He left the House in 2000 to run for Lieutenant Governor in 2001.

Benavente was elected Lieutenant Governor of the Northern Mariana Islands as the running mate of Juan Babauta in the 2001 gubernatorial election. In the 2005 election, the Babauta-Benavente ticket finished third of four candidates with Benigno Fitial and his running mate Timothy Villagomez of the Covenant Party winning the election.

Benavente announced his candidacy for Governor in the 2009 election on December 11, 2008. However, Benavente dropped out of the race in February 2009 leaving two candidates - Heinz Hofschneider and Juan Babauta - in the race for the Republican nomination.

Benavente was again elected to the CNMI House of Representatives in 2007. He is currently serves as the Minority Leader of the Northern Mariana Islands House of Representatives as of April 2011.

Benavente was elected president of the CNMI Republican Party on August 28, 2023. He resigned the position effective November 20, 2024. Former Representative Ramon Angailen Tebuteb succeeded Benavente as the party's chairman.

Benavente died November 20, 2025 from acute leukemia his home in As Lito.

Political offices
| Preceded by Thomas Pangelinan Villagomez | Speaker of the Northern Mariana Islands House of Representatives; 1994–2000 | Succeeded by Benigno Fitial |
| Preceded by Jesus Sablan | Lieutenant Governor of the Northern Mariana Islands; 2002–2006 | Succeeded by Timothy Villagomez |
Party political offices
| Preceded by Candace Celis | Chair of the Northern Mariana Islands Republican Party; 2023–2024 | Succeeded by Ramon Tebuteb |
