= Joaquin G. Adriano =

Northern Mariana Islander politician (1959–2009)

Joaquin Gillimon Adriano (January 29, 1959 ― January 22, 2009) was a Northern Mariana Islander politician who served in both houses of the Northern Mariana Islands Commonwealth Legislature.

== Biography ==
Joaquin Gillimon Adriano was born January 29, 1959 to Jose Gusman Adriano and Magarita Gillimon Adriano. After graduating Marianas High School he became a police officer.

He served on the Tinian and Aguiguan Municipal Council. From 1994-1997, he served as a member of the Northern Mariana Islands House of Representatives from Precinct #5. In 1997 general election, Adriano was elected to the Northern Mariana Islands Senate. He served as its president during the 14th Commonwealth Legislature. He was the first Senate President from Tinian. He did not run for reelection in 2005. In the 2005 election, Adriano was an unsuccessful candidate for the mayoralty of Tinian Municipality, losing to candidate Jose Pangelinan San Nicolas with 522 votes to San Nicolas' 560 votes. Adriano died on January 22, 2009 at his home in Koblerville, Saipan.
