= 1985 United States gubernatorial elections =

- November 5, 1985

3 governorships 2 states; 1 territory
	Majority party	Minority party
Party	Democratic	Republican
Seats before	34	16
Seats after	34	16
Seat change	Steady	Steady
Seats up	1	1
Seats won	1	1
- Republican hold Democratic hold

United States gubernatorial elections were held on November 5, 1985, in two states and one territory. Both seats remained in their respective parties' control, as Democrat Gerald Baliles held the open seat in Virginia, while Republican incumbent Thomas Kean was reelected in New Jersey.

== Election results ==
State	Incumbent	Party	First elected	Result	Candidates
New Jersey	Thomas Kean	Republican	1981	Incumbent re-elected.	✓ Thomas Kean (Republican) 69.6%; Peter Shapiro (Democratic) 29.3%
Virginia	Chuck Robb	Democratic	1981	Incumbent term-limited. New governor elected. Democratic hold.	✓ Gerald Baliles (Democratic) 55.2%; Wyatt B. Durrette Jr. (Republican) 44.8%

== New Jersey ==
1985 New Jersey gubernatorial election
- November 5, 1985
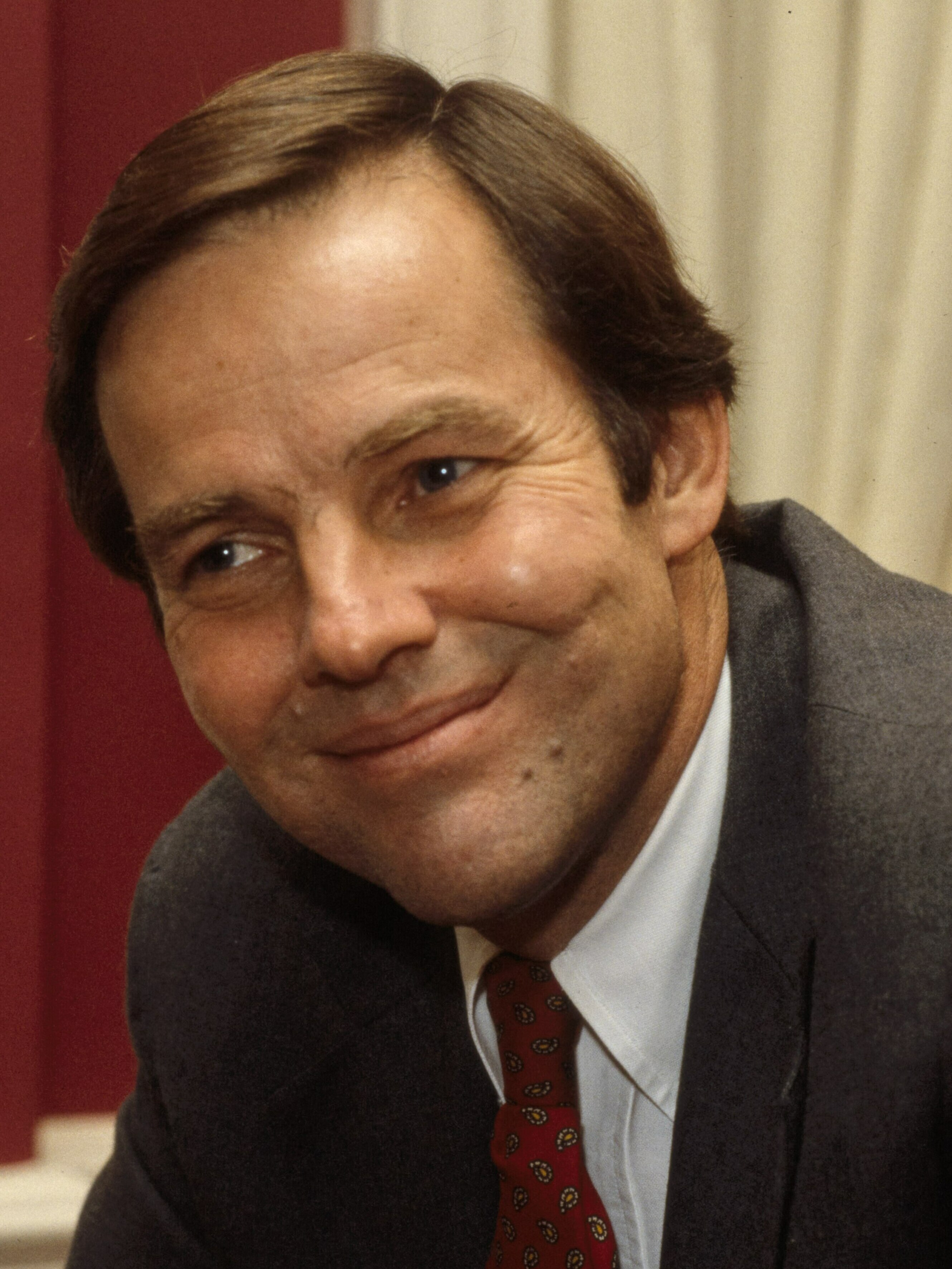

Nominee	Thomas Kean	Peter Shapiro
Party	Republican	Democratic
Popular vote	1,372,631	578,402
Percentage	69.6%	29.3%
- Kean: 50–60% 60–70% 70–80%
Governor before election
Thomas Kean
Republican
Elected Governor
Thomas Kean
Republican

The 1985 New Jersey gubernatorial election was held on November 5, 1985. Incumbent Republican Governor Thomas Kean won a landslide re-election against the Democratic candidate, Essex County Executive Peter Shapiro. As of 2026, Kean's is the largest margin in terms of percentage and raw votes in all New Jersey gubernatorial elections. Kean was the first Republican to be re-elected governor since 1949, and the first Republican to ever win two four-year terms.

== Virginia ==
1985 Virginia gubernatorial election
- November 5, 1985
- Turnout: 53.0% (voting eligible)
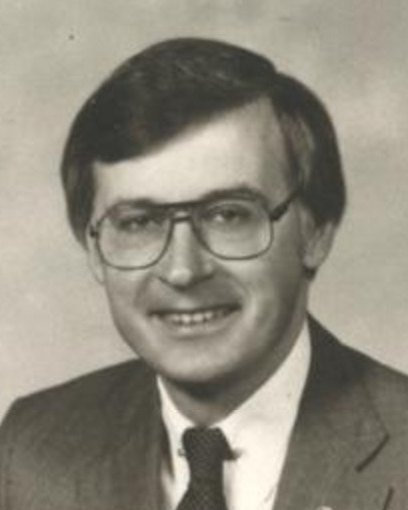

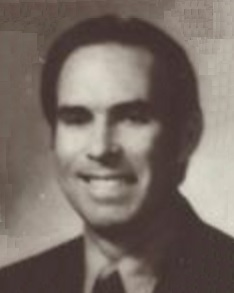
Nominee	Gerald Baliles	Wyatt Durrette
Party	Democratic	Republican
Popular vote	741,438	601,652
Percentage	55.2%	44.8%
- County and independent city results Baliles: 50–60% 60–70% 70–80% Durrette: 50–60% 60–70%
Governor before election
Charles Robb
Democratic
Elected Governor
Gerald Baliles
Democratic

In the 1985 Virginia gubernatorial election, incumbent Governor Chuck Robb, a Democrat, was unable to seek re-election due to term limits. Jerry Baliles, the Attorney General of Virginia, was nominated by the Democratic Party to run against the Republican nominee, Wyatt B. Durrette.
