= Carlos S. Camacho =

Governor of the Northern Mariana Islands

Carlos Camacho
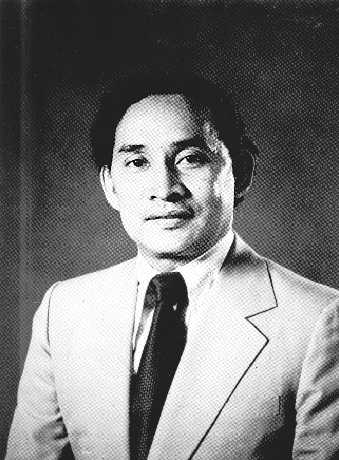

1st Governor of the Northern Mariana Islands
- In office January 9, 1978 – January 11, 1982
- Lieutenant: Francisco Ada
- Preceded by: Erwin Canham (Resident Commissioner)
- Succeeded by: Pedro Tenorio

Personal details
- Born: Carlos Sablan Camacho; February 27, 1937 (age 89) Saipan, Mariana Islands, South Pacific Mandate
- Party: Democratic
- Spouse: Lourdes Camacho
- Education: Fiji School of Medicine (MBBS); University of Hawaii, Manoa (MPH)

Carlos Sablan Camacho (born February 27, 1937) is a retired Northern Mariana Islander politician and medical doctor. He served as the first governor of the Northern Mariana Islands from January 9, 1978, to January 11, 1982. He is a member of the Democratic Party of the Northern Mariana Islands (DPNMI).

== Early life and education ==
He was born to Luis Taimanao Camacho and Ramona Reyes Sablan, as one of eleven children. He was educated in Saipan before being recruited to attend Pacific Islands Central School in Truk. After high school, he attended the Fiji School of Medicine where he learned basic medicine and dentistry.

== Career ==
He practiced medicine until 1967, when he was elected to the Congress of Micronesia. He served as the Pacific islands' chief medical officer of public health from 1969 to 1977. He was also president of the Saipan Democratic Party from 1975 to 1977. In 1976, he was appointed to the Northern Marianas Constitutional Convention. Dr. Camacho is married to Lourdes Camacho and they have seven children.

== Governorship ==
On December 10, 1977, Camacho defeated Saipan businessman and Republican candidate Jose C. Tenorio by a narrow margin to become the first elected Governor of the Northern Mariana Islands. He was inaugurated as Governor on January 9, 1978. He served a single term from 1978 to 1982.

On June 26, 1981, both Camacho and Senator Herman Rogolifoi Guerrero claimed the Democratic nomination amidst a contested convention. After an unsuccessful lawsuit, in which the court declared Guerrero the rightful Democratic nominee, Camacho formed the Commonwealth Popular Democratic Party to continue to contest the election. His running mate was Lorenzo Deleon Guerrero Cabrera.

In that year's general election, Camacho lost reelection to CNMI Senate President and Republican candidate Pedro Tenorio, finishing second in the three-way race with the Democratic ticket finishing third.

=== Taisacan v. Camacho ===
In 1980, the CNMI legislature passed a budget that would have appropriated over $1.5 million in federal money for capital improvements on the island of Rota. Camacho vetoed this portion of the budget, calling it excessive and inequitable. Leon Taisacan, a Rota resident, then sued Camacho, claiming that his veto violated the terms of the Covenant between the United States and the CNMI. A district court granted summary judgement in favor of Camacho, and then the United States Court of Appeals for the Ninth Circuit dismissed the lawsuit on the grounds that Taisacan did not have standing to sue, as he was not specifically injured by the veto.

== Post-governorship ==
After the election, Camacho rejoined the Democratic Party when the Democratic Party and Commonwealth Popular Democratic Party reunified on August 27, 1982. In 1985, Camacho, as the Democratic nominee, lost in a rematch with Tenorio.

He was elected to the 1995 Constitutional Convention. At the convention, he served as the chair of the Saipan delegation and the Legal Subcommittee. He was defeated for the convention's presidency by a single vote.

Party political offices
First	Democratic nominee for Governor of the Northern Mariana Islands; 1977	Succeeded by Herman Guerrero
Preceded by Herman Guerrero	Democratic nominee for Governor of the Northern Mariana Islands; 1985	Succeeded by Froilan Tenorio
Political offices
Preceded by Erwin Canham as Resident Commissioner of the Northern Mariana Islands	Governor of the Northern Mariana Islands; 1978–1982	Succeeded by Pedro Tenorio
