= Edward Pangelinan =

American politician (1941–2023)

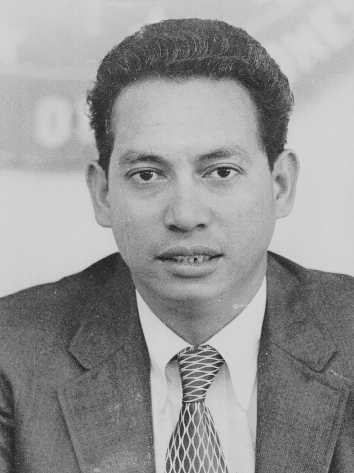
- Pangelinan while a member of the Congress of Micronesia

Resident Representative of the Northern Mariana Islands
- In office January 9, 1978 – January 1984
- Preceded by: Position established
- Succeeded by: Froilan Tenorio

Personal details
- Born: Edward De Leon Guerrero Pangelinan; October 24, 1941 Saipan, Mariana Islands, South Seas Mandate
- Died: February 4, 2023 (aged 81) Maryland, U.S.
- Party: Democratic (Before 1983); Republican (1983–2023)
- Spouse: Dulce
- Education: University of Guam; George Washington University (BA); Howard University (JD)

Edward De Leon Guerrero Pangelinan (October 24, 1941 – February 4, 2023) was a politician from the Northern Mariana Islands. He served as the Chairman of the Marianas Political Status Commission and later as the 1st Resident Representative from the Northern Mariana Islands to the United States House of Representatives.

== Early life and career ==
Edward De Leon Guerrero Pangelinan was born October 24, 1941. He attended the University of Guam for two years before transferring to George Washington University to earn his bachelors. He earned his Juris Doctor from Howard University School of Law becoming the first Chamorro male lawyer in the Northern Mariana Islands.

Pangelinan married Dulce G. Pangelinan with whom he has six children. One of his children, James, attended West Point and is a Colonel in the United States Army. James Pangelinan is the highest-ranking member of the United States Army from the Northern Mariana Islands.

Pangelinan was elected to the Congress of Micronesia as a member of the Popular Party.

== Resident Commissioner ==
In the 1977 general election, he defeated Juan Tudela Lizama of the Territorial Party, winning 3,127 votes to Lizama's 2,524 votes to become the first Resident Commissioner to the United States House of Representatives. In 1983, he switched from the Democratic Party to the Republican Party. He lost reelection to Democrat Froilan Tenorio in the 1984 general election. He later became a lobbyist for the Northern Mariana Islands.

== Post-congressional career ==
In 1985, President Ronald Reagan reappointed Pangelinan to the Northern Mariana Islands Commission on Federal Laws. He served as a legislative assistant to Delegate Ben Blaz of Guam.

Pangelinan died of pancreatic cancer in Maryland, on February 4, 2023, at the age of 81.

U.S. House of Representatives
New office	Resident Representative of the Northern Mariana Islands; 1978–1984	Succeeded by Froilan Tenorio
