= Benjamin Manglona =

Northern Mariana Islands politician

3rd Lieutenant Governor of the Northern Mariana Islands
- In office January 8, 1990 – January 10, 1994
- Governor: Larry De Leon Guerrero
- Preceded by: Pedro Agulto Tenorio
- Succeeded by: Jesus Camacho Borja

President of the Northern Mariana Islands Senate
- In office January 11, 1988 – January 8, 1990
- Preceded by: Julian S. Calvo
- Succeeded by: Joseph Songao Inos

Mayor of Rota
- In office January 12, 1998 – January 11, 2006
- Preceded by: Joseph Songao Inos
- Succeeded by: Joseph Songao Inos

Personal details
- Born: Benjamin Taisacan Manglona; March 31, 1938 Mariana Islands, South Pacific Mandate
- Died: April 24, 2016 (aged 78) Rota, Northern Mariana Islands
- Party: Republican
- Education: Honolulu Community College; University of Guam
- Profession: Politician, civil engineer

Benjamin Taisacan Manglona (Chamorro: Manglo'ña) (March 31, 1938 – April 24, 2016) was a Northern Marianan politician and civil engineer. He is the CNMI's longest serving elected official having served as a congressman, senator, and former mayor of Rota (the third largest island in the CNMI chain). Manglona served as the third lieutenant governor of the Northern Mariana Islands from 1990 to 1994 and as Mayor of Rota from 1998 to 2006.

== Biography ==
=== Early life ===
Manglona was born on March 31, 1938. He earned a degree in Engineering Technology from Honolulu Community College in Hawaii and an associates degree in Civil Engineering Technology from the University of Guam.

Manglona began his career as a junior engineering aide, before his promotion to supervisor. He also worked as an assistant clerk of court and a station manager for Continental Micronesia, the major airline of Micronesia.

=== Political career ===
In 1963, Manglona launched his political career when he was elected to the Marianas District Legislature, serving from 1963 to 1965. He then became a representative in the Congress of Micronesia from 1965 to 1970, as the Northern Mariana Islands were part of the Trust Territory of the Pacific Islands at the time.

Manglona became a member of the Marianas Political Status Commission representing Rota in 1972. He served as the first Vice President of the Northern Mariana Islands' First Constitutional Convention of 1976. In that role, Manglona helped draft the Constitution of the Northern Mariana Islands, which was later ratified by voters and approved by the U.S. President.

Maglona took office as a Senator in the first sitting Northern Mariana Islands Commonwealth Legislature in 1978. He was re-elected to the Senate in each successive election until the sixth Legislature, when he was elected lieutenant governor.

Manglona was elected Lieutenant Governor of the Northern Mariana Islands in the 1989 on the gubernatorial ticket of Lorenzo I. De Leon Guerrero. Manglona was sworn into office in January 1990 and served one term until 1994. While lieutenant governor, Governor Guerrero assigned Manglona as the Commonwealth's point person for Section 902 talks with the U.S. national government.

He defeated incumbent Mayor of Rota Joseph Songao Inos in 1997 and served for two consecutive terms in office from 1998 to 2006. Manglona was succeeded as Mayor by Joseph Songao Inos on January 11, 2006.

In March 2011, the Northern Mariana Islands House of Representatives adopted House Resolution 17-45, which honored Benjamin Manglona for "his distinguished career in public office and his exemplary contributions to the CNMI." The house resolution, which was authored by Rep. Teresita A. Santos (Independent-Rota), was presented to Manglona on March 29, 2011.

On April 6, 2011, the Northern Mariana Islands Senate, where Manglona once served, passed a bill which would rename Rota International Airport as "Benjamin Taisacan Manglona International Airport" in recognition of his public service. The bill became law when it passed the House and was signed by Governor Benigno Fitial. N.M.I. Pub. L. 17-53, Sept. 26, 2011.

Manglona died on April 24, 2016, in Rota, Northern Mariana Islands from a stroke, aged 78.

Political offices
Preceded by Pedro Agulto Tenorio	Lieutenant Governor of the Northern Mariana Islands; 1990–1994	Succeeded by Jesus Borja
