= Froilan Tenorio =

Northern Mariana Islands politician (1939–2020)

Lang Tenorio
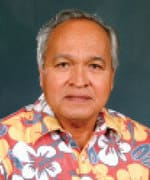

14th Speaker of the Northern Mariana Islands House of Representatives
- In office January 11, 2010 – January 14, 2013
- Preceded by: Arnold Palacios
- Succeeded by: Eli Cabrera

4th Governor of the Northern Mariana Islands
- In office January 10, 1994 – January 12, 1998
- Lieutenant: Jesus Borja
- Preceded by: Larry Guerrero
- Succeeded by: Pedro Tenorio

2nd Resident Representative of the Northern Mariana Islands
- In office January 9, 1984 – January 8, 1990
- Preceded by: Edward Pangelinan
- Succeeded by: Juan Babauta

Member of the Northern Mariana Islands Senate
- In office January 14, 1980 – January 9, 1984

Personal details
- Born: Froilan Cruz Tenorio; September 9, 1939 Saipan, South Pacific Mandate (now Northern Mariana Islands)
- Died: May 4, 2020 (aged 80) Fort Worth, Texas, U.S.
- Party: Democratic (before 1999, 2002–2009); Reform (1999–2002); Covenant (2009–2013); Republican (2013–2020)
- Spouse: Grace Tenorio
- Education: University of Guam (attended); Marquette University (BS)

Froilan Cruz "Lang" Tenorio (September 9, 1939 – May 4, 2020) was a Northern Mariana Islander politician who was the fourth governor of the Northern Mariana Islands. Elected in 1993, he served one term from January 10, 1994 to January 12, 1998. During his governorship and most of his political career, Tenorio was a member of the Democratic Party of the Northern Mariana Islands, which was not then affiliated with the American Democratic Party. However, he later switched his affiliation to the Reform Party, a party he founded. Froilan Tenorio would later switch back to the Democrat in 2002 and then to the Covenant Party in 2009.

== Early life and education ==
Froilan Cruz "Lang" Tenorio was born September 9, 1939 in Garapan, Saipan to Albert Camacho Tenorio and Rita Duenas Cruz. He was education in Saipan before moving to Guam for high school. He earned an associate's degree from the Territorial College of Guam in 1962. From 1962 to 1967, he attended Marquette University, and ultimately earned a bachelor's degree in civil engineering. It was during his time at Marquette University that he became a naturalized U.S. citizen via his older brother.

== Engineering and construction career ==
After receiving his degree, Tenorio worked for the City of Los Angeles Public Works Department from 1967 to 1972. In 1972, Tenorio returned to the Saipan after the death of his father. He joined his uncle "Joeten" Tenorio at Micronesian Construction Company. Two years later, he left MCC to form his own company, Tenorio Construction Company. He sold the company upon his election as Resident Representative.

== Early political career ==
Tenorio's early career in elective office consisted of one term as a CNMI Senator and three two-year terms as Resident representative, known colloquially as the Washington representative. He was reelected Washington Representative without opposition in the 1985 general election. In 1987, he was reelected over Jesus Pangelinan Mafnas, the chief personnel officer in the administration of Pedro P. Tenorio. In 1989, he ran for Governor with Victor Hocog as his running mate. He was unsuccessful.

== Governorship ==
=== Election ===
In 1993, Tenorio ran for governor again, this time with former Supreme Court Justice Jesus Borja as his running mate. The Tenorio-Borja ticket was unopposed in the Democratic primary. In the general election, Tenorio and Borja defeated the incumbent Guerrero-Manglona ticket.

=== Policies ===
Tenorio governed as a fiscal conservative in several ways. He warned the legislature against increasing spending without accompanying measures to increase revenue. However, the legislature implemented an earned income credit which was repealed after Tenorio left office because there were not enough funds to pay for it.

Tenorio frequently battled with the Republican-dominated legislature during his term. His first executive order was a sweeping reorganization of the commonwealth government that was contested by both litigation and by the legislature. It was eventually put into effect. The Republican legislature also frequently rejected Tenorio's appointments; Alexandro C. Castro, who was twice Tenorio's Supreme Court nominee, was twice rejected by the legislature. He was later appointed successfully to that court by Tenorio's successor, Pedro P. Tenorio, a Republican.

As Governor, Tenorio was a fierce opponent of federal legislation that would have extended federal minimum wage and immigration laws to the CNMI, which at that time was exempt from those laws. The predominant industry in the CNMI (outside of tourism) was the garment manufacturing industry, which drew chiefly upon female foreign workers, generally from China. These workers were generally paid far less than the minimum wage in the United States and were brought in extensively through the CNMI's immigration system, which differed from that of the United States. Federal legislation signed nearly a decade after Tenorio left office altered the minimum wage regulations and immigration system of the CNMI.

During his term, Tenorio was praised extensively by U.S. Representative Tom DeLay of Texas, including on the House floor in 1997:

Governor Tenorio has embarked on a bold course to promote economic and political liberty in the CNMI. The brave men and women who died for freedom at the battle of Saipan would be proud to know that Governor Tenorio has been a true champion of freedom in the Western Pacific. Governor Tenorio recognizes that the market, and not the government, is the engine of job creation. Governor Tenorio has pushed forward with a program of privatization, fiscal restraint, and lower taxes for his people.

DeLay and Tenorio shared strong ties to lobbyist Jack Abramoff, and both would become infamous in the Jack Abramoff CNMI scandal.

=== Defeat for re-election ===
In 1997, Tenorio ran for re-election in a three-way race. Republican nominee, former governor and Froilan's uncle Pedro P. Tenorio, won the election with 45.6% of the vote. Democratic support was split between Governor Tenorio and his Lieutenant Governor, Jesus C. Borja. Tenorio received 27.4% of the vote and Borja received 27%. Tenorio left office in early 1998.

== Controversy ==
=== Ties to Tom DeLay and Jack Abramoff ===
In 1993, the Tenorio administration, concerned that the federal government of the United States might attempt to end the CNMI's exemptions from federal minimum wage laws and federal immigration regulations, thus harming the islands' garment manufacturing industry, hired a firm, Preston Gates, to lobby on its behalf. Between October 1993 and September 2001, the firm was paid about $6.7 million by the CNMI government, about 72 percent of the government's overall lobbying payments. In 1995, Jack Abramoff, employed at Preston Gates, took on the CNMI as a client.

In October 1996, the contract with Preston Gates expired, but the Tenorio administration broke CNMI laws and continued to pay the firm without a valid contract until Tenorio left office on January 11, 1998. By the end of Tenorio's term, the CNMI government had paid the lobbyists a total of $5.21 million in public funds. The payment without contract was later judged illegal in an investigation by the CNMI Office of the Public Auditor.

In March 1996, March 1997, and October 1997, Abramoff arranged trips to Washington, D.C., for Tenorio and his wife. There, Tenorio met with Republican leadership in Congress, including Rep. Tom DeLay (R-Texas), Rep. Newt Gingrich (R-Georgia), Rep. Dana Rohrabacher (R-California), and several others. These same congressmen would later lead efforts to extend the CNMI's exemptions from federal minimum wage and immigration laws. On the October 1997 trip Tenorio also met with leaders of the Choctaw tribe in Mississippi, another Abramoff client for whom DeLay manipulated legislation. Around this time, Rohrabacher attacked proponents of subjecting the CNMI to federal minimum wage and immigration laws on the House floor, calling descriptions of the human rights violations going on in the CNMI "nonstop, politically driven attack[s] on the government and people of the Commonwealth of the Northern Mariana Islands."

Abramoff later arranged an all-expenses paid trip to the CNMI capital, Saipan, for Rep. DeLay on New Year's Eve in 1997. Although House ethics rules at the time prohibited House members from accepting such gifts from lobbyists, the trip was funded directly by the CNMI and thus was technically allowable. While visiting the islands, DeLay praised Tenorio, saying, "You represent everything that is good about what we are trying to do in America." DeLay also attended a reception hosted by Abramoff client Willie Tan of the Tan Holdings Corporation, which had been fined in the past for numerous violations of federal labor laws. Tan, who has been described as "a local powerbroker" in the CNMI, is part of the islands' garment manufacturing industry, notorious for forcing Chinese immigrant workers to live in squalid conditions, work for far less than minimum wage, engage in forced prostitution, and be subjected to forced abortions so they could continue to work.

After the trip, Abramoff helped DeLay craft policy that extended exemptions from federal immigration and minimum-wage labor laws to Saipan industries. Abramoff also allegedly paid the expenses for at least two other trips to the Marianas. In both cases, Abramoff was reimbursed by Preston Gates, which was then being paid by the Marianas government.

Ultimately, the CNMI ended its relationship with Preston Gates and Jack Abramoff in 2001, years after it was originally ended by Froilan Tenorio's successor, Pedro P. Tenorio, only to have the contract renewed by the commonwealth legislature under the direction of then-Speaker of the House Benigno R. Fitial. After this and other scandals were publicized, Abramoff pleaded guilty to felony charges related to the Jack Abramoff Indian lobbying scandal. Named in the Abramoff scandals and surrounded by associates pleading guilty or facing criminal charges in those scandals, DeLay resigned from the House of Representatives in disgrace in 2006. In 2010, Tenorio maintained that Abramoff "did the job" and deserved his pay.

=== Executive Order 94-3 and Sonoda v. Cabrera ===
In June 1994, Governor Tenorio submitted Executive Order 94-3 to the Commonwealth Legislature. The legislature failed to modify or disapprove of the order, thus allowing it to become effective. The order stated:

In order to assure the accountability of government managers, all officials at or above the level of division director, or the equivalent by whatever title known, shall be appointed by and serve at the pleasure of the Governor, provided that such official shall report to and serve under the direction of the head of any supervisory official, such as a department head.

In December 1995, Tenorio appointed Jose A. Sonoda as Director of the Division of Customs Services within the CNMI government's Department of Finance. Sonoda signed a two-year contract and a "Conditions of Employment" agreement, the latter of which made reference to the fact that government employees would serve at the pleasure of the governor under E.O. 94-3. In March 1996, Sonoda received a letter from the governor's Secretary of Finance, Antonio R. Cabrera, which terminated Sonoda's employment under E.O. 94-3. He was given no cause and no notice. Three days prior to his termination, Sonoda had testified at a legislative hearing; believing that his termination was revenge by the Democratic Governor Tenorio for his apparent Republican leanings in this testimony, Sonoda filed a lawsuit in district court against Cabrera and Tenorio, alleging that they had violated his rights under the United States Constitution to freedom of speech and due process. The district court certified to the Northern Mariana Islands Supreme Court the question of whether Governor Tenorio had violated the CNMI's constitution with E.O. 94-3. In April 1997, the Supreme Court answered that Tenorio had exceeded his executive power, granted under Article III of the CNMI's constitution:

While this Court recognizes that the Governor may reallocate offices for "efficient administration" subject to Legislative approval sixty days after submission, the Executive may not create a system whereby employment positions would be created and appointed at his pleasure. The Governor lacks the authority, under the Constitution, to appoint such positions.

The Supreme Court also ruled that E.O. 94-3 usurped the power to determine which positions were exempt from the civil service system, held exclusively by the CNMI Legislature under Article XX of the CNMI's constitution. For both of these reasons, the Court said it would rule that particular section of E.O. 94-3 to be unconstitutional. Tenorio and Cabrera appealed this decision to the United States Court of Appeals for the Ninth Circuit, which ruled in 1999 that it did not have jurisdiction in the case because it did not involve any federal rights or laws, citing the precedent set in Sablan v. Manglona.

In 2000, the district court denied Sonoda's motion for summary judgment, instead sua sponte granting summary judgment in favor of the defendants, stating that the reason for Sonoda's termination was irrelevant because Tenorio and Cabrera were entitled to qualified immunity as they had reasonable belief that Sonoda could be legally dismissed under E.O. 94-3. In 2001, the U.S. Court of Appeals for the Ninth Circuit reversed this decision, ruling that the defendants were not entitled to qualified immunity:

Regardless of whether the defendants reasonably believed Sonoda to be an exempted employee, this was legal error because even an at-will employee cannot be terminated if the reason for the termination was the exercise of constitutionally protected First Amendment freedoms.

The appellate court also held that the defendants were not entitled to qualified immunity in the due process claim either, as the Northern Mariana Islands Supreme Court had ruled that only the legislature could make exemptions from the civil service system in Manglona v. Civil Service Commission in 1992, thus making it a well-established precedent by the time Tenorio and Cabrera fired Sonoda. They remanded the case back to the district court to decide on that basis.

Sonoda v. Cabrera, therefore, embroiled Governor Tenorio in a lengthy legal controversy that lasted well beyond the end of his term and ended up striking down one of his executive orders as unconstitutional and stating that, in firing Sonoda, Tenorio had far exceeded his constitutional power.

=== Tax rebate account shortfall ===
During the 1997 gubernatorial election, Tenorio was heavily criticized when there were reports of $29 million missing from the CNMI's trust account for tax rebates. Rumors circulated that Tenorio had broken the law in some regard, perhaps by stealing the money. He lost his re-election bid that year. Later the CNMI Department of Finance stated that the $29 million was not missing as only $2 million had ever been deposited; the CNMI legislature had repealed and then reinstated the law requiring that funds be deposited in the account.

== Later career ==
After he lost his bid for re-election, Tenorio repeatedly attempted to return to the governor's office. In 2001, he ran in a four-way race against Borja (running as a Democrat this time), Republican Juan N. Babauta, and Benigno R. Fitial, who was running as the candidate of the new Covenant Party. Rather than running as a Democrat as he had in the past, Tenorio ran as the candidate of the Reform Party, which he had founded in 1999. Tenorio was soundly defeated, and Babauta was elected governor.

In 2005, Tenorio again entered the gubernatorial race, returning to the Democratic Party. After receiving the Democratic nomination, Tenorio finished fourth in a four-way contest, with approximately 18% of the vote. Fitial defeated Heinz S. Hofschneider and Babauta by a very small margin.

In May 2009, Tenorio announced that he had joined the Covenant Party and was allied with Governor Fitial. Rather than seeking the gubernatorial post again, Tenorio ran for a seat in the Northern Mariana Islands House of Representatives, hoping to represent Precinct 1. Tenorio ran on a platform of increased government investment in tourism, reform of the Commonwealth Utilities Corporation, and economic growth through job creation and increased purchasing power for residents, favoring job creation through new construction projects. He later said in an interview that if elected he would seek to restore the earned income credit, an anti-poverty program implemented by his administration in the 1990s, to increase employment and purchasing power. In the 2009 General Election, Tenorio won one of the six available seats in district 1, becoming the only Covenant representative in the district, with the other five won by those affiliated with the Republican Party. He subsequently selected for the post of Speaker of the House from 2010–2013, a unique three-year term caused by the 2009 and 2012 change in local elections from odd to even years, N.M.I. Const. art. VIII, § 1, He resigned from the speakership on January 13, 2011. He was succeeded by Eliceo Diaz Cabrera, who defeated Diego Benavente by a 12-7 vote. Tenorio continued to serve as a lawmaker for the remainder of the 17th Commonwealth Legislature.

== See also ==
- List of Asian Americans and Pacific Islands Americans in the United States Congress

U.S. House of Representatives
Preceded by Edward Pangelinan	Resident Representative of the Northern Mariana Islands; 1984–1990	Succeeded by Juan Babauta
Party political offices
Preceded by Carlos S. Camacho	Democratic nominee for Governor of the Northern Mariana Islands; 1989, 1993, 1997	Succeeded by Jesse Borja
Preceded by Jesse Borja	Democratic nominee for Governor of the Northern Mariana Islands; 2005	Succeeded by Pan Guerrero; Endorsed
Political offices
Preceded by Larry Guerrero	Governor of the Northern Mariana Islands; 1994–1998	Succeeded by Pedro Tenorio
Preceded by Arnold Palacios	Speaker of the Northern Mariana Islands House of Representatives; 2010–2013	Succeeded by Eli Cabrera
