= Lieutenant Governor of the Northern Mariana Islands =

Secondary political position in the Northern Mariana Islands

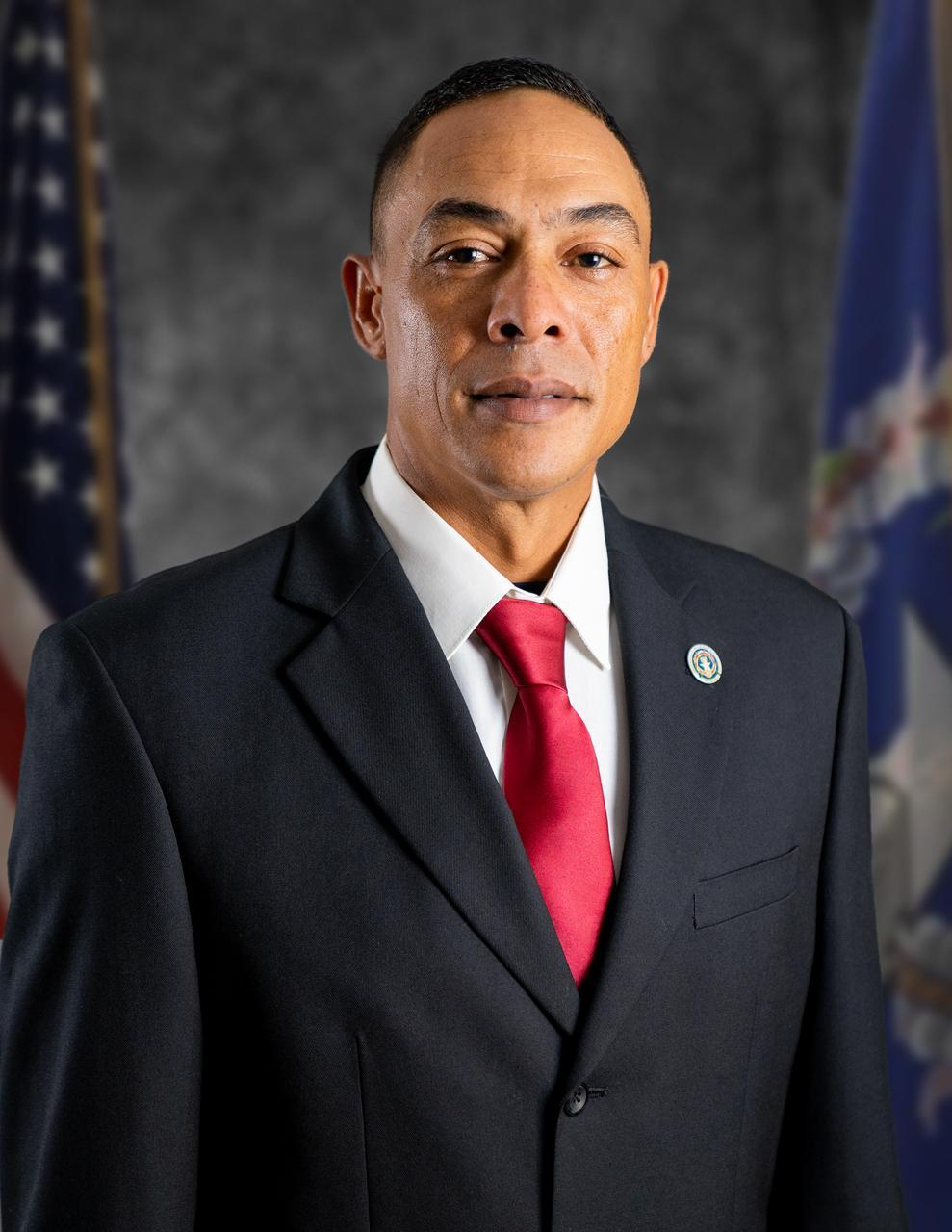
- Incumbent; Dennis C. Mendiola since July 23, 2025
- Type: Lieutenant Governor
- Formation: January 9, 1978
- First holder: Francisco Castro Ada

The Commonwealth of the Northern Mariana Islands has a self-governing government consisting of a locally elected governor, lieutenant governor and the Northern Mariana Islands Commonwealth Legislature.

The current lieutenant governor is Dennis C. Mendiola, since July 23, 2025.

== List of lieutenant governors of the Northern Mariana Islands ==
Image	Lieutenant Governor	Lived	Party	Years
	Francisco Castro Ada	(1934–2010)	Democratic	January 9, 1978 – January 11, 1982
	Pedro A. Tenorio	(b. 1941)	Republican	January 11, 1982 – January 8, 1990
	Benjamin Manglona	(1938–2016)	Republican	January 8, 1990 – January 10, 1994
	Jesus C. Borja	(b. 1948)	Democratic	January 10, 1994 – January 12, 1998
	Jesus R. Sablan	(b. 1952)	Republican	January 12, 1998 – January 14, 2002
	Diego Benavente	(b. 1959)	Republican	January 14, 2002 – January 9, 2006
	Timothy Villagomez	(b. 1962)	Covenant	January 9, 2006 – April 24, 2009
Office vacant April 24 – May 1, 2009
	Eloy Inos	(1949–2015)	Covenant	May 1, 2009 – February 20, 2013
	Jude Hofschneider	(b. 1966)	Republican	February 20, 2013 – January 12, 2015
	Ralph Torres	(b. 1979)	Republican	January 12, 2015 – December 29, 2015
	Victor Hocog	(b. 1953)	Republican	December 29, 2015 – January 14, 2019
	Arnold Palacios	(1955–2025)	Republican	January 14, 2019 – January 9, 2023
	Arnold Palacios	(1955–2025)	Independent	January 14, 2019 – January 9, 2023
	David M. Apatang	(b. 1948)	Independent	January 9, 2023 – July 23, 2025
	Dennis C. Mendiola	(b. 1979 or 1980)	Republican	July 23, 2025 – Present
