= Pedro Pangelinan Tenorio =

Northern Mariana Islander politician

Teno Tenorio
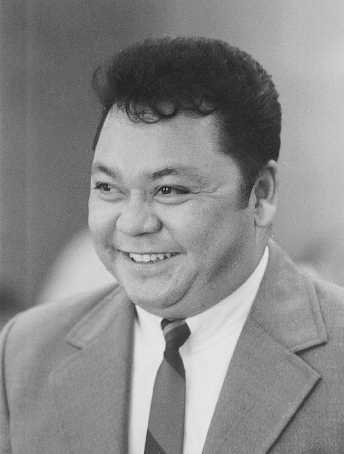

2nd and 5th Governor of the Northern Mariana Islands
- In office January 12, 1998 – January 14, 2002
- Lieutenant: Jesus Sablan
- Preceded by: Froilan Tenorio
- Succeeded by: Juan Babauta
- In office January 11, 1982 – January 8, 1990
- Lieutenant: Pedro A. Tenorio
- Preceded by: Carlos S. Camacho
- Succeeded by: Lorenzo Guerrero

President of the Northern Mariana Islands Senate
- In office January 14, 1980 – January 11, 1982
- Preceded by: Lorenzo Guerrero
- Succeeded by: Olympio Borja

Personal details
- Born: Pedro Pangelinan Tenorio; April 18, 1934 Saipan, Mariana Islands, South Pacific Mandate
- Died: May 21, 2018 (aged 84) Garapan, Northern Mariana Islands, U.S.
- Party: Republican
- Spouse: Sophie Pangelinan
- Children: 9
- Education: University of Guam (attended)

Pedro Pangelinan "Teno" Tenorio (April 18, 1934 – May 21, 2018) was a Northern Mariana Islander politician who served as the second and fifth governor of the Northern Mariana Islands from January 11, 1982, to January 8, 1990, and then from January 12, 1998, to January 14, 2002.

With 12 years in office, Tenorio was the longest-serving governor in CNMI history.

== Biography ==
Tenorio was born on Saipan. He graduated from George Washington High School in Guam and attended the University of Guam. He worked as a schoolteacher, a shipping executive, and a supervisor for a Naval technical and training unit. He first served in the House of Representatives of the Congress of Micronesia and subsequently became a member of the Marianas District Legislature.

In 1978, when the Northern Mariana Islands became a U.S. commonwealth (CNMI), he was elected vice president of the Northern Mariana Islands Senate in the first commonwealth legislature and chairman of the Programs Committee. He was elected president of the senate in 1980. Sworn in as governor in 1982, he was reelected for a second term in 1985. He was elected Governor again in November 1997 and was inaugurated on January 12, 1998.

== Personal life ==
Tenorio was married to Sophia “Sophie” Pangelinan Tenorio and had nine children, Peter Michael, Ruth Christine, Patrick James, Paul Gilbert, Perry John, Reina Sophia, Roslyn Carlyn, Rebecca Dena, Peter Patrick, and reared son Francisco.

He died on May 21, 2018, at the Commonwealth Health Center, Garapan, Saipan, and was buried at Mount Carmel Cemetery in Chalan Kanoa, Saipan.

Political offices
Preceded by Lorenzo Guerrero	President of the Northern Mariana Islands Senate; 1980–1982	Succeeded by Olympio Borja
Preceded by Carlos Camacho	Governor of the Northern Mariana Islands; 1982–1990	Succeeded by Lorenzo Guerrero
Preceded by Froilan Tenorio	Governor of the Northern Mariana Islands; 1998–2002	Succeeded by Juan Babauta
Party political offices
Preceded by Jose Camacho Tenorio	Republican nominee for Governor of the Northern Mariana Islands; 1981, 1985	Succeeded by Larry Guerrero
Preceded by Larry Guerrero	Republican nominee for Governor of the Northern Mariana Islands; 1997	Succeeded by Juan Babauta
