= List of governors of the Northern Mariana Islands =

Head of state and of government the U.S. territory of the Northern Mariana Islands

Governor of the Northern Mariana Islands
- Commonwealth seal

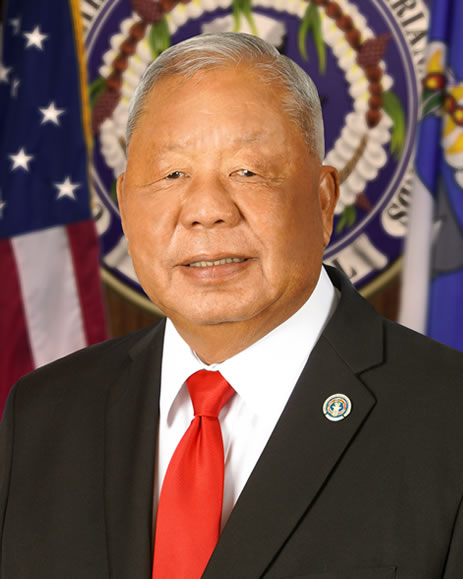
- Incumbent; David M. Apatang since July 23, 2025
- Residence: Juan A. Sablan Memorial Bldg.
- Term length: 4 years single term, eligible for second.
- Inaugural holder: Carlos S. Camacho
- Formation: January 9, 1978
- Succession: Line of succession
- Deputy: Lieutenant Governor of the Northern Mariana Islands
- Salary: $120,000 per year
- Website: governor.cnmi.gov

The following is a list of persons who served as governor of the Northern Mariana Islands. The term of office is 4 years. The longest-serving governors in the territory's history are Pedro Tenorio, who served 12 years in office from 1982 to 1990 and from 1998 to 2002, and Benigno Fitial, who served 7 years, one month, and 11 days from 2006 to 2013. The Northern Mariana Islands is one of the few U.S. states or territories that currently does not have a governor's mansion or other official residence.

The current governor is David M. Apatang, since July 23, 2025. He is an independent politician.

== List ==
Parties

Democratic (2) Republican (7) Covenant (1) Independent (2)

=== Resident Commissioners ===
No.	Portrait	Name (Birth–Death)	Took office	Left office	Party
1		Erwin Canham (1904–1982)	July 19, 1975	January 9, 1978	Republican

=== Governors ===
No.	Portrait	Name (Birth–Death)	Elected	Took office	Left office	Party
1		Carlos S. Camacho (born 1937)	1977	January 9, 1978	January 11, 1982	Democratic
2		Pedro Tenorio (1934–2018)	1981 1985	January 11, 1982	January 8, 1990	Republican
3		Lorenzo I. De Leon Guerrero (1935–2006)	1989	January 8, 1990	January 10, 1994	Republican
4		Froilan Tenorio (1939–2020)	1993	January 10, 1994	January 12, 1998	Democratic
5		Pedro Tenorio (1934–2018)	1997	January 12, 1998	January 14, 2002	Republican
6		Juan Babauta (born 1953)	2001	January 14, 2002	January 9, 2006	Republican
7		Benigno Fitial (born 1945)	2005 2009 (Note: To shift governor elections to even-numbered years, the 2009 gubernatorial election was for a five-year term.)	January 9, 2006	February 20, 2013 (Note: Fitial resigned following impeachment by the House of Representatives and prior to likely conviction in an impeachment trial by the Senate.)	Covenant (2006–2011) (Note: Fitial switched his party affiliation from the Covenant Party to the Republican Party on January 5, 2011, while in office.)
7		Benigno Fitial (born 1945)	2005 2009	January 9, 2006	February 20, 2013	Republican (2011–2013)
8		Eloy Inos (1949–2015)	– 2014	February 20, 2013 (Note: As lieutenant governor, Inos became governor following the resignation of Benigno Fitial.)	December 29, 2015 (Note: Inos died on December 29, 2015, while in office.)	Covenant (2013)
8		Eloy Inos (1949–2015)	– 2014	February 20, 2013	December 29, 2015	Republican (2013–2015) (Note: Inos switched his party affiliation from the Covenant Party to the Republican Party in September 2013, while in office.)
9		Ralph Torres (born 1979)	– 2018	December 29, 2015 (Note: As lieutenant governor, Torres became governor following the death of Eloy Inos.)	January 9, 2023	Republican
10		Arnold Palacios (1955–2025)	2022	January 9, 2023	July 23, 2025 (Note: Palacios died on July 23, 2025, while in office.)	Independent (2023–2024)
10		Arnold Palacios (1955–2025)	2022	January 9, 2023	July 23, 2025	Republican (2024–2025) (Note: Palacios switched his party affiliation from Independent to the Republican Party in December 2024, while in office.)
11		David M. Apatang (born 1948)	–	July 23, 2025 (Note: As lieutenant governor, Apatang became governor following the death of Arnold Palacios.)	Incumbent	Independent

== See also ==
- List of governors of the Spanish Mariana Islands
- List of governors of Guam
- High Commissioner of the Trust Territory of the Pacific Islands
- Lieutenant Governor of the Northern Mariana Islands
