= 2018 Northern Mariana Islands gubernatorial election =

- November 13, 2018
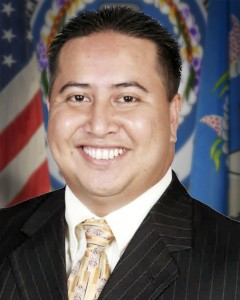

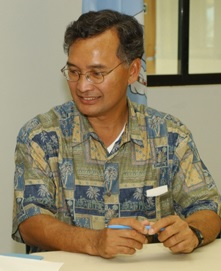
Nominee	Ralph Torres	Juan Babauta
Party	Republican	Independent
Running mate	Arnold Palacios	Rita Sablan
Popular vote	7,053	4,293
Percentage	62.2%	37.8%
- Results by voting district: Ralph Torres: 55–60% 60–65% 65–70% 70–75%
Governor before election
Ralph Torres
Republican
Elected Governor
Ralph Torres
Republican

The 2018 Northern Mariana gubernatorial election took place on Tuesday, November 13, 2018, to elect the Governor of the Northern Mariana Islands and the Lieutenant Governor of the Northern Mariana Islands to a four-year term in office. Incumbent Republican governor Ralph Torres, who ascended to governorship in December 2015 following the death of Governor Eloy Inos, sought election to a full term.

The election, which corresponds to the larger Northern Mariana general election and the United States midterms, was originally scheduled to be held on Tuesday, November 6, 2018. However, Governor Ralph Torres postponed all elections in the territory until November 13 due to the impact of Typhoon Yutu, which struck the Northern Mariana Islands as a Category 5 storm in October 2018, shortly before the planned elections.

Unlike past gubernatorial elections, there was no runoff election in 2018, since there are only two candidates contesting the gubernatorial contest, incumbent Ralph Torres and former governor Juan Babauta. On November 13, 2018, Governor Torres won his first full term as Governor of the Northern Mariana Islands.

== Election background ==
In the 2014 gubernatorial race, Republican governor Eloy Inos and his running mate, Ralph Torres, were elected to a full four-year term. The Inos-Torres ticket defeated independent candidate Heinz Hofschneider in the gubernatorial runoff on November 18, 2014.

Governor Eloy Inos died in office at a hospital in Seattle, Washington, on Monday, December 28, 2015 (local time in Seattle). Because of the time difference from Seattle, it was already Tuesday morning, December 29, in the Northern Mariana Islands at the time of Governor Inos' death. Lieutenant Governor Ralph Torres became the new governor of the Northern Mariana Islands on Tuesday, December 29, to serve the remainder of Inos' unexpired term. Victor Hocog, the then-President of the Northern Mariana Islands Senate, was sworn in as the new lieutenant governor later that day on December 29.

On November 8, 2017, Lt. Governor Victor Hocog announced that he would not run for re-election as lieutenant governor in 2018. Instead, he would seek election for one of the two Senate seats representing the island of Rota in the 2018 general election.

Governor Ralph Torres declared his candidacy for a full term in a press conference on November 19, 2017, at his home in As Teo. Torres chose Senate President Arnold Palacios as his new running mate for lieutenant governor in 2018 gubernatorial contest.

Juan Babauta, the former governor from 2002 to 2006, announced his candidacy on April 12, 2018, as an independent. He selected Dr. Rita Sablan, the former commissioner of the Commonwealth of the Northern Mariana Islands Public School System, as his running mate for lieutenant governor. His candidacy was supported by territorial delegate Gregorio Sablan, an independent who caucuses with the national Democratic Party in Congress.

== Election postponement ==
The Northern Mariana Islands' general and gubernatorial elections were originally scheduled for Tuesday, November 6, 2018, to correspond with the nationwide 2018 United States midterm elections. However, Typhoon Yutu made landfall in the Northern Mariana Islands as a Category 5 super typhoon, devastating the main islands of Saipan and Tinian. In response, Governor Torres postponed all elections in the Northern Mariana Islands until Tuesday, November 13, 2018, including the gubernatorial race.

Early voting was held from Tuesday, November 6, 2018, until Monday, November 12, 2018.

== Candidates ==
- Juan Babauta (Independent), former governor (2002–2006) and 2014 gubernatorial candidate; candidacy announced on April 12, 2018
  - Running mate: Rita Sablan, former Education Commissioner of the Northern Mariana Islands Public School System (2009–2016). Sablan was previously one of three individuals shortlisted by the Democratic Party to serve as the running mate for Joe Inos during his short time as an active candidate.
- Ralph Torres (Republican), incumbent governor (since December 29, 2015)
  - Running mate: Arnold Palacios, president of the Northern Mariana Islands Senate (since January 9, 2017). Palacios was announced as Torres's running mate on November 19, 2017.

=== Withdrew ===
- Joseph Songao Inos (Democratic), former mayor of Rota, former member of the Northern Mariana Islands Senate, and brother of the late Governor Eloy Inos. Inos announced his candidacy on January 19, 2018, but withdrew from the race on February 7, 2018, citing a lack of unified support from his family. Prior to dropping out, Inos was expected to name his running mate on February 15, 2018.

== Endorsements ==
Juan Babauta and Rita Sablan

Delegates

- Gregorio Sablan (Independent), incumbent delegate from the Northern Mariana Islands's at-large congressional district

Organizations

- Democratic Party
Ralph Torres and Arnold Palacios

Commonwealth-wide officeholders

- Diego T. Benavente, former lieutenant governor
- Froilan Tenorio (Democratic), former governor

Legislators

- Maria Frica Pangelinan (Democratic), former senator

== Results ==
The gubernatorial contest was held on Tuesday, November 13, 2018, having been delayed one week due to recovery efforts from Typhoon Yutu. Early voting began on November 6. Incumbent Ralph Torres won re-election to his first full term.

Northern Mariana Islands gubernatorial election, 2018
Party	Candidate	Votes	%	±%
Republican	Ralph Torres and Arnold Palacios	8,922	62.2%	
Independent	Juan Babauta and Rita Sablan	5,420	37.8%	
Total votes		14,342	100%	
