= Babauta =

Babauta is a surname. Notable people with the surname include:

- Juan Babauta (born 1953), Northern Mariana Islands politician
- Leo Babauta (born 1973), blogger from Guam, of Zen Habits blog
- Oscar M. Babauta (1954–2025), a politician from the Northern Marianas Islands.
- Sheila Babauta (born 1989 or 1990), Northern Mariana Islands politician
