= Arnold Palacios =

Governor of the Northern Mariana Islands from 2023 to 2025

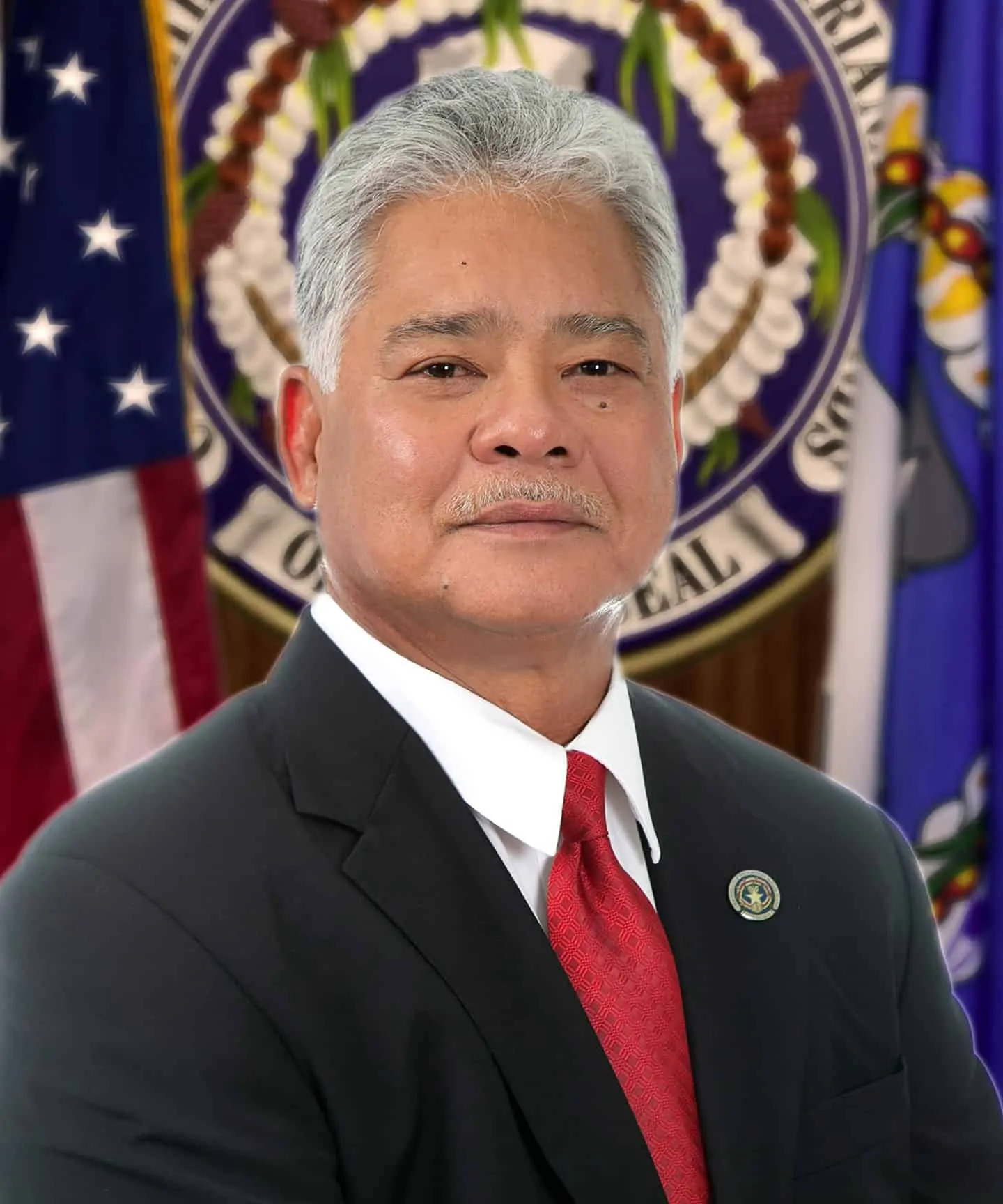

10th Governor of the Northern Mariana Islands
- In office January 9, 2023 – July 23, 2025
- Lieutenant: David M. Apatang
- Preceded by: Ralph Torres
- Succeeded by: David M. Apatang

12th Lieutenant Governor of the Northern Mariana Islands
- In office January 14, 2019 – January 9, 2023
- Governor: Ralph Torres
- Preceded by: Victor Hocog
- Succeeded by: Dave Apatang

19th President of the Northern Mariana Islands Senate
- In office January 10, 2017 – January 14, 2019
- Preceded by: Frank Borja
- Succeeded by: Victor Hocog

13th Speaker of the Northern Mariana Islands House of Representatives
- In office January 14, 2008 – January 11, 2010
- Preceded by: Oscar M. Babauta
- Succeeded by: Froilan Tenorio

Personal details
- Born: Arnold Indalecio Palacios; August 22, 1955 Saipan, Trust Territory of the Pacific Islands (now Northern Mariana Islands)
- Died: July 23, 2025 (aged 69) Dededo, Guam
- Party: Republican (before 2021, 2024–2025); Independent (2021–2024)
- Spouse: Wella Palacios
- Children: 4
- Education: Portland State University (BS)

Arnold Indalecio Palacios (August 22, 1955 – July 23, 2025) was the tenth governor of the Northern Mariana Islands, serving from 2023 until his death in 2025. He previously served as the 12th lieutenant governor of the Northern Mariana Islands from 2019 to 2023 and was a member of the Northern Mariana Islands Senate and Northern Mariana Islands House of Representatives. A lifelong member of the Republican Party, he briefly left the party between 2021 and 2024, when he became the first independent to be elected as governor.

== Early life ==
Palacios was born August 22, 1955, on Saipan, the son of Francisco T. Palacios, a member of the Marianas Political Status Commission. Palacios graduated from Portland State University with a BS in business administration. He served as the director of fish and wildlife during the 1990s.

== Political career ==
Palacios represented Election District 3 in the Northern Mariana Islands House of Representatives, which encompasses portions of Saipan and the Northern Islands. He served as the Speaker of the House after being sworn in on January 14, 2008, during the 16th Legislature.

Palacios was the running mate of gubernatorial candidate Heinz Hofschneider in the 2009 gubernatorial election. While the ticket narrowly won in the first round, they would go on to lose to Covenant Party candidate Benigno Fitial in the Islands' first run-off election.

Between 2010 and 2014, Palacios served as Secretary of the Department of Lands and Natural Resources under Governor Eloy Inos.

In the 2014 general election, Palacios was elected to the Northern Mariana Islands Senate, alongside Justo Songao Quitugua, defeating seven candidates for two seats from the 3rd Senatorial District (Saipan). He was sworn into office as a senator in the 19th Commonwealth Legislature on January 12, 2015. At the start of the 19th Commonwealth Legislature, Palacios was elected Floor Leader by a unanimous roll call.

In the 2018 gubernatorial election, incumbent governor Ralph Torres selected Palacios as his running mate. The ticket went on to win in the first round, with Palacios becoming the twelfth person to serve as Lieutenant Governor.

In 2021, Palacios announced he would be challenging Torres for the governorship in the 2022 election, running with Saipan mayor David M. Apatang as his running-mate. Palacios also announced that he would be running as an independent. After coming second in the first round, the eliminated Democratic candidate Tina Sablan endorsed the Palacios ticket, with a "unity pledge" being signed to align their similar policy goals. Palacios would win in the second round, with him being the first independent candidate to win a gubernatorial election in the Northern Mariana Islands. Following the election, Palacios appointed multiple Democrats to his cabinet, including Sablan's running mate Leila Staffler.

Palacios rejoined the Republican Party in December 2024. This was soon after Donald Trump's reelection as president of the United States, with Palacios justifying his decision as he believed Trump's vision and policies were aligned with his goal of bringing increased prosperity to the islands. Palacios reportedly made this decision in coordination with the national party, without consulting the local party leadership in the Northern Mariana Islands.

== Personal life and death ==
Palacios was married to Wella Sablan Palacios and had four children.

Palacios collapsed at his Capitol Hill office on July 23, 2025, and was airlifted for medical treatment to Guam Regional Medical City in Dededo, Guam. He died hours later at the age of 69. He was succeeded in office by David M. Apatang.

== See also ==
- List of party switchers in the United States

Political offices
| Preceded by Oscar M. Babauta | Speaker of the Northern Mariana Islands House of Representatives; 2008–2010 | Succeeded by Froilan Tenorio |
| Preceded by Francisco Borja | President of the Northern Mariana Islands Senate; 2017–2019 | Succeeded by Victor Hocog |
| Preceded by Victor Hocog | Lieutenant Governor of the Northern Mariana Islands; 2019–2023 | Succeeded by Dave Apatang |
| Preceded by Ralph Torres | Governor of the Northern Mariana Islands; 2023–2025 | Succeeded by Dave Apatang |
