= Pedro Guerrero =

Pedro Guerrero may refer to:

- Pedro E. Guerrero, photographer
- Pedro Guerrero (first baseman/outfielder), former Major League Baseball player
- Pedro Guerrero (coach), baseball coach
- Pedro Guerrero (bishop) (died 1613), Spanish Roman Catholic bishop
- Pedro Guerrero (composer), Spanish Renaissance composer
- Pedro Oliverio Guerrero, Colombian drug lord
- Pedro Rogolifoi Deleon Guerrero (1943–2024), 6th Speaker of the Northern Mariana Islands House of Representatives

== See also ==
- Pedro Guerreiro, Portuguese politician
