= Benigno Fitial =

Governor of the Northern Mariana Islands from 2006 to 2013

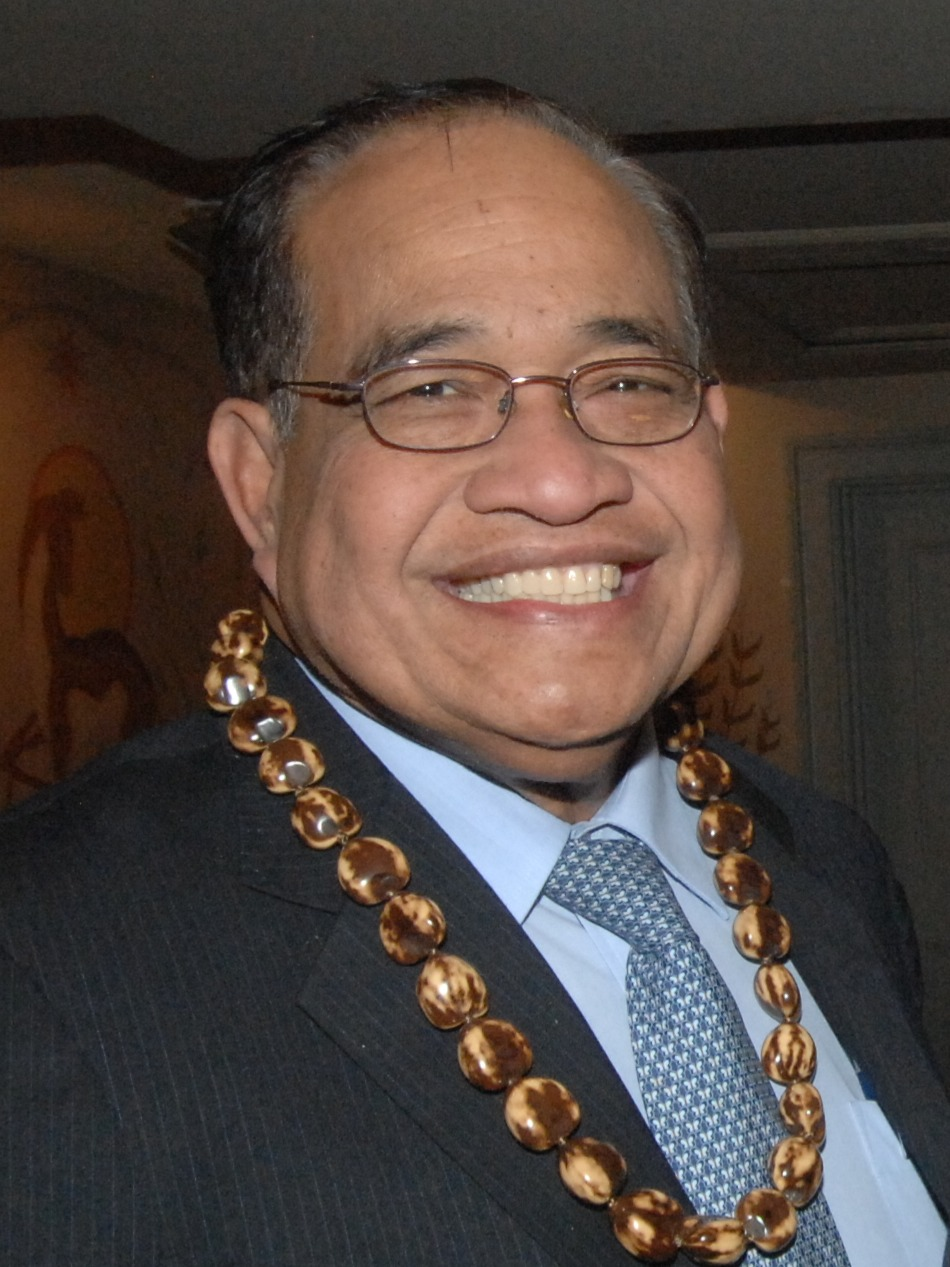
- Fitial in 2009

7th Governor of the Northern Mariana Islands
- In office January 9, 2006 – February 20, 2013
- Lieutenant: Timothy Villagomez; Eloy Inos
- Preceded by: Juan Babauta
- Succeeded by: Eloy Inos

Speaker of the Northern Mariana Islands House of Representatives
- In office January 12, 2004 – January 9, 2006
- Preceded by: Heinz Hofschneider
- Succeeded by: Oscar M. Babauta
- In office January 10, 2000 – January 14, 2002
- Preceded by: Diego T. Benavente
- Succeeded by: Heinz Hofschneider
- In office January 11, 1982 – January 9, 1984
- Preceded by: Joaquin Pangelinan
- Succeeded by: Vicente M. Sablan

Personal details
- Born: Benigno Repeki Fitial; November 27, 1945 (age 80) Saipan, Mariana Islands, South Pacific Mandate (now Northern Mariana Islands)
- Party: Republican (before 2001, 2011–present); Covenant (2001–2011)
- Spouse: Josie Padiermos
- Children: 6
- Education: University of California, Davis (attended); University of Nebraska (attended); University of Sonora (attended); University of Guam (BBA)

Benigno Repeki Fitial (born November 27, 1945) is a Northern Mariana Islander politician who served as the seventh governor of the Northern Mariana Islands from January 4, 2006 until his resignation on February 20, 2013.

Fitial was the first elected governor of Carolinian descent in the United States generally and the Northern Mariana Islands specifically. The second longest-serving governor in CNMI history, he was also the first territorial governor to be impeached. He resigned less than two weeks after his impeachment, on February 20, 2013, after 7 years, 1 month, and 11 days in office.

During his political and business career, Fitial was a prominent figure in the advancement and maintenance of the exploitative practices of the then-luxurative garment industry in the Commonwealth including the mistreatment of foreign workers and an opponent of the “federalization” of the then locally controlled immigration system.

== Early life and early career ==
Benigno Repeki Fitial was born November 27, 1945 in Saipan. He graduated from high school with honors at Mount Carmel School in 1964. After high school, he alternated between studying abroad and working in the CNMI. He attended University of California at Davis, the University of Nebraska, and studied for a semester at the Universidad de Sonora before graduating from the University of Guam in 1976 with a bachelor of business administration. He was hired to serve as a news manager at KJQR, a local radio station owned by the Trust Territory of the Pacific Islands. He was then transferred to the Department of Administration where he worked as a budget analyst until 1978.

In 1971, he was one of the twenty-three founding members of the United Carolinian Association.

He is married to Josie Fitial (née Padiermos), a Filipino who as a contract worker in 1983 moved to the CNMI. The couple met while she was working as a waitress on Saipan. They have two children together, in addition to Benigno Fitial's four children from a previous marriage.

== Business career ==
After his time in the legislature, he joined Tan Holdings Corporation, the largest garment manufacturer in the Northern Mariana Islands at the time, eventually becoming its top executive. Additional business activities included ownership of a strip club called Orchids which employed Filipina guest workers. He was president of Century Insurancy Company from 1988-1996.

Fitial has described himself in the past as a "good friend" of convicted U.S. lobbyist Jack Abramoff, who caused some controversy in both the Commonwealth and Washington. As vice president of Tan Holdings, Fitial worked closely with Abramoff, who had the family textile conglomerate as a consistent client.

While Speaker and afterwards, he was the president and board chairman of the Bank of Saipan both at the time of its collapse and during the alleged obfuscation of its financial troubles prior including violations of the CNMI’s Government Deposit Security Act. He resigned from the bank shortly after its 2002 collapse. He also held the board chairman position at the bank from 1990 to 1994.

== Early political career (1976-1988) ==
He joined the Territorial Party, a precursor to the modern Republican Party, upon reaching voting age. He was elected as a member of the Territorial Party to serve as a delegate from Saipan to the First Constitutional Convention. He became the convention's chairman of the Committee on Finance, Local Government and Other Matters.

Fitial became, and is as of 2025, a member of the Republican Party, and served as the chairman of the Republican Party in the CNMI.

== Legislative service ==
Fitial served in the Northern Mariana Islands House of Representatives on three occasions; 1980-1988, 2000-2002, and 2004-2006.

=== First Tenure ===
Fitial was first elected to the Northern Mariana Islands House of Representatives in the 1979 general election as a member of the Territorial Party. Fitial was the Speaker of the Northern Mariana Islands House of Representatives in the 3rd Commonwealth Legislature. When the Democrats regained a majority, Fitial assumed the position of minority leader for the Republican caucus while Vicente M. Sablan ascended to serve as speaker. When the Republicans took back a majority of the CNMI House two years later, Jose R. Lifoifoi ascended to the speakership while Fitial was named Vice Speaker. He chose not to run for reelection in 1987.

President Ronald Reagan appointed Fitial the chairman of the Northern Mariana Islands Commission on Federal Laws in 1985, while Fitial was a member of the legislature. He was appointed to replace Carter appointee James A. Joseph.

=== 1999 Return and 2000 Speaker Election ===
In his book, Capitol Punishment, longtime lobbyist Jack Abramoff recounts Fitial chose to return to politics to prevent federalization, which in part included retaining Abramoff at substantial taxpayer expense. In 1999, Fitial resigned from his position at Tan Holdings to run for the Northern Mariana Islands House of Representatives. He was successfully elected. After the 1999 election, the House of Representatives consisted of eleven Republicans, six Democrats, and a single independent. Fitial chose to run for Speaker against fellow Republican Heinz Hofschneider.

During the election for speaker, Jack Abramoff sent two operatives to the islands to lobby legislators on Fitial's behalf. The legislators from Tinian and Rota, winning over the legislators with support for federal projects. Fitial subsequently won the speaker election with a cross-party coalition of 10 votes to Heinz Hofschneider's 8 votes. Projects supported by the two non-Saipan legislators; a breakwater on the island of Tinian and the repaving of an airport in Rota were subsequently approved. After the passage of two resolutions from the House demanding that Abramoff be rehired by the CNMI government, Abramoff's contract was extended.

Fitial ran the House in a more controlling manner than previous speakers, appointing only his allies to committee chairmanships. He also implemented a pro-garment industry legislative agenda including an effort to double the number of guest workers.

In 2001, Fitial left the Republican Party, and founded the Covenant Party. He used the Covenant Party as a vehicle to run for Governor of the Northern Mariana Islands in the 2001 gubernatorial election with his running mate, then-Education Commissioner Rita Inos. However, Fitial was defeated in a landslide by the Republican ticket of Juan N. Babauta and his running mate, Diego Benavente. The Babauta-Benavente ticket received 5,512 votes, the largest number of votes ever received by a gubernatorial candidate in history to date.

In 2003, Fitial was elected to the Northern Mariana Islands House of Representatives in the 2003 midterm election. Candidates from his Covenant Party were also elected, giving the party the majority in the House of Representatives. Fitial was further elected the Speaker by the House in 2003, replacing Republican Speaker Heinz Hofschneider. He represented Precinct 3, which includes parts of Saipan and the northern islands.

== Governorship ==
Fitial was the seventh governor of the Commonwealth of the Northern Mariana Islands (CNMI). He defeated independent candidate Heinz Hofschneider and incumbent Republican Governor Juan N. Babauta during the 2005 gubernatorial election with 28.1 percent of the total vote after absentee ballots were counted. The 2005 gubernatorial election margin of victory of 84 votes was the closest in the history of the Commonwealth. Fitial and his running mate, Timothy P. Villagomez were sworn into office on January 9, 2006 as governor and lieutenant governor respectively.

Fitial faced challenges during his first term as governor, including budget shortfalls, a weak economy even before the 2008 financial crisis, declining tourism, electrical power generation failures, and the long-proposed federalization of CNMI immigration that was eventually enacted as Consolidated Natural Resources Act of 2008. Fitial appointed as his Special Legal Counsel Howard P. Willens, who had represented the Marianas Political Status Commission from 1972 to 1975.

He sued the US government over the federalization of immigration. He lost the case.

Some observers and local publications (such as the Marianas Variety) accused Fitial of concentrating power in his office. This included a decision made to abolish the autonomy of at least two government agencies, with their functions being transferred to the executive. The governor and his supporters asserted that drastic measures need to be taken to cut excessive government spending during the tenure of the previous governor, Juan Babauta.

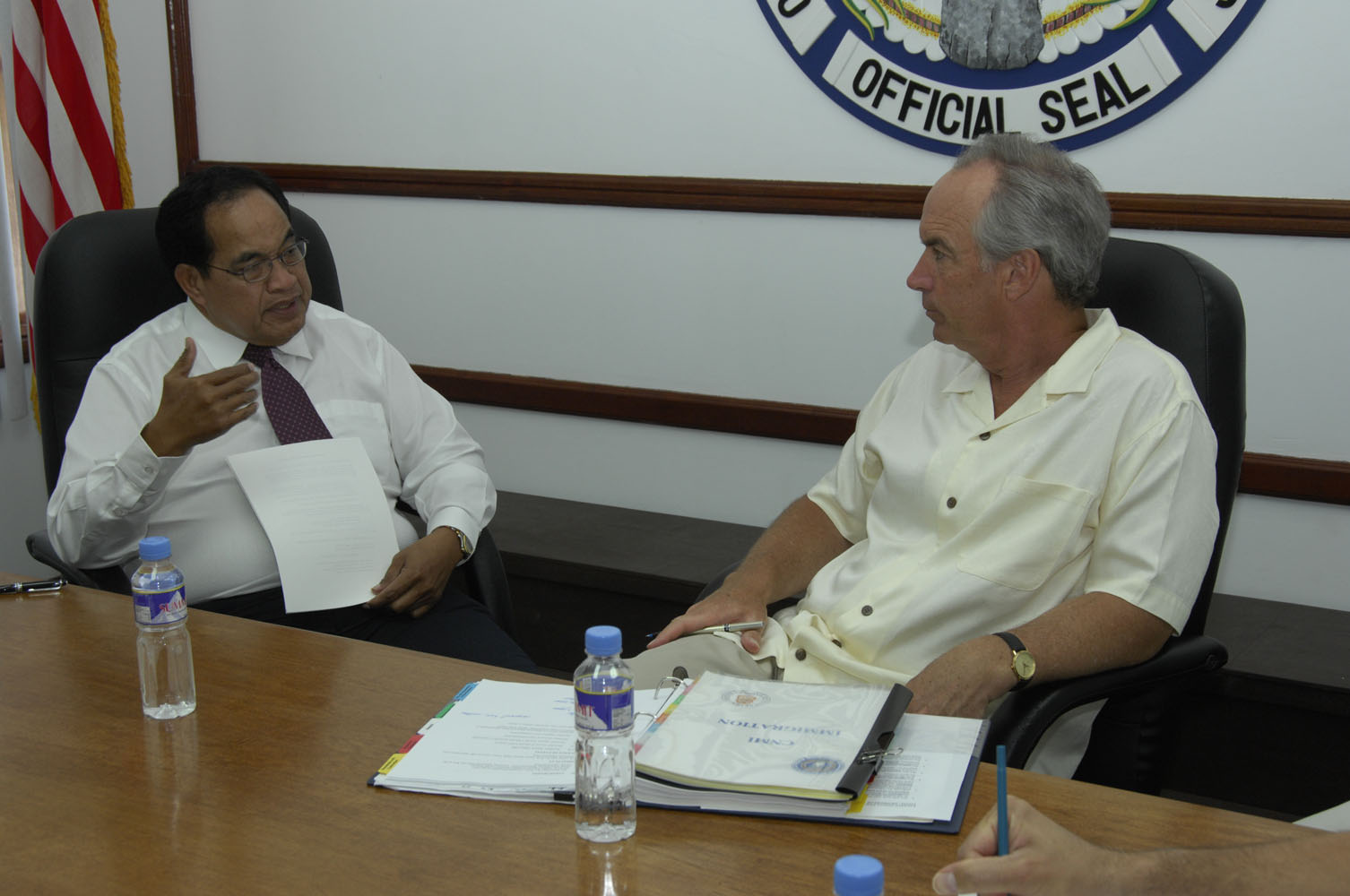
Fitial meets with United States Secretary of the Interior Dirk Kempthorne on Saipan, CNMI, 6 June 2007

Fitial was away from office for several weeks in late 2006 when he underwent successful surgery at UCLA Medical Center on October 31 to correct spinal stenosis.

Lieutenant Governor Timothy Villagomez resigned from office on April 24, 2009, following his conviction on federal criminal charges related to fraud while he was a member of the CNMI House of Representatives. Villagomez became the highest ranking CNMI official ever to be convicted in a criminal trial.

Under the Northern Mariana Islands Commonwealth Constitution, when a lieutenant governor vacancy occurs, the governor appoints a successor with the "advice and consent" of the Northern Mariana Islands Senate. Governor Fitial nominated the CNMI Secretary of Finance Eloy Inos to fill the lieutenant governor vacancy on April 27, 2009. Fitial and Inos had first met years earlier while both were working for the government of the now defunct Trust Territory of the Pacific Islands. Fitial was working as a budget analyst, while Inos was employed as a tax manager for the Trust Territory's revenue division at the time. They also worked together later as executives at Tan Holdings Corporation. Inos was unanimously confirmed in a vote by all 9 members of the Senate on Friday, May 1, 2009. Inos was sworn into office by Governor Fitial shortly after the Senate vote, becoming the Northern Mariana Islands first unelected Lieutenant Governor.

After the overwhelming Republican victories in the 2010 United States elections, Fitial decided to rejoin the Republican Party. His efforts to merge the Republican and Covenant parties ran into challenges with some members of the Covenant Party disinterested in joining or rejoining the Republican Party and some members of the Republican Party disinterested in Fitial's return. The Covenant Party ultimately continued and fielded candidates in the 2012 election. They also endorsed incumbent Gregorio Sablan over Fitial’s preferred candidate, Republican nominee Ignacia Tudela Demapan, for delegate, resulting in Fitial firing several Covenant Party members of his cabinet. The merger eventually happened under Fitial's successor Eloy Inos.

In the early morning hours of Saturday, August 4, 2012, Fitial assigned Carolinian police personnel to escort then-Attorney General Edward Buckingham to Saipan International Airport to flee prosecution for charges filed against him by the Office of the Public Auditor.

=== 2009 Gubernatorial re-election campaign ===
Governor Benigno Fitial announced in March 2009 that he would seek re-election to a second term in November.

On June 12, 2009, Fitial presided over Covenant Party midterm rally in Susupe with an estimated crowd of approximately 3,000 people in attendance. Fitial and Inos officially filed to run for re-election with the CNMI Election Commission on July 23, 2009, in the presence of nearly 200 family and supporters. In the November 2009 gubernatorial election, Fitial was challenged by the Republican nominee, Heinz Hofschneider, as well as independent candidates Juan Pan Guerrero and Ramon "Kumoi" Guerrero. In March 2009, Fitial had publicly stated that he will retire from politics if his re-election bid was unsuccessful. In the general election, Hofschneider led Fitial by just 8 votes; because none of the candidates won a majority, a runoff between Hofschneider and Fitial was triggered. Fitial won the runoff by 370 votes and therefore was re-elected. Due to a newly ratified legislative initiative, Fitial was expected to serve a five-year term, as the next gubernatorial election would now be held in 2014.

=== Impeachment ===
A minority bloc in the Commonwealth of the Northern Mariana Islands' House of Representatives filed an impeachment resolution August 28, 2012 against Governor Fitial, who was at that time in the United States for the 2012 Republican National Convention. The resolution was filed by Republican turned independent Joseph Pinaula Deleon Guerrero. The resolution accused the governor of "multiple felonies, multiple acts of public corruption" and of neglecting official duties. Those charges were eventually dismissed.

At the start of the 18th Commonwealth Legislature, Joseph Deleon Guerrero, now the Speaker, pre-filed eighteen articles of impeachment against Fitial. On February 11th and 12th, 2013 the CNMI House of Representatives voted to impeach Fitial on 18 different charges contained in Articles of Impeachment. The charges include neglect of duties, commission of felonies and abuse of power. Fitial became the first governor in any US insular area and the 13th in the history of the nation to be impeached. Subsequently, an impeachment trial was scheduled before the Northern Mariana Islands Senate on March 7, 2013. Rather than face such a trial, on February 20, 2013, Fitial became the first governor in CNMI history to resign from office. In his resignation letter he cited "personal health" reasons and the "best interests of the Commonwealth".

== Post-governor ==
=== Corruption conviction ===
He was sentenced by CNMI Superior Court Judge David Wiseman sentenced Fitial to the maximum sentence of six years' imprisonment for conspiracy to commit theft of services and one year and a sentence for misconduct in public office. The sentences were suspended except for one year for the conspiracy to commit theft of services and one year for misconduct in public office. The sentences were suspended except for one year and thirty days respectively, to be served concurrently. He was fined $6,000 for enabling Edward Buckingham to abscond from the Commonwealth to the continental United States. Fitial's sentence was commuted by his former lieutenant governor and successor Eloy Inos. After his commutation, he returned to Manila.

=== 2026 Gubernatorial elections ===
On October 11, 2026, around three weeks from the elections, Former Gov. Benigno R. Fitial endorsed Ralph DLG Torres and his running mate, Benjamin Jones Jr. for the 2026 CNMI Gubernatorial elections.

== See also ==
- List of minority governors and lieutenant governors in the United States

Political offices
Preceded by Joaquin Pangelinan	Speaker of the Northern Mariana Islands House of Representatives; 1982–1984	Succeeded by Vicente M. Sablan
Preceded by Diego T. Benavente	Speaker of the Northern Mariana Islands House of Representatives; 2000–2002	Succeeded by Heinz Hofschneider
Preceded by Heinz Hofschneider	Speaker of the Northern Mariana Islands House of Representatives; 2004–2006	Succeeded by Oscar M. Babauta
Preceded by Juan Babauta	Governor of the Northern Mariana Islands; 2006–2013	Succeeded by Eloy Inos
