= 2001 Northern Mariana Islands general election =

- November 3, 2001
- Gubernatorial election
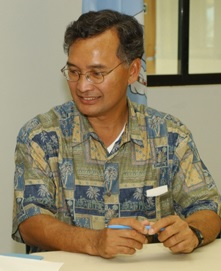

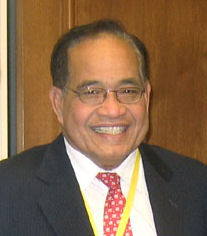

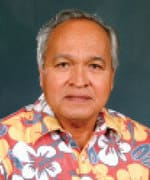
Candidate	Juan Babauta	Benigno Fitial
Party	Republican	Covenant
Running mate	Diego Benavente	Rita Inos
Popular vote	5,194	2,963
Percentage	44.61%	25.45%
Candidate	Jesus Borja	Froilan Tenorio
Party	Democratic	Reform
Running mate	Bridget Ichihara	Dave C. Sablan
Popular vote	2,117	1,368
Percentage	18.20%	11.75%
Governor before election
Pedro Pangelinan Tenorio
Republican
Elected Governor
Juan Babauta
Republican
- Senate election
- 6 of the 9 seats in the Senate; 5 seats needed for a majority
Party	Seats
Republican	5
Democratic	2
Reform	1
Covenant	1
This lists parties that won seats. See the complete results below.
- House election
- All 18 seats in the House of Representatives; 10 seats needed for a majority
Party	Seats
Republican	16
Covenant	1
Democratic	1
This lists parties that won seats. See the complete results below.
- Mayoral elections
- 3 Mayors
Party	Seats
Republican	2
Democratic	1
This lists parties that won seats. See the complete results below.

The 2001 Northern Mariana Islands general election was held on November 3, 2001, electing the governor and members to the legislature. The 2001 elections marked the last general election that the dissolved Reform Party, which merged back into the Democratic Party in 2002, would appear on the ballot. Despite the economic hardships experienced under Pedro Pangelinan Tenorio's Administration, the apparent strength the 1999 general elections signaled that the Democratic Party and its splinter Reform Party had, and the newly formed Covenant Party which was formed as a splinter party from the ruling Republican Party, Republican candidate Juan Nekai Babauta won with a landslide in the four-way race. Benigno Repeki Fitial's newly formed Covenant Party landed a distant yet sizable second place. Jesus Borja of the Democratic Party won a distant third and Froilan Tenorio of the Reform Party placed fourth.

== Background ==
Incumbent Governor Pedro Pangelinan Tenorio chooses to not seek a fourth term, ending his career with his unprecedented three term victories, being the only governor in CNMI history to win more than two terms. The 2001 elections takes place in the aftermath of the 1999 election, which saw the newly formed Reform Party achieve a "stunning upset and defeat of formidable incumbent Senator Juan P. Tenorio (Morgen) by newcomer Ramon "Kumoi" Santos Deleon Guerrero." The election of the CNMI's first third party lawmaker sent massive shockwaves throughout the territory and had aroused significant discussion for the future of the political landscape. However, the Reform Party's failure to obtain seats in the House of Representatives during the 1999 elections signaled that the Party may not have staying power. This took place at the same time the Democratic Party observed a resurgence. The 2001 election saw a four-way race between candidates from four political parties, including the newly formed Covenant Party. This election was also defined by the 1997 Asian financial crisis, which saw as many as 2,000 businesses in the CNMI close down, severely affecting the ruling incumbent Republican party. Tourism has been significantly negatively affected and austerity measures have begun to pressure the population as the economy has turned negative since Pedro Tenorio took office.

== Gubernatorial election ==
=== Candidates ===
==== Republican Party ====
- Juan Nekai Babauta, former Resident Representative of the Northern Mariana Islands (1990-2002) and former member of the Northern Mariana Islands Senate (1986-1990).
  - Diego Tenorio Benavente was Juan's running mate and former Speaker of the House of Representatives of the Northern Mariana Islands (1994-2000), former member of the Northern Mariana Islands House of Representatives (1990-2000).

==== Covenant Party ====
- Benigno Repeki Fitial, former member of the Northern Mariana Islands Senate (1982-1990), former Speaker of the House of Representatives of the Northern Mariana Islands (1982-1984), former vice speaker of the House (1986-1988), and former minority leader (1980-1982, 1984-1986).
  - Rita Hocog Inos, education commissioner of the Commonwealth of the Northern Mariana Islands Public School System (1998-2005).

==== Democratic Party ====
- Jesus "Jesse" Camacho Borja, former Lieutenant Governor of the Northern Mariana Islands (1994–1998) and former associate justice at the Northern Mariana Islands Supreme Court (1989–1993).
  - Brigida "Bridget" DLG Ichihara, former member of the Northern Mariana Islands House of Representatives.

==== Reform Party ====
- Froilan Cruz "Lang" Tenorio, former Governor of the Northern Mariana Islands (1994–1998), former member of the Northern Mariana Islands Senate (1980–1984), and former Resident Representative to the United States (1984–1990).
  - Dave C. Sablan.

=== Results ===
Northern Mariana Islands Gubernatorial Election
Party	Candidate	Running mate	Results	
Party	Candidate	Running mate	Votes	%
Republican	Juan Nekai Babauta	Diego Tenorio Benavente	5,194	44.61%
Covenant	Benigno Repeki Fitial	Rita Hocog Inos	2,963	25.45%
Democratic	Jesus "Jesse" Camacho Borja	Bridget Ichihara	2,117	18.20%
Reform	Froilan Cruz "Lang" Tenorio	Dave C. Sablan	1,368	11.75%
Total			11,642	100%
Republican hold				

== Northern Mariana Islands Commonwealth Legislature ==
=== Results summary ===
Parties	House Election Results		Seat Change	Party Strength
Parties	1999	2001	+/−	Strength
Republican	11	16	5 ▲	88.89%
Covenant	0	1	1 ▲	5.56%
Democratic	6	1	5 ▼	5.56%
Independent	1	0	1 ▼	0.00%
Totals	18	18	Steady	100.00%

Parties	Senate Election Results		Seat Change	Party Strength
Parties	1999	2001	+/−	Strength
Republican	6	5	1 ▼	55.56%
Democratic	2	2	0	22.22%
Covenant	0	1	1 ▲	11.11%
Reform	1	1	0	11.11%
Totals	9	9	Steady	100.00%

=== Senate ===
The Northern Mariana Islands Senate is the upper house of the Northern Mariana Islands Commonwealth Legislature, consisting of nine senators representing three senatorial districts (Saipan & the Northern Islands, Tinian & Aguijan, and Rota), each a Multi-member district with three senators. Each district had two seats open for the 2001 elections. Both of Rota's incumbent senators, Edward U. Maratita and Richardo S. Atalig, sought reelection.

=== House of Representatives ===
The Northern Mariana Islands House of Representatives is the lower house of the Northern Mariana Islands Commonwealth Legislature. The house has six districts, several of which are Multi-member district. All 18 seats in the Northern Mariana Islands House of Representatives were contested in the 2001 election.

== Mayors ==
Three mayoral posts were up for election across the Commonwealth. Saipan's incumbent Mayor, Republican Jose C. Sablan, announced that he would not seek reelection due to health issues. Republicans Frank Cepeda and Henry Sablan, and Democrat Juan Borja Tudela have expressed intention in seeking the Saipan mayoralty. Democrat Juan Borja Tudela won the Saipan mayoral race. Rota's incumbent Mayor, Benjamin Manglona, sought reelection and won. Incumbent Tinian and Aguiguan Mayor, Republican Francisco M. Borja, announced his reelection bid and won.
