= Dirk Ballendorf =

- Born: Dirk Anthony Ballendorf; April 22, 1939; Philadelphia, Pennsylvania
- Died: February 4, 2013 (aged 73); Guam
- Other name: Dirk
- Education: West Chester University; Ateneo de Manila University; Howard University; Harvard University
- Occupations: Historian, Professor
- Organization: Democratic Party of Guam
- Spouse: Francesca K. Remengesau
- Children: 4 (including Heidi Ballendorf)

Dirk Anthony Ballendorf (April 22, 1939 – February 4, 2013) was an American historian and professor whose area of expertise was Micronesia. Ballendorf, a specialist on Micronesian culture, politics, current affairs, and history, authored more than two hundred articles and eleven books during his career. He taught in the Department of Micronesian Studies at the University of Guam for more than thirty years.

== Biography ==
Ballendorf was born on April 22, 1939, in Philadelphia, Pennsylvania. He earned a bachelor's degree at West Chester State College, presently West Chester University. Ballenforf joined the Peace Corps after college and attended Ateneo de Manila University while serving in the Philippines. He next completed a master's degree in history from Howard University in Washington, D.C., and a doctorate in planning and administration from Harvard University in Massachusetts.

In 1977, Ballendorf became the president of the College of Micronesia on Pohnpei in the present-day Federated States of Micronesia. He served as president until 1979, when he joined the faculty of the University of Guam as director of the Micronesian Area Research Center. Ballendorf served as director of the Micronesian Area Research Center from 1979 to 1984 and again from 2004 until 2007.

Ballendorf authored eleven books and more than two hundred articles on the history of Micronesia. One of his best known works was The Secret Guam Study, a book which documents the political status of Guam. Ballendorf co-authored the book with a Washington, D.C., lawyer Howard P. Willens, who had served as the legal counselor for the Marianas Political Status Commission beginning 1972 through the completion of the negotiations which created the Commonwealth of the Northern Mariana Islands in 1978. To obtain the classified documents needed for the book, Ballendorf filed requests under the Freedom of Information Act in November 2000. When the requests were denied, Ballendorf and Willens filed suit against the U.S. Department of State, the U.S. Department of the Interior, and the U.S. Department of Defense, all of which soon provided the requested documents. Ballendorf and Willens used the documents to write their book, which was published in 2004.

Ballendorf died in his sleep on the morning of February 4, 2013, at the age of 74. He was survived by his wife, Francesca "Paka" Remengesau, who was from Palau; daughter, Heidi, the marketing administrator for the Guam Waterworks Authority, and son, Hans.
