= Senator Pangelinan =

Senator Pangelinan may refer to:

- Ben Pangelinan (1955–2014), Senate of Guam
- Maria Frica Pangelinan (born 1948), Senate of the Northern Mariana Islands
