= Rita Inos =

Northern Mariana politician

- Born: Rita Hocog; May 12, 1954; Songsong, Rota, Northern Mariana Islands
- Died: August 10, 2009 (aged 55); Saipan, Northern Mariana Islands
- Occupations: Educator, public servant, politician
- Spouse: Cristobal Songao Inos

Rita Hocog Inos (May 12, 1954 - August 10, 2009) was a Northern Mariana Island educator, activist and politician. Inos was the former Education Commissioner of the Northern Marianas school system and served on the Northern Marianas College Board of Regents. Inos was a two-time candidate for Lieutenant Governor of the Northern Mariana Islands, becoming the first woman to seek election to that particular office.

== Early life ==
Inos was born Rita Hocog on May 12, 1954, in Songsong, Rota, the Northern Mariana Islands. She was raised in Songsong as well.

== Education ==
Inos graduated from Arlington High School in Arlington, Texas.

She obtained her bachelor's degree in liberal arts from the University of Hawaii at Manoa in 1979. Inos then received a master's degree in educational anthropology from California State University.

Inos obtained a second master's degree in school administration and supervision from San Jose State University in California in 1983. She finally earned a doctorate in Education from the University of Southern California in 1994.

== Career ==
Inos began her career in education as a bilingual teacher at schools on Saipan and Rota in 1972. She would later serve as the principal of Rota Elementary School.

Inos became the director of programs and services at the Pacific Resources for Education and Learning (PREL) nonprofit from 1990 to 1994. She was promoted to the deputy director of the PREL Western Pacific Center from 1994 until 1998. Inos later became the chairperson of the PREL's board of directors from 2004 to 2006.

She served as the education commissioner of the Commonwealth of the Northern Mariana Islands Public School System (PSS) from June 1998 until December 2005.

Inos authored a number of scholarly and educational publications related to education in the Northern Mariana Islands, Micronesia and the Pacific. Works authored by Inos include Chamorro Elementary Grades Reading Books, Chamorro Grammar Workbook for Grades 4-8 and the PSS Bilingual Program.

Governor Benigno Fitial appointed Rita Inos to the Northern Marianas College Board of Regents in February 2006. She served as the board's chairperson from June 2006 until July 2008.

Additionally, Inos was elected as a delegate from Rota in the Second Constitutional Convention of the Northern Mariana Islands in 1985. She chaired the Constitutional Convention's committee on finance.

=== Politics ===
Inos became the running mate for former Governor Lorenzo I. De Leon Guerrero in the 1997 gubernatorial election. Inos candidacy for Lieutenant Governor of the Northern Mariana Islands marked the first time that a female candidate had sought that particular office. Guerrero and Inos were defeated in the 1997 election by fellow Republican Pedro Tenorio.

Benigno Fitial, who called Inos one of his mentors, ran for governor in 2001 with Rita Inos as his running mate for lieutenant governor. The Fitial-Inos ticket ran under the Covenant Party banner, which Fitial had founded in 2001, the same year as the general election. Fitial explained his choice of Inos for his running mate in 2009, saying, "I relied on her for advice on public policy issues concerning education. This is why I chose her to be my running mate in the 2001 CNMI general elections. Our plan was for me to focus on economic development, while she handled important education issues. This is also why I nominated her to the Northern Marianas College's Board of Regents, where she served until she passed away."

Benigno Fitial and Rita Inos lost to Republican Juan N. Babauta in the 2001 general election. Fitial would later be elected governor in the 2005 general election with a different running mate, Timothy P. Villagomez.

Inos' brother-in-law, Eloy Inos, became the lieutenant governor of the Northern Mariana Islands in 2009, following Villagomez's resignation for a corruption conviction.

== Death ==
Rita Inos died on August 10, 2009, at the Commonwealth Health Center in Saipan, Northern Mariana Islands at the age of 55. Inos was rushed to the hospital at approximately 2 A.M. the same day, but was pronounced dead after doctors failed to revive her. She had been suffering from cancer for sometime, specifically breast cancer, but had not been bedridden. She was survived by her husband, Cristobal Songao Inos, and daughter, Denise Lorraine. Her daughter Ana Blossom died in September 2012.

The Saipan Municipal Council honored Inos with a resolution commemorating her life and work.

A memorial service for Inos was held at the Mt. Carmel Cathedral in Chalan Kanoa, Saipan. A second public viewing and memorial service were held on her native Rota island. Rita Inos' funeral mass took place at the San Francisco de Borja Catholic Church on Tuesday, August 18, 2009. She was buried in the San Jose Cemetery in Rota on the same day.
