= Howard P. Willens =

Lawyer

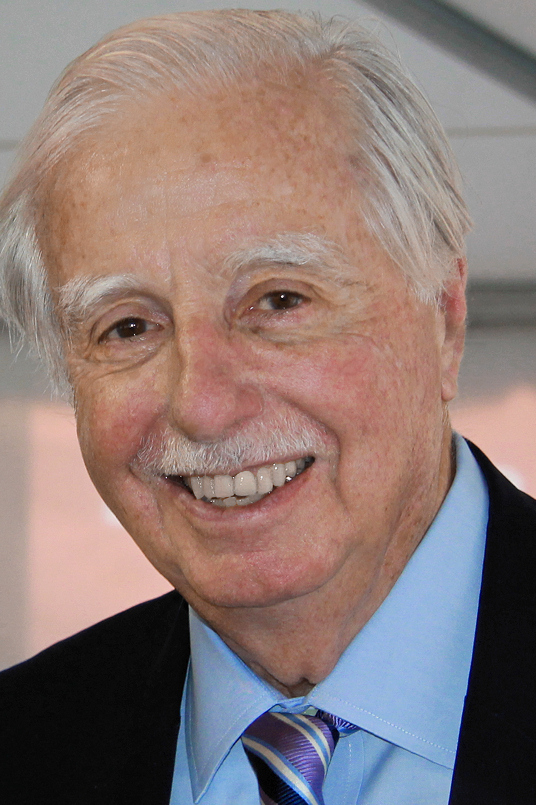
Willens at the 2013 Texas Book Festival.

Howard Penney Willens (born May 27, 1931) is a lawyer and author who served as Assistant Counsel to the Warren Commission from December 1963 to September 1964. In that role, Willens worked with the lawyers and agents conducting the investigation of the assassination of President John F. Kennedy, reviewed the lawyers’ memoranda for submission to members of the commission, and edited the material that became the Report of the commission. His book, History Will Prove Us Right: Inside the Warren Commission Report on the Assassination of John F. Kennedy, published in 2013, relied on previously undisclosed primary sources to document the methods and strategies underlying the "most massive, detailed and convincing piece of detective work ever undertaken."

== Early life and education ==
Willens was born in Oak Park, Ill., on May 27, 1931. He received his bachelor's degree, with high distinction, from the University of Michigan in 1953 and his Bachelor of Laws in 1956 from Yale Law School where he was an editor on the Yale Law Journal. Willens then served in the U.S. Army from 1956 to 1958 at Fort Lewis, Washington.

== Early career ==
In late 1958, Willens joined the law firm of Kirkland, Ellis, Hodson, Chaffetz & Masters in Washington, D.C. At that time, the U.S. Senate's McClellan Committee was engaged in public hearings led by Robert F. Kennedy concerning the influence of organized crime in the International Brotherhood of Teamsters (IBT) and possible criminal conduct by the IBT president, Jimmy Hoffa. Separately, a lawsuit filed in 1957 by dissident union members resulted in a consent decree requiring Hoffa and other IBT officials to address evidence of corruption. The court created a three-member Board of Monitors to supervise and enforce the implementation of the consent decree.

In 1960, the Board of Monitors hired Kirkland Ellis to handle several disputes between the Board and the IBT concerning the union's compliance with the consent decree. Willens joined a team of lawyers headed by Herbert J. ("Jack") Miller Jr. to investigate various allegations against Hoffa relating to the disappearance of IBT records and the misuse of union funds.

Following President Kennedy's election, Robert Kennedy was appointed Attorney General in 1961. He selected Jack Miller to serve as head of the Criminal Division of the Justice Department, and Willens became Second Assistant Attorney General in the Criminal Division. They hired more lawyers to handle several investigations of Hoffa that were already underway in the Justice Department based on information collected by the McClellan Committee and the FBI. These investigations resulted in several indictments against Hoffa and his affiliates.

When Justice Department lawyers learned that Hoffa attempted to tamper with the jury in one of those cases, Robert Kennedy sent Willens to Tennessee to handle the Government's response. Hoffa was convicted of jury tampering in 1964 and sentenced to eight years in prison. When Hoffa appealed his conviction to the Sixth Circuit Court of Appeals, Willens represented the Government and obtained an order affirming the conviction in 1965.

== Warren Commission ==
On November 29, 1963, one week after President Kennedy was assassinated in Dallas, President Lyndon B. Johnson appointed a seven-member commission headed by Chief Justice Earl Warren to conduct the federal government's investigation. Willens participated in early meetings inside the Justice Department concerning the law-enforcement response to the assassination. On December 5, he obtained one of the few copies of the FBI's preliminary report identifying Lee Harvey Oswald as the likely assassin, and prepared a summary noting critical errors in the FBI's work.

On December 17, Willens was assigned by Nicholas Katzenbach to join the staff of the Warren Commission, reporting to the chief counsel, Lee Rankin. Willens worked full-time on the commission's investigation until its report was issued on September 24, 1964. In the early days, his work focused on hiring lawyers and investigators; gathering and reviewing the records collected by the FBI and local police concerning the assassination; and preparing a rough outline of topics to be investigated and reported to the commission. Willens personally recruited several lawyers to join the staff, including Arlen Specter.

Rankin assigned a team of two lawyers to each of the major areas for investigation. Willens observed the first meeting of the newly hired staff January 13, 1964, and reported: "The lawyers were enthusiastic about their assignments, eager to get to work, and determined to ferret out whatever conspiracy might have led to the assassination and the murder of Oswald."

Rankin assigned Willens to coordinate the work of the investigative teams and to assist their communication with other agencies. Willens worked closely with Norman Redlich to monitor the progress of the teams and edit their interim reports. He also acted as a liaison between the Commission and the Justice Department, providing frequent informal updates to Miller and Katzenbach.

Willens reports in his book that the commission's attorneys knew from the beginning of the investigation that the FBI had made serious errors in its initial report of the assassination. As the investigation continued, it became clear that the FBI was withholding important information about Oswald. Among other things, the FBI misled the Commission concerning its surveillance of Oswald in Dallas and New Orleans before the assassination, and failed to disclose Oswald's encounter with FBI Agent James Hosty. Further, in an act of "inexcusable dishonesty," Hoover concealed from the commission his own decision to discipline Hosty and 16 other FBI agents for their failure to identify Oswald as a security risk and to inform the Secret Service before the president's arrival in Dallas. Willens notes that later investigations examined the hidden FBI evidence "and no facts have come to light that challenge our fundamental conclusions regarding the identity of the assassin and the absence of any conspiracy."

From the outset of the investigation, the commission's lawyers believed that evidence of a conspiracy was most likely to be found in Mexico, where Oswald traveled in September 1963. In April 1964, Willens went to Mexico to meet with FBI and CIA agents and to speak to witnesses concerning Oswald's interactions with Soviet and Cuban personnel in Mexico City. The agents indicated that Oswald's activities in Mexico were limited to efforts to obtain visas for travel through Cuba to the Soviet Union, and no evidence suggested that his visit was related to President Kennedy.

In his book, Willens describes the genesis of the single-bullet theory in informal meetings of the commission attorneys as they tried to determine the number of bullets fired at the presidential car and who was hit by each bullet. One attorney, David Belin, focused his efforts on trying to prove that a second shooter had participated in the assassination, but detailed work by the FBI and analysis of the Zapruder film suggested that all of the shots that hit President Kennedy and Governor Connally originated from Oswald's position in the book depository. Based on that work, the staff lawyers decided to test the hypotheses that the first bullet to hit the president also caused Connally's wounds. Over the objection of the FBI and Secret Service, they organized a reenactment of the shooting in Dallas on May 24, 1964. The reenactment "produced convincing evidence" supporting the single-bullet theory, and that evidence was confirmed by expert review of the medical and ballistics evidence. However, because Gov. Connally testified that he was hit by the second bullet – not the first bullet that hit the president – the Commission decided not to take a position on the single-bullet theory. Instead, the Commission concluded that "there is no question" that all of the shots were fired from the sixth floor of the book depository.

At Warren's request, Willens prepared a draft outline of the commission's report on March 31, 1964. Thereafter, Willens, Redlich and Rankin shared the work of reviewing and editing each section of the report. Willens writes that their goal was to present the facts "in a way that would persuade readers that our investigation was sufficiently thorough that the conclusion finding no credible evidence of a conspiracy was a fair and reasonable one." The Commission delivered the report to the president on September 24, 1964, and released it to the public on September 27.

== President Johnson’s Crime Commission ==
In August 1965, Willens left the Department of Justice to serve as executive director of the President's Commission on Crime in the District of Columbia. On December 31, 1966, the Commission released a 1,041-page report that recommended a series of reforms to address rapidly rising crime rates in the District, including gun control legislation, reorganization of the police department, speedier handling of criminal cases and changes to bail laws. The commission noted that the District's low-income community faced unemployment, racial segregation, poor education and vocational training, all of which contributed to crime.

== 1968 Democratic National Convention ==
Willens was a member of the delegation representing the District of Columbia at the Democratic National Convention in Chicago in August 1968. Members of the delegation were originally pledged to Robert F. Kennedy, but Kennedy was assassinated in June 1968. Following his death, the delegation voted to nominate Rev. Channing E. Phillips, a Baptist minister and activist who was the leader of the delegation. Rev. Phillips became the first African-American to be nominated for president by a major party.

== Private Practice ==
In 1967, Willens joined the law firm then known as Wilmer, Cutler & Pickering in Washington, D.C. His major clients included the Ford Motor Company, Educational Testing Service and the Northern Mariana Islands. He retired from the law firm in 1995.

== Northern Mariana Islands ==
Beginning in December 1972, Willens represented the Marianas Political Status Commission in negotiations with the United States. The negotiations resulted in an agreement in 1976 entitled the "Covenant to Establish a Commonwealth of the Northern Mariana Islands in Political Union with the United States of America."

As Willens stated, when President Ford signed legislation adopting the Covenant on March 24, 1976, "[t]he fourteen thousand citizens of the Marianas had successfully exercised their right of self-determination. Against all odds, they accomplished what no people preceding them had ever done – they joined the United States voluntarily on terms they had negotiated and approved."

Working with his colleague, co-author, and wife, Deanne C. Siemer, Willens served as counsel for the First Constitutional Convention from 1976 to 1977. The resulting constitution has been in effect in the Commonwealth of the Northern Mariana Islands (CNMI) since January 1978. Thereafter, Willens and Siemer represented the Commonwealth in a series of legal challenges to federal government action concerning key provisions of the Covenant.

From 2006 to 2010 Willens served on Saipan as Special Legal Counsel to CNMI Governor Benigno Fitial.

== Later career ==
After leaving Wilmer Cutler in 1995, Willens published three books concerning American foreign policy in the Pacific and the efforts of the people of the Northern Marianas to join the United States. Willens and Siemer engaged in a five-year legal battle with the U.S. Department of Justice to obtain documents under the Freedom of Information Act, resulting in the disclosure of approximately 70,000 pages of internal agency records. Based on these records and other sources, Willens and Siemer wrote National Security and Self-Determination: United States Policy in Micronesia, 1961-72 (2000) and An Honorable Accord, The Covenant between the Northern Mariana Islands and the United States (2002). With Dirk Ballendorf, Willens wrote The Secret Guam Study: How President Ford’s Approval of Commonwealth Was Blocked by Federal Officials in 2005.

For the 50th anniversary of the Kennedy assassination, Willens wrote History Will Prove Us Right in 2013. The book is based in part on contemporaneous journals and correspondence that had not been previously disclosed. In later years, Willens participated in lectures and panel discussions concerning the assassination, subsequent investigations and conspiracy theories.

== Publications ==
- Willens & Siemer, National Security and Self-Determination: United States Policy in Micronesia, 1961–72, ABC-CLIO, 2000.
- Willens & Siemer, An Honorable Accord, The Covenant between the Northern Mariana Islands and the United States, University of Hawaii Press, 2002.
- Willens & Ballendorf, The Secret Guam Study: How President Ford's 1975 Approval of Commonwealth was Blocked by Federal Officials, University of Guam Press, 2005.
- Willens, History Will Prove Us Right: Inside the Warren Commission Report on the Assassination of John F. Kennedy, Overlook Press, 2013
