= Vicente Camacho =

Politician from Northern Marianas Islands

Vicente Taitingfong Camacho (April 5, 1929 – January 2, 2016) was a Northern Mariana Islands politician, civil servant and businessman. Camacho was a member of the Marianas Political Status Commission from 1972 until 1976. The Commission negotiated the 1975 Commonwealth Covenant, which established the political union between the Northern Mariana Islands and the United States. Camacho, who was a signatory of the Covenant, has been called one of the "founding fathers" of the Commonwealth Covenant and the present government of the Northern Mariana Islands.

Vicente Taitingfong Camacho was born on Saipan on April 5, 1929. He began his political career as a member of the Saipan Municipal Legislature. He was the speaker of the Municipal Legislature from 1970 until 1975.

Camacho was a member of the Marianas Political Status Commission from 1972 until 1976. The commission, led by chairman Edward D.L.G. Pangelinan, negotiated the Commonwealth Covenant, which established the present political union with the United States. Camacho signed the Covenant on February 15, 1975. The Covenant recognized the sovereignty of the United States over the Northern Mariana Islands, and established certain limitations to the union.

Outside of public politics, Camacho established the Marianas Printing Services. He was the business' manager and vice president until his retirement in 1985.

Camacho was also an advocate of tourism in the Northern Mariana Islands. He helped to establish the Marianas Visitors Bureau, now called the Marianas Visitors Authority, the territory's official destination marketing organization. Camacho, who spoke fluent Japanese, helped to develop the Northern Mariana Islands as a major vacation destination for Japanese tourists. He oversaw the creation of the Ocean University Student Exchange, also called the Wakai Neko Nekai, which created cultural exchanges between students from Japan and the Northern Mariana Islands.

In 1998, Camacho and two of his children, Lillian and Julie, opened Bencam Enterprises, a family business which offered wedding, funeral, floral and rental services. He remained president of the business until 2014.

The Saipan and Northern Islands Municipal Council honored Camacho and other members of the Political Status Commission with a resolution in 2004.

Camacho died on January 2, 2016, at the age of 86.
