= Heinz Hofschneider =

Northern Mariana Islands politician (born 1957)

10th Speaker of the Northern Mariana Islands House of Representatives
- In office January 14, 2002 – January 12, 2004
- Preceded by: Benigno Fitial
- Succeeded by: Benigno Fitial

Personal details
- Born: July 1, 1957 (age 68) Saipan, Trust Territory of the Pacific Islands (now Northern Mariana Islands)
- Party: Republican (before 2014); Independent (2014–present)
- Spouse: Susana Sablan
- Children: 2
- Education: Menlo College (attended); California State University, Los Angeles (BS)

Heinz Sablan Hofschneider (born July 1, 1957) is a politician from the Northern Mariana Islands. Hofschneider served as the Speaker of the Northern Mariana Islands House of Representatives from 2002 to 2004 and is a four-time candidate for Governor of the Northern Mariana Islands.

== Early life and career ==
Heinz Sablan Hofschneider was born July 1, 1957, in Saipan to William Villagomez Hofschneider and Primitiba Roberto Sablan. He attended Menlo College in Atherton, California, for two years. Due to the cost, he transferred to California State University at Los Angeles. At Cal State, he majored in health sciences then worked as a physician assistant. Hofschneider's wife is Susan Sablan Hofschneider and they have two children.

== Commonwealth Legislature ==
Hofschneider was first elected to the Northern Mariana Islands House of Representatives in the 1991 general election. He finished second for six seats in the third district. Later that year, after Governor Larry Guerrero purchased a $5 million generator from Mitsubishi without a budget appropriation, Hofschneider was one of three legislators to speak of impeaching the Governor. Subsequently, his home was attacked in a drive-by shooting. After the House dropped the impeachment inquiry one month after the shooting, Hofschneider attempted an audit of Mitsubishi. The audit revealed Guerrero misappropriated funds.

In 1993, Hofschneider was re-elected as an independent after being dropped from the Republican ticket in light of his criticism of Guerrero. He finished in first place in the district

In 2000, Hofschneider was running against Benigno Fitial for the position of Speaker. During the election, Jack Abramoff sent two operatives to the islands to lobby legislators on Fitial's behalf. Fitial was subsequently reelected as Speaker and Abramoff's contract was extended. During the 14th Commonwealth Legislature, Hofschneider was voted as the House Minority Leader.

In the 2018 general election, Hofschneider ran as an independent for the Northern Mariana Islands Senate in the 3rd senatorial district. He ran as an ally of the gubernatorial ticket of Juan Babauta and Rita Aldan Sablan. Hofschneider received 3,813 votes and finished fourth of five candidates for two seats.

== Runs for Governor ==
Hofschneider was a gubernatorial candidate in the 2001, 2005, 2009, and 2014 elections.

In the 2005 gubernatorial election, Hofschneider ran on a ticket with David M. Apatang. While both Hofschneider and Apatang were Republicans, they ran as independents. The 2005 election was particularly bitter as families faced divided loyalties and a record amount of money was raised and spent on attack ads. In a four-way race, the Hofschneider – Apatang ticket lost to Benigno Fitial and Timothy Villagomez of the Covenant Party by a single point.

His best gubernatorial election result came in 2009, when he was the Republican nominee for Governor of the Northern Mariana Islands in the 2009 gubernatorial election. Representative Arnold I. Palacios of Saipan, the Speaker of the House then, was Hofschneider's running mate for lieutenant governor. Hofschneider won the initial popular vote but failed to gain a majority, triggering a runoff against the incumbent, Benigno Fitial. Fitial won the runoff by 370 votes and therefore was re-elected.

Hofschneider ran a fourth time for governor in 2014 as an independent. His running mate was independent Senator Ray Yumul of Saipan. Hofschnedier lost to the incumbent, Eloy Inos.

Political offices
| Preceded by Benigno Fitial | Speaker of the Northern Mariana Islands House of Representatives; 2002–2004 | Succeeded by Benigno Fitial |
Party political offices
| Preceded by Juan Babauta | Republican nominee for Governor of the Northern Mariana Islands; 2009 | Succeeded by Eloy Inos |
