= 2014 Northern Mariana Islands general election =

- Gubernatorial election
- November 4, 2014 (first round); November 21, 2014 (runoff)
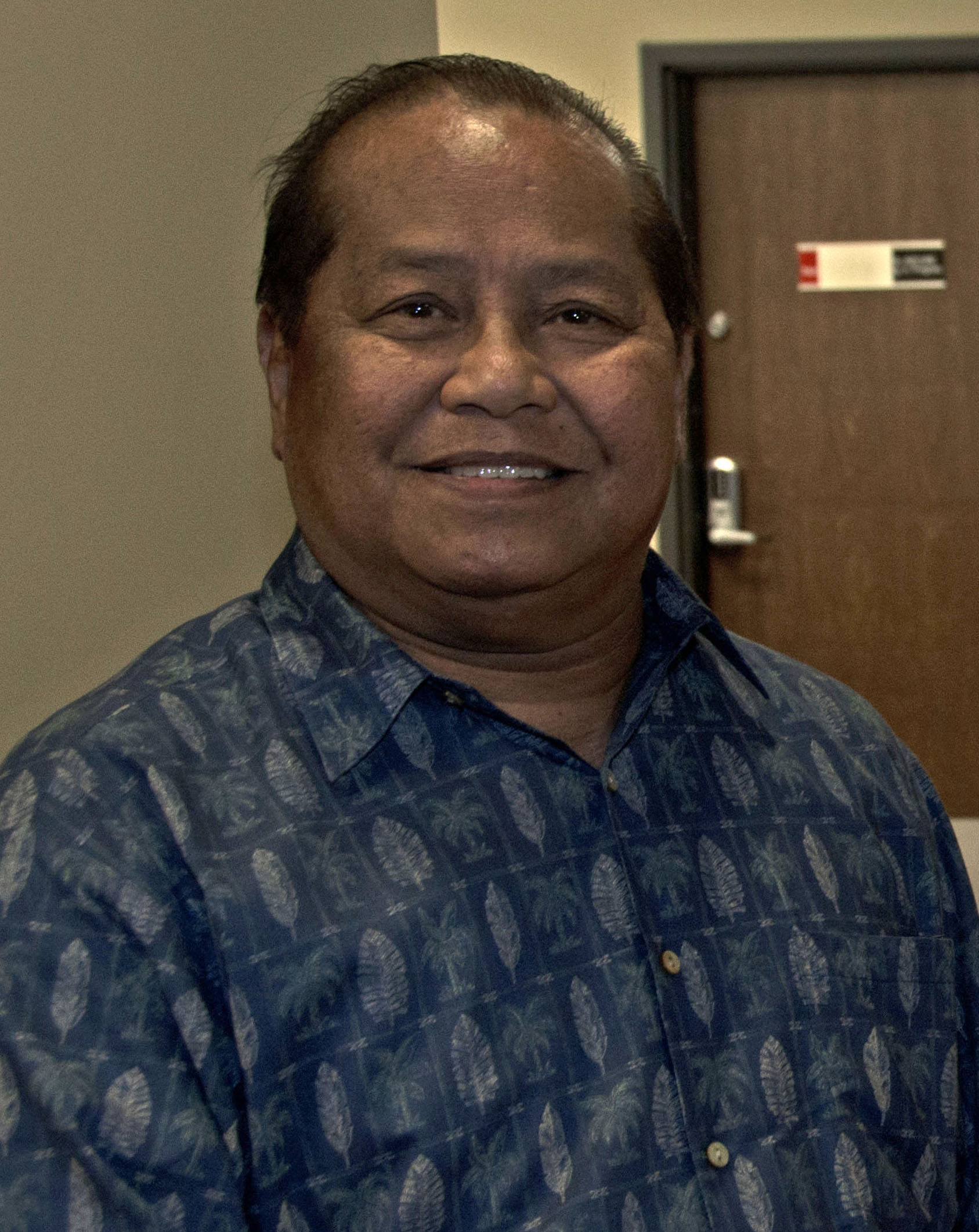

Nominee	Eloy Inos	Heinz Hofschneider
Party	Republican	Independent
Running mate	Ralph Torres	Ray Naraja Yumul
Popular vote	6,547	4,948
Percentage	56.96%	43.04%
- Results by voting district: Eloy Inos: 50–55% 55–60% 60–65% 65–70% >95% Heinz Hofschneider: 50–55%
Governor before election
Eloy Inos
Republican
Elected Governor
Eloy Inos
Republican
- Delegate election
- November 4, 2014
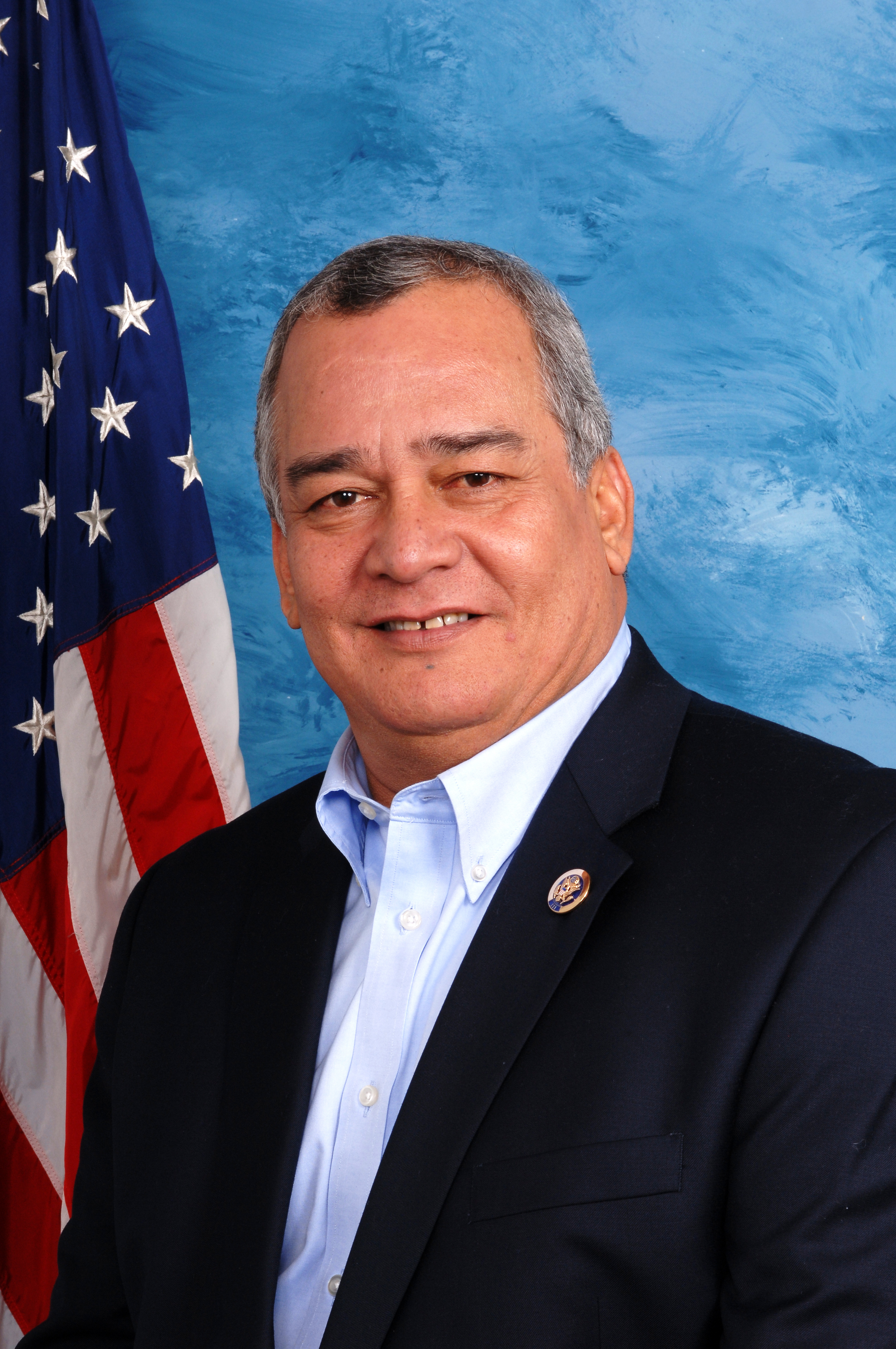

Nominee	Gregorio Sablan	Andrew Sablan Salas
Party	Independent	Democratic
Popular vote	8,549	4,547
Percentage	65.28%	34.72%
- Results by voting district: Gregorio Sablan: 50–55% 55–60% 60–65% 65–70% 80–85% Andrew Salas: 60–65%
Delegate before election
Gregorio Sablan
Independent
Elected Delegate
Gregorio Sablan
Independent
- Senate election
- 6 of the 9 seats in the Senate; 5 seats needed for a majority
Party	Vote %	Seats	+/–
Republican	46.01	7	+2
Independents	50.20	2	−2
This lists parties that won seats. See the complete results below.
- House election
- All 20 seats in the House of Representatives; 11 seats needed for a majority
Party	Vote %	Seats	+/–
Republican	33.38	7	+3
Independents	61.88	13	+1
This lists parties that won seats. See the complete results below.

General elections were held in the Northern Mariana Islands on November 4, 2014. The elections coincided with the 2014 United States midterm elections. Voters in the Northern Mariana Islands voted for the governor of the Northern Mariana Islands, the non-voting delegate to the United States House of Representatives, attorney general, 6 seats in the Northern Mariana Islands Senate, all twenty seats in the Northern Mariana Islands House of Representatives, 4 mayors, seats for the municipal council, and seats for the board of education. Additionally, a referendum involving changes to the constitution was held.

Incumbent Republican governor Eloy Inos was re-elected, facing two independent challengers and one Democratic challenger. The next lieutenant governor was elected on the same ticket, with incumbent Jude Hofschneider not running for re-election. As no candidate got a majority, a runoff was held on November 21, 2014. This election was the first time since 2001 that the Covenant Party, which dissolved in 2013, was not on the ballot. It also marked the first time since 1999 that only two political parties would compete in the elections, marking a return to a two-party system similar to that of the United States rather than the multi-party system, which began back in 1999 when the now dissolved Reform Party was first formed and went on to win a stunning victory by managing to elect Senator Ramon Deleon Guerrero to the senate, that had defined the CNMI for nearly 15 years. The Democratic Party would not win a single seat in the legislature until 2020 and would not compete for the governorship until 2022. This election was the third time in a row that candidate Heinz Hofschneider finished second in the gubernatorial elections. As of 2025, this was the last time he contested for the gubernatorial elections.

== Background ==
The previous election was held in 2009 for a 5-year term, in order to move all elections to even years. Covenant Party candidate Benigno Repeki Fitial was re-elected; his running mate Eloy Inos was elected to his first full term as lieutenant governor. Fitial resigned as governor in February 2013 in the face of impeachment hearings. Inos thus became governor. In September 2013, he took steps to merge the Covenant Party with the territorial Republican Party, and ran for re-election as a Republican.

== Electoral system ==
The Northern Mariana Islands Senate is the upper house of the Northern Mariana Islands Commonwealth Legislature, consisting of nine senators representing three senatorial districts (Saipan & the Northern Islands, Tinian & Aguijan, and Rota), each a multi-member district with three senators. Each district had two seats open for the 2014 elections. The third district also hosted a special election for one seat.

The Northern Mariana Islands House of Representatives is the lower house of the Northern Mariana Islands Commonwealth Legislature. The house has seven districts and five of the seven are Multi-member district.

== Candidates ==
=== Gubernatorial election ===
Eloy Inos, the incumbent republican governor was re-elected. He was challenged by the speaker of the house and 2009 candidate, Heinz Sablan Hofschneider, former governor Juan Babauta (both running as independents), and democratic candidate Edward Masga Deleon Guerrero, former ports authority executive director.

- Juan Babauta, former governor (2002–2006), running as an independent
  - Running mate: Juan Torres, former senator
- Edward "Tofila" Masga Deleon Guerrero, former Ports Authority executive director, running as a Democrat
  - Running mate: Danny Quitugua, former representative
- Heinz Sablan Hofschneider, 2009 candidate and Speaker of the House, running as an independent
  - Running mate: Ray Naraja Yumul, senator (I-Saipan)
- Eloy Songao Inos, incumbent governor, running as a Republican
  - Running mate: Senate President Ralph DLG. Torres (R-Saipan)

=== US delegate ===
Incumbent Delegate Gregorio Sablan filed for re-election. Sablan caucuses with the Democratic Party, but ran as an independent. He was first elected in 2008, upon the creation of the Northern Mariana Islands' delegate seat for the U.S. House of Representatives.

Sablan was challenged by Democrat Andrew Sablan Salas.

== Campaign ==
=== Endorsements ===
Delegate Gregorio Sablan was endorsed by House Minority Whip Rep. Steny Hoyer (D-Maryland) in October 2014.

== Results ==
=== Governor ===
Candidate	Running mate	Party	First round		Second round	
Candidate	Running mate	Party	Votes	%	Votes	%
Eloy Inos	Ralph Torres	Republican Party	6,342	45.96	6,547	56.96
Heinz Hofschneider	Ray Yumul	Independent	4,501	32.62	4,948	43.04
Juan Babauta	Juan Torres	Independent	2,414	17.50		
Edward Guerrero	Daniel Quitugua	Democratic Party	541	3.92		
Total			13,798	100.00	11,495	100.00
Source: Commonwealth Election Commission

=== Delegate to the US House of Representatives ===
Incumbent Delegate Gregorio Sablan was re-elected. He caucuses with the Democratic Party, but ran as an independent. Sablan was challenged by democrat Andrew Salas, a former territorial representative and Commerce Secretary. While not quite as massive as his 2012 victory, Sablan managed to win yet another landslide with nearly two-thirds of the vote over his Democratic competitor.

Candidate	Party	Votes	%
Gregorio Sablan	Independent	8,549	65.28
Andrew Salas	Democratic Party	4,547	34.72
Total		13,096	100.00
Source: Commonwealth Election Commission

=== House of Representatives ===
Party	Votes	%	Seats	+/–
Republican Party	13,955	33.38	7	+3
Democratic Party	1,981	4.74	0	0
Independents	25,873	61.88	13	+1
Total	41,809	100.00	20	0
Source: Commonwealth Election Commission

==== By district ====
House of Representative - District 1: Saipan (6 seats)
Party	Candidate	Votes	%
Republican	Angel Aldan Demapan	1,935	10.53%
Independent	Edwin Kenneth Propst	1,585	8.63%
Republican	Joseph "Leepan" Tenorio Guerrero (incumbent)	1,537	8.36%
Independent	Roman Cepeda Benavente (incumbent)	1,508	8.21%
Independent	Joseph Pinaula Deleon Guerrero	1,424	7.75%
Independent	Antonio Pangelinan Sablan (incumbent)	1,354	7.37%
Republican	Gregorio Muna Sablan, Jr.	1,271	6.92%
Independent	Richard Benavente Seman (incumbent)	1,225	6.67%
Independent	Joseph Arriola Flores	1,202	6.54%
Independent	Mariano Taitano (incumbent)	1,129	6.14%
Independent	Rose Nelly Taman Ada-Hocog	1,025	5.58%
Independent	John Magofna Pialur	1,025	5.58%
Democratic	Frankie Fernando Angel	667	3.63%
Democratic	Vincent Go Cabrera	422	2.30%
Independent	Benjamin Matagolai Cepeda	381	2.07%
Democratic	Calistro Iguel Reyes	372	2.02%
Democratic	Nelson Ayuyu Rios	313	1.70%
Total votes		18,375	100.00%

House of Representative - District 2: Saipan (2 seats)
Party	Candidate	Votes	%
Republican	John Paul Palacios Sablan (incumbent)	595	34.02%
Republican	Rafael Sablan Demapan (incumbent)	578	33.05%
Independent	Vicente Aldan Ichihara	369	21.10%
Democratic	Bruce Jarrett Manglona	207	11.84%
Total votes		1,749	100.00%

House of Representative - District 3: Saipan (6 seats)
Party	Candidate	Votes	%
Independent	Edmund Joseph Sablan Villagomez (incumbent)	1,473	11.43%
Independent	Blas Jonathan "BJ" Tenorio Attao	1,455	11.29%
Independent	Ralph Naraja Yumul (incumbent)	1,358	10.54%
Independent	Ramon Anagailen Tebuteb (incumbent)	1,300	10.09%
Independent	Anthony Tenorio Benavente (incumbent)	1,240	9.62%
Republican	Felicidad Taman Ogumoro (incumbent)	1,230	9.55%
Independent	Francisco Santos Dela Cruz (incumbent)	1,178	9.14%
Republican	Stanley Estanislao Tudela McGinnis Torres	1,028	7.98%
Republican	Maryann Agulto Borja-Arriola	995	7.72%
Republican	Vincente Castro Camacho	971	7.54%
Republican	Susana Blas Deelon Guerrero	658	5.11%
Total votes		12,886	100.00%

House of Representative - District 4: Saipan (2 seats)
Party	Candidate	Votes	%
Independent	Vinson Edward Flores Sablan	813	33.28%
Republican	George Norita Camacho (incumbent)	568	23.25%
Independent	Diego Litulumar Kaipat	544	22.27%
Independent	Christopher Duenas Leon Guerrero (incumbent)	518	21.20%
Total votes		2,443	100.00%

House of Representative - District 5: Saipan (2 seats)
Party	Candidate	Votes	%
Independent	Francis Songsong Taimanao	964	27.38%
Independent	Lorenzo Iglecuas Deleion Guerrero (incumbent)	839	23.88%
Republican	Antonio Reyes Agulto (incumbent)	660	18.74%
Independent	Jose Sablan Demapan	543	15.42%
Republican	Francisco Concepcion Aguon	515	14.63%
Total votes		3,521	100.00%

House of Representative - District 6: Tinian (1 seat)
Party	Candidate	Votes	%
Independent	Edwin Palacios Aldan	748	53.01%
Republican	Charlene Manglona Lizama	663	46.99%
Total votes		1,411	100.00%
Independent hold			

House of Representative - District 7: Rota (1 seat)
Party	Candidate	Votes	%
Republican	Glenn Lizama Maratita	751	52.74%
Independent	Thomas Lee Atalig Manglona	673	47.26%
Total votes		1,424	100.00%
Republican hold			

=== Senate ===
Party	Votes	%	Seats			
Party	Votes	%	Won	Not up	Total	+/–
Republican Party	16,328	46.01	6	1	7	+2
Democratic Party	1,345	3.79	0	0	0	0
Independents	17,817	50.20	1	1	2	–2
Total	35,490	100.00	7	2	9	0
Source: Commonwealth Election Commission

==== By district ====
Rota 1st Senatorial District (2 seats)
Party	Candidate	Votes	%
Republican	Teresita Apatang Santos	786	28.17%
Republican	Steven King Mesngon	687	24.62%
Independent	Paul Atalig Manglona	633	22.69%
Independent	Jovita Maratita Taimanao (incumbent)	492	17.63%
Independent	Tom Glenn A. Quitugua	192	6.88%
Total votes		2,790	100.00%

Tinian 2nd Senatorial District (2 seats)
Party	Candidate	Votes	%
Republican	Francisco Quichuchu Cruz (incumbent)	768	27.64%
Republican	Jude Untalan Hofschneider (incumbent)	726	26.12%
Independent	Trenton Brian Conner	644	23.17%
Independent	Joaquin Hoashi Borja	641	23.07%
Total votes		2,779	100.00%

Saipan 3rd Senatorial District (2 seats)
Party	Candidate	Votes	%
Independent	Justo Songao Quitugua	4,542	23.17%
Republican	Arnold I. Palacios	3,774	19.26%
Republican	Oscar Manglona Babauta	3,684	18.80%
Independent	Janet Ulloa Maratita	3,244	16.55%
Independent	Iluminanda Reyes Bermudes	2,172	11.08%
Democratic	Jesus Ilo Taisague	1,345	6.86%
Independent	Stephen Carl Woodruff	798	4.07%
Total votes		19,599	100.00%

Saipan 3rd Senatorial District (Special Election) (1 seat)
Party	Candidate	Votes	%
Republican	Sixto Kaipat Igisomar	5,903	56.97%
Independent	Jesus Manibusan Castro	3,059	29.52%
Independent	Roy Taisacan Rios	1,400	13.51%
Total votes		10,362	100.00%

=== Mayors ===
All four mayoral posts were up for election across the Commonwealth.

On June 2, 2014, incumbent Saipan mayor Donald Flores, then in his second term, died in office following a stroke. Governor Eloy Inos appointed Marian Deleon Guerrero Tudela as acting Mayor of Saipan on June 3, 2014, to serve for the remainder of Flores' unexpired term, which would end in January 2015. Ramon B. Camacho, the chairman of the Saipan and Northern Islands Municipal Council, served as acting mayor until Tudela could return from Arizona to take the oath of office. Tudela had been living in Arizona at the time of her appointment in order to take care of her great-granddaughter. Inos cited her second place finish in the 2009 mayoral election as a reason for her appointment. She promised to retain all of Flores' existing staff during her term. Marian Tudela was sworn into office on June 8, 2014, by Governor Eloy Inos during a ceremony at the Coral Ocean Point Resort. She became the first female mayor of Saipan, as well as the first female mayor of any municipality in the Northern Mariana Islands in history. Tudela declined to run for a full term.

Saipan
Candidate	Party	Votes	%
David M. Apatang	Independent	4,206	40.15
Ramon Camacho	Independent	2,955	28.21
Joseph Reyes	Republican Party	2,359	22.52
Antonio Mareham	Democratic Party	955	9.12
Total		10,475	100.00
Source: Commonwealth Election Commission

Tinian
Candidate	Party	Votes	%
Joey San Nicolas	Republican Party	703	48.65
Ramon Muna Dela Cruz	Independent (Note: Ramon Muna Dela Cruz switched his affiliation from Republican to Independent before the elections)	696	48.17
David Mendiola Cing	Democratic Party	46	3.18
Total		1,445	100.00
Source: Commonwealth Election Commission

Rota
Candidate	Party	Votes	%
Efraim Manglona Atalig	Republican Party	797	52.30
Melchor Atalig Mendiola	Independent	727	47.70
Total		1,524	100.00
Source: Commonwealth Election Commission

Northern Islands
Candidate	Party	Votes	%
Francisco Jerome Kaipat Aldan	Republican Party	94	60.65
Vicente Jr. Cruz Santos	Independent	61	39.35
Total		155	100.00
Source: Commonwealth Election Commission

=== Attorney General ===
This was the first election in which the Attorney General was an elected position. Edward Manibusan, the former presiding judge of the Superior Court, defeated attorney Michael N. Evangelista handily. Manibusan won all but Tanapag and Rota in the general election.

Candidate	Votes	%
Edward Manibusan	8,599	64.80
Michael Evangelista	4,672	35.20
Total	13,271	100.00
Source: Commonwealth Election Commission

=== Municipal councils ===
Municipal Council - Saipan & Northern Islands (non-partisan)
Party	Candidate	Votes	%
Nonpartisan	Lareiana Castro Camacho	6,211	27.84%
Nonpartisan	Antonia Manibusan Tudela (incumbent)	5,660	25.37%
Nonpartisan	Alice Santos Igitol	5,455	24.46%
Nonpartisan	Isidoro Tudela Cabrera	4,980	22.33%
Total votes		22,306	100.00%

Municipal Council - Tinian & Aguiguan (non-partisan)
Party	Candidate	Votes	%
Nonpartisan	Diana Hocog Borja	889	20.95%
Nonpartisan	Edwin Manglona Hofschneider	809	19.07%
Nonpartisan	Raynaldo Mendoila Cing (incumbent)	730	17.20%
Nonpartisan	Antonio San Nicolas Borja (incumbent)	655	15.44%
Nonpartisan	Fritz Mendiola San Nicolas	594	14.00%
Nonpartisan	Esteven Pangelinan Cabrera (incumbent)	566	13.34%
Total votes		4,243	100.00%

Municipal Council - Rota (non-partisan)
Party	Candidate	Votes	%
Nonpartisan	Ivan Jr. Mereb	890	22.49%
Nonpartisan	George Ogo Hocog (incumbent)	811	20.49%
Nonpartisan	Roman Mendiola Calvo	775	19.58%
Nonpartisan	Joseph Manglona Ogo	640	16.17%
Nonpartisan	Michael Babauta Manglona	604	15.26%
Nonpartisan	Juan Atalig Barcinas	238	6.01%
Total votes		3,958	100.00%

=== Board of Education ===
Board of Education - Saipan & Northern Islands (non-partisan)
Party	Candidate	Votes	%
Nonpartisan	Herman Tenorio	8,665	100.00%
Total votes		8,665	100.00%

Board of Education - Tinian & Aguiguan
Party	Candidate	Votes	%
Nonpartisan	Florine Mendiola Hofschneider	918	66.43%
Nonpartisan	Martin Matagolai Sakisat	464	33.57%
Total votes		1,382	100.00%

=== Referendum ===
The general elections included three referendum questions, two of which involved legislative initiative amendments to the constitution. The constitutional amendments were to:

- article XV, subsection 1(e) of the constitution to increase the minimum proportion of the Commonwealth general-revenue budget spent on primary and secondary education from 15% to 25%. H.L.I. 18-12.
- amend article XII, section 4 to redefine "persons of Northern Mariana Islands descent" as being someone who has "some degree of Northern Mariana Chamorro or Northern Mariana Carolinan blood", as opposed to the current requirement of at least 25% bloodline. H.L.I. 18-1.

An amendment proposed by legislative initiative shall become effective if approved by a majority of the votes cast. N.M.I. Const. art. XVIII, § 5(b).

The other referendum asked voters whether a Constitutional Convention should be convened to propose amendments to the constitution. H.B. 18-5.

The Constitutional Convention proposal would have required two-thirds of the votes cast to be approved. N.M.I. Const. art. XVIII, § 2(c).

Questions	For		Against		Outcome
Questions	Votes	%	Votes	%	Outcome
Calling a Constitutional Convention	7,859	66.01	4,046	33.99	Failed to meet two-third quorum in favour
Constitutional amendment on education spending	8,082	66.56	4,060	33.44	Approved
Constitutional amendment on the definition of descent	6,177	52.34	5,624	47.66	Approved
Source: Commonwealth Election Commission
