= Juan Babauta =

Northern Mariana Islander politician

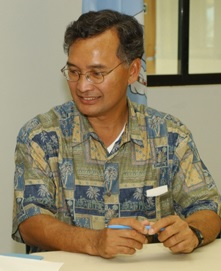

6th Governor of the Northern Mariana Islands
- In office January 14, 2002 – January 9, 2006
- Lieutenant: Diego Benavente
- Preceded by: Pedro Tenorio
- Succeeded by: Benigno Fitial

3rd Resident Representative of the Northern Mariana Islands
- In office January 8, 1990 – January 14, 2002
- Preceded by: Froilan Tenorio
- Succeeded by: Pedro Agulto Tenorio

Personal details
- Born: Juan Nekai Babauta; September 7, 1953 (age 73) Tanapag, Mariana Islands, Trust Territory of the Pacific Islands
- Party: Republican (before 2014); Independent (2014–present)
- Spouse(s): Diana Chong (div. 2002) Charlene Mendiola Tudela (m. 2008)
- Education: Eastern New Mexico University (BA, MA); University of Cincinnati (MS)

Juan Nekai Babauta (born September 7, 1953) is a Northern Mariana Islander politician who served as the sixth governor of the Northern Mariana Islands from January 14, 2002, to January 9, 2006. He served as a Republican in office.

== Biography ==
=== Early life and education ===
Juan Babauta was born in Tanapag, Saipan, Northern Mariana Islands on September 7, 1953. He is the oldest of his family's nine children. Babauta completed elementary school on Saipan. His parents then sent him to the mainland United States to continue his education. Babuata moved to Enosburg Falls, Vermont, where he attended Enosburg Falls High School while living on a dairy farm with a host family for three years. Babauta, who was student body president during his senior year and a member of the National Honors Society, graduated from Enosburg in 1972.

Babauta attended a summer session at Johnson State College of Vermont in 1976. He received a Bachelor of Science degree in American history and political science from Eastern New Mexico University in 1976 and a Master of Arts in political science from ENMU that same year. In 1979, Babauta completed a Master of Science degree in health planning and administration from the University of Cincinnati.

=== Career ===
Babauta's interest in health planning began when he worked as a health planner for the Trust Territory of the Pacific Islands from April to August 1977, based on Saipan. He became the executive director for the Commonwealth Health Planning and Development Agency in May 1979 after completing his master's degree at the University of Cincinnati. He remained executive director until January 1986.

Babauta was elected to the Northern Mariana Islands Senate in November 1985 representing the 3rd Senatorial District, which encompassed Saipan and the Northern Islands Municipality. He took office in January 1986 and served for one, four-year term in the Fifth and Sixth Northern Marianas Commonwealth Legislatures. He served as the Senate floor leader from January 1986 to January 1988 and the chairman of the Fiscal Affairs committee from January 1986 until August 1987. Babauta also chaired the Committee on Health, Education and Welfare from January 1986 and January 1990 and the Committee on Rules and Procedure from January 1988 until he left office in January 1990. Babauta introduced The Education Act of 1988 as a Senator.

=== Resident Representative ===
In November 1989, Babauta was elected as the third Resident Representative of the Northern Mariana Islands in Washington D.C. He took office in January 1990, succeeding Froilan Tenorio. He served as Resident Representative for three 4-year terms from January 1990 until leaving office in January 2002 to become governor.

=== Governor of the Northern Mariana Islands ===
In November 2001, Babauta was elected Governor of the Northern Mariana Islands in the four-way gubernatorial election as a Republican. Babauta and his running mate, Diego Benavente, won the election with 5,512 votes, the largest number of votes ever received by a gubernatorial candidate in the Northern Mariana Islands at the time. He defeated Covenant Party candidate Benigno Fitial, Democrat Jesus Borja and former Governor and then Reform Party candidate Froilan Tenorio, respectively. Babauta and Benavente were sworn into office on January 14, 2002.

Babauta was defeated for re-election in the 2005 gubernatorial election. The Republican party refused to hold a primary against former Speaker (2002-2004) Heinz Hofschneider. Babauta and Benavente eventually came in third place in the gubernatorial election, behind Covenant Party candidate Benigno Fitial and Hofschneider, running as an independent, in an election that marked the worst defeat for the Republican Party in its history. Benigno Fitial was elected Governor over independent Heinz Hofschneider by just 99 votes after fifteen days tallying absentee ballots, the closest gubernatorial election in Northern Mariana Islands history at the time. Fitial won with 3809 votes (28.07%) while independent Hofschneider came in a close second with 3,710 votes (27.33%). Babauta placed a disappointing third place with 3,610 votes, or 26.66%. Froilan Tenorio came in fourth with 2442 votes (17.99%). In a concession speech at his home, Babauta told supporters, "Nobody's to blame but me." Babauta left office on January 9, 2006.

Four years later, Babauta unsuccessfully sought the Republican nomination in the 2009 gubernatorial election with running mate, Galvin S. Deleon Guerrero, the principal at Mount Carmel School. Babauta was defeated in the Republican primary election on June 27, 2009, by Heinz Hofschneider. Hofschneider received 3,382 votes in the primary election, while Babauta garnered 2,986 votes. Babauta reiterated a unity pledge with Hofschneider after the primary and endorsed Hofschneider in his bid for the governorship.

=== Subsequent career ===
Babauta also worked as the publisher of Homeland Magazine from 2007 until 2009.

In April 2010, Babauta declared his candidacy for Northern Mariana Islands' Delegate to the United States House of Representatives as a Republican against incumbent Rep. Gregorio Kilili Sablan. Babauta faced Sablan, as well as Democrat Jesus Borja and Covenant candidate Joseph Camacho in the 2010 United States House of Representatives election in the Northern Mariana Islands on November 2, 2010. Sablan won re-election to a second term, while Babauta placed third in the race.

In 2014, Babauta decided to run for governor against incumbent Republican Eloy Inos as an independent. He cited the refusal of the Republican party to hold a primary as his reasoning, along with the introduction of casino gambling. His running mate was former Senator Juan Sablan Torres.

In 2018, Babauta again decided to run for governor as an independent, against Republican incumbent Ralph Torres. This time his running mate was former Education Commissioner Rita Aldan Sablan. He lost against Torres by a 62.2% to 37.8% margin.

== See also ==
- List of Asian Americans and Pacific Islands Americans in the United States Congress

U.S. House of Representatives
Preceded by Froilan Tenorio	Resident Representative of the Northern Mariana Islands; 1990–2002	Succeeded by Pedro Tenorio
Party political offices
Preceded by Pedro Tenorio	Republican nominee for Governor of the Northern Mariana Islands; 2001, 2005	Succeeded by Heinz Hofschneider
Preceded by Joe Inos; Withdrew	Democratic nominee for Governor of the Northern Mariana Islands; Endorsed; 2018	Succeeded by Tina Sablan
Political offices
Preceded by Pedro Tenorio	Governor of the Northern Mariana Islands; 2002–2006	Succeeded by Benigno Fitial
