= Maria Frica Pangelinan =

Northern Mariana Islands politician (born 1948)

Maria "Frica" Tudela Pangelinan (born December 5, 1948) is a Northern Mariana Islander politician. She is the first female senator to serve in the Northern Mariana Islands Senate.

She graduated from the University of Guam in 1981 with a BBA. While attending college, she served as acting director of finance. She was elected as a delegate to the CNMI's second constitutional convention.

Pangelinan is a member of the Democratic Party of the Northern Mariana Islands. In the 2018 Northern Mariana Islands gubernatorial election, Pangelinan endorsed Republican incumbent Ralph Torres.
