= Jose R. Lifoifoi =

Northern Mariana Islander politician

Speaker of the Northern Mariana Islands House of Representatives
- In office January 13, 1986 – 1988
- Preceded by: Vicente M. Sablan
- Succeeded by: Pedro Deleon Guerrero

Personal details
- Born: October 26, 1936 South Seas Mandate
- Died: May 18, 2020 (aged 83) Garapan, Northern Mariana Islands
- Political party: Republican
- Spouse(s): Amalia (her death); Cecilia
- Children: 7
- Education: University of Guam
- Profession: Politician; Businessman

Jose Rebuenog Lifoifoi Sr. (October 26, 1936 – May 18, 2020) was a Northern Mariana Islander politician. He served as a Republican member of the Northern Mariana Islands House of Representatives.

== Life and career ==
Jose Rebuenog Lifoifoi Sr. was born October 26, 1936, in what was then the South Seas Mandate.

He went to Guam College for a time until his father's disability forced him to return to the Northern Mariana Islands. After returning from Guam, he was employed by the Mariana Islands Housing Authority and later as a Housing Officer with the Trust Territory of the Pacific Islands government.

Lifoifoi was a Refaluwasch leader. He served in the House of Representatives from January 1978 to January 1988. On January 13, 1986, he was elected Speaker of the House, succeeding Vicente Masga "Ben" Sablan. He served as Speaker for the 5th Commonwealth Legislature. In the mid-to-late 1990s, he served as a senior advisor on CNMI and Micronesia-issues to Governors Carl Gutierrez of Guam and Pedro Pangelinan Tenorio of the CNMI.

In 2001, Thomas Remengesau Jr., as the President of Palau, appointed Lifoifoi the honorary consul general to the CNMI. He later was made an honorary citizen of Palau. Lifoifoi died on May 18, 2020, at the age of 83.
