= Oscar M. Babauta =

Northern Mariana Islands politician (1954–2025)

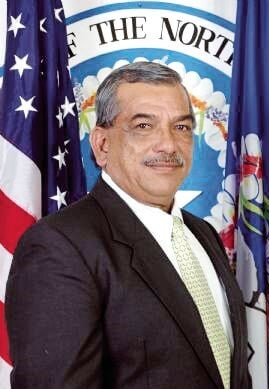

Speaker of the Northern Mariana Islands House of Representatives
- In office January 9, 2006 – January 14, 2008
- Preceded by: Benigno Fitial
- Succeeded by: Arnold Palacios

Personal details
- Born: December 29, 1954
- Died: March 17, 2025 (aged 70); Tamuning, Guam, U.S.
- Political party: Covenant (before 2013)
- Spouse: Lolita Babauta
- Children: 4

Oscar Manglona Babauta (December 29, 1954 – March 17, 2025) was a politician from the Northern Marianas Islands who served as the 12th Speaker of the Northern Mariana Islands House of Representatives during the 15th Commonwealth Legislature.

== Life and career ==
Babauta was born on December 29, 1954. In 2000, he was serving as House Floor Leader and sponsored a bill that would amend the Weapons Control Act to allow the use of firearms on shooting resorts. Proponents of the bill stated that it would lure investors while detractors of the bill worried it would harm public safety. The House approved the bill on a narrow vote.

During the administration of Governor Eloy Inos, he served as Secretary of the Department of Public Lands. He continued in that position under Governor Benigno R. Fitial until Fitial fired him for endorsing incumbent Gregorio Sablan for reelection to Congress. In the early months of his administration, Governor Arnold Palacios appointed Babauta as the special assistant for administration.

Babauta died on March 17, 2025, at the age of 70 at the Guam Memorial Hospital.
