= Josie Fitial =

First Lady of the Northern Mariana Islands

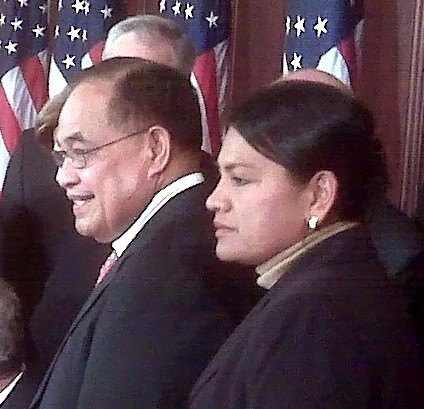
- Josie Fitial in 2009

First Lady of the Northern Mariana Islands
- In role January 9, 2006 – February 20, 2013
- Governor: Benigno Fitial
- Preceded by: Diane Babauta
- Succeeded by: Dolores Inos

Personal details
- Born: November 25, 1962 (age 63) Gapan, Nueva Ecija, Philippines
- Party: Covenant
- Spouse: Benigno Fitial
- Children: 2 children; 4 stepchildren
- Education: University of the East-Recto

Josepina "Josie" Padiermos Fitial (born November 25, 1962) is the former First Lady of the Northern Mariana Islands and the wife of former Governor Benigno Fitial. She became First Lady upon the inauguration of her husband as the 7th Governor of the Northern Mariana Islands on January 9, 2006.

== Biography ==
=== Early life ===
Fitial, who is nicknamed Josie, was born Josepina Padiermos, in 1962 in Gapan, Nueva Ecija, the Philippines. She was the oldest child of four children of a poor family. She earned her bachelor's degree in business administration from the University of the East in Manila.

Padiermos moved to the Northern Mariana Islands in 1983 to financially support her family in the Philippines. There she met her future husband, Benigno Fitial, a politician, while working as a waitress on Saipan. The couple later married and had two children, Patrick and Christina, in addition to Benigno Fitial's four children from a previous marriage, Jason, Cathy, Junella and Julie.

== First Lady of the Northern Mariana Islands ==
Benigno Fitial would later serve as the Speaker of the Northern Mariana Islands House of Representatives and the Governor of the CNMI beginning in 2006. Josie Fitial became First Lady of the Northern Mariana Islands when her husband took office on January 9, 2006.

Fitial has placed emphasis on programs and initiatives relating to education, health care, recycling and the environment, as well as children, students and the elderly. She has been named an honorary goodwill ambassador of the Red Cross, CNMI Chapter, and is a former member of the CNMI Lions Clubs International.

Fitial has established the Vision Foundation, which promotes charitable causes within the Northern Mariana Islands. A focus of Fitial's foundation has been the donations of books and other literature to CNMI public schools. Among Fitial's contributions through her organization has been the contribution of more than 500 books to the Dandan Elementary School and Japanese-language books to Saipan-Marianas High School. Fitial has also used money raised to fund senior citizen and children's programs, as well as beautification programs within the CNMI.

Additionally, Fitial has pushed recycling programs, as waste disposal is a major problem afflicting the CNMI. She has also promoted the role of the Filipino community within the Northern Mariana Islands as First Lady.

On November 12, 2008, Fitial issued a letter to the First Lady of the United States Laura Bush. In her letter, Fitial appealed to Bush to ask President George W. Bush and the federal government to halt the designation of the proposed Marianas Trench Marine National Monument in the Northern Mariana Islands. The designation was opposed by Fitial, the government of the Northern Mariana Islands, the Carolinian Affairs Advisory Committee and the Guam Legislature. All feared harm to the local economy and cultural practices if the national monument was created. In her letter, Fitial wrote that the monument designation was avoidable and appealed to Bush, "We are simple Americans, a globally responsible Commonwealth of the U.S. We honor and uphold a long tradition of coexistence with Mother Ocean. Island heritage passed down from our elders teaches us that we and nature are one." Despite the appeals, President Bush created the national monument on January 6, 2009. Both First Lady Fitial and the Governor were present for the ceremony.

In a 2009 interview with the Marianas Variety, Fitial noted that she had risen from an immigrant and waitress to having now met three U.S. Presidents - George H. W. Bush, George W. Bush and Barack Obama.

Honorary titles
Preceded by Diane Babauta	First Lady of the Northern Mariana Islands; January 6, 2006 – February 20, 2013	Succeeded by Dolores Inos
