= As Teo, Saipan =

Settlement in Saipan, Northern Mariana Islands

Coordinates: 15°11′47″N 145°45′54″E

As Teo is a settlement in Saipan, Northern Mariana Islands. It is located on the east of the island. It uses UTC+10:00 and has a population of 272 (2020 census). Its highest point is 364 feet.
