= Joaquin Pangelinan =

Northern Marianan politician

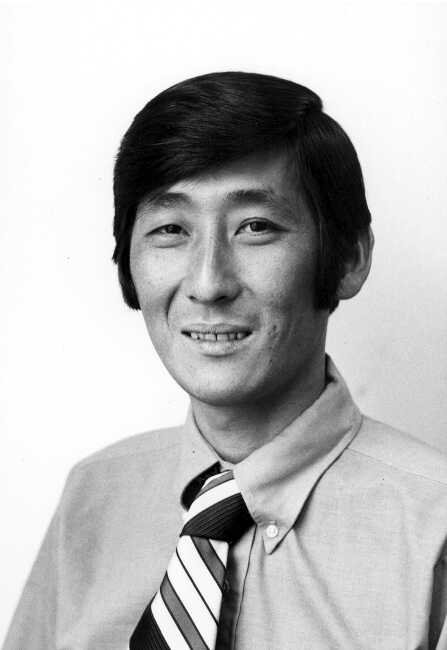
Pangelinan while Associate Director, Peace Corps Micronesia (1972)

Joaquin Ito Pangelinan also known as Mitch Pangelinan (1942 – June 28, 2013) was a politician from the Northern Mariana Islands. A signatory to the Covenant to Establish a Commonwealth of the Northern Mariana Islands in Political Union with the United States of America, he served as a member of the Northern Mariana Islands House of Representatives.

== Biography ==
He was born 1942. His biological parents died during World War II and he was subsequently adopted by his maternal uncle Francisco Sablan Pangelinan. He attended school in Guam, including College of Guam. In the 1960s, Pangelinan joined the Popular Party owing to his belief in reintegrating Guam and the Northern Mariana Islands.

He returned to Saipan and became an elementary school teacher before joining the Trust Territory of the Pacific Islands as an accountant. He later joined the staff of the Peace Corps. He was later elected to the Saipan Municipal Council. He was appointed one of the members of the Marianas Political Status Commission. After the receipt of Commonwealth status, the CNMI held its first election. Carlos S. Camacho was elected governor and appointed Pangelinan, a supporter, as an advisor with the title Special Assistant for Administration and Finance. In the 1979 election, Pangelinan was elected to the Northern Mariana Islands House of Representatives from the 6th district, which included Tanapag and San Roque. He was elected alongside Egredino "Dino" Mendiola Jones. He was the Speaker of the House during the 2nd Commonwealth Legislature. He and fellow incumbent Egredino Jones, running on the Commonwealth Popular Democratic Party slate, lost their seats in the 6th district to Republicans Jose R. Lifoifoi and Juan B. Camacho in a strong year for the Republican Party.

Pangelinan was the chairman of the Democratic Party for a period of time in the 1980s. After the Democratic Party was supplanted by the Covenant Party as one of the Northern Mariana Islands’ two major parties, Pangelinan continued to support the Democratic Party as an organization and a number of Democratic and independent candidates for public office until his death. He died June 28, 2013 at age 71.
