= List of speakers of the House of Representatives of the Northern Mariana Islands =

The Speaker of the House of Representatives of the Northern Mariana Islands is the presiding officer of the lower chamber of that legislature, in the Commonwealth of the Northern Mariana Islands (CNMI).

Order	Name	Party	CNMI Legislature	Time in office
1st	Oscar Cruz Rasa	Territorial	1st	1978–80
2nd	Joaquin Pangelinan	Democratic	2nd	1980–82
3rd	Benigno Fitial	Republican	3rd	1982-1984
4th	Vicente Masga Sablan	Democratic	4th	1984–1986
5th	Jose R. Lifoifoi	Republican	5th	1986-1988
6th	Pedro Deleon Guerrero	Democratic	6th	1988-1992
6th	Pedro Deleon Guerrero	Democratic	7th	1988-1992
7th	Thomas Pangelinan Villagomez	Republican	8th	1992–1994
8th	Diego T. Benavente	Republican	9th	1994–2000
8th	Diego T. Benavente	Republican	10th	1994–2000
8th	Diego T. Benavente	Republican	11th	1994–2000
9th	Benigno Fitial	Republican	12th	2000–2002
10th	Heinz Hofschneider	Republican	13th	2002–2004
11th	Benigno Fitial	Covenant	14th	2004–2006
12th	Oscar Manglona Babauta	Covenant	15th	2006–2008
13th	Arnold Palacios	Republican	16th	2008-2010
14th	Froilan Tenorio	Covenant	17th	2010-2011
15th	Eliceo Diaz Cabrera	Republican	17th	2011-2013
16th	Joseph Pinaula Deleon Guerrero	Republican	18th	2013-2016
16th	Joseph Pinaula Deleon Guerrero	Republican	19th	2013-2016
17th	Rafael Sablan Demapan	Republican	19th	2016-2019
17th	Rafael Sablan Demapan	Republican	20th	2016-2019
18th	Blas Jonathan Tenorio Attao	Republican	21st	2019–2021
19th	Edmund Villagomez	Independent	22nd	2021–present
19th	Edmund Villagomez	Independent	23rd	2021–present
19th	Edmund Villagomez	Independent	24th	2021–present

== See also ==
- List of Presidents of the Senate of the Northern Mariana Islands
