= Sheila Babauta =

Northern Mariana Islands politician

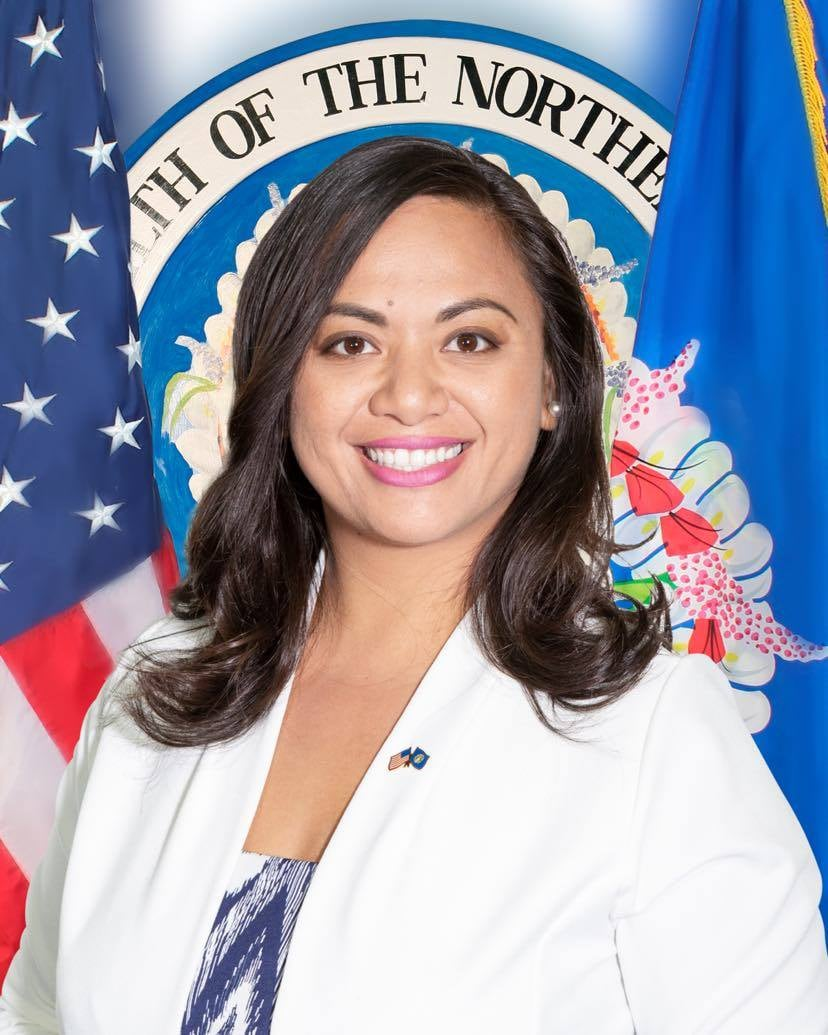
A headshot of Sheila Babuta taken at start of the 22nd Commonwealth of the Northern Mariana Islands Legislature

Sheila Therese Jack Babauta (born 1989 or 1990) is a politician from the Northern Mariana Islands and former member of the Northern Mariana Islands House of Representatives, representing District 4 for the Democratic Party.

== Early life ==
She was born in 1989 or 1990 to Diego and Dolorina Babauta. Babauta was born and grew up on the island of Saipan. In 2005 she travelled to the Washington, D.C., on a scholarship from the Close Up Foundation.

== Career ==
Babauta was elected to the Northern Mariana Islands House of Representatives, representing District 4.

In 2020, Babauta joined the Democratic Party of the Northern Mariana Islands and ran for reelection in the 2020 general election under their banner. At the start of the 22nd Commonwealth Legislature, Speaker Edmund Villagomez appointed Babauta the chairwoman of the Committee on Natural Resources and as a member of the Ad Hoc Committee on Rules.

In November 2021, she described her plans to attend the 2021 United Nations Climate Change Conference (COP 26) in Glasgow, Scotland, although the journey would be "no easy feat. Crossing the Pacific Ocean, the entire North American continent, and the Atlantic Ocean, brings me a long way from our warm island home". She said that "my brothers and sisters across the Pacific hold the keys to solve the problem of militarization, climate change, and climate colonialism. We are not passive victims. We hold solutions that are grounded in our millennia of living as kin to the land and ocean." At the conference she introduced former United States President Barack Obama when he addressed the conference, saying that he was a "son of the Asia Pacific" who "recognizes that communities impacted by climate change must have a seat at the table to ensure accountability and action from all parties who contribute major carbon emissions".

Babauta is chair of the Friends of the Mariana Trench Marine National Monument, a body which works to protect the Marianas Trench Marine National Monument centred on the Mariana Trench.
