= Vicente M. Sablan =

Vicente "Ben Pacho" Masga Sablan (July 21, 1948 - December 25, 2009) was a Northern Mariana Islander politician who served as the Speaker of the Northern Mariana Islands House of Representatives.

== Biography ==
Vicente Masga Sablan was born July 21, 1948. He was elected to the Northern Mariana Islands House of Representatives in 1979. He was reelected four times, serving until January 1990. In the 1981 election, he was the only member of Carlos S. Camacho's Commonwealth Popular Democratic Party slate to be elected in a strongly Republican year. When the Democratic Party took a majority of the legislature in the 1983 general election, he was elected speaker at the start of the Fourth Commonwealth Legislature. He took over the position from Republican Benigno Fitial, who was then chosen by the Republicans to serve as the minority leader. He served as speaker during the Fourth Commonwealth Legislature. In the 5th Commonwealth Legislature, after Democrats lost their majority in the 1985 election, he served as the minority leader. In 1989, Antonio Sablan Guerrero, a former legislator, chose Sablan as his running mate in the 1990 Democratic gubernatorial primary, ultimately losing to Froilan Tenorio and Victor Hocog.

He died December 25, 2009.
