= Pedro Deleon Guerrero =

Northern Mariana Islander politician

Pedro "Paduna" Rogolifoi Deleon Guerrero (November 3, 1943 – April 1, 2024) was a politician from the Northern Mariana Islands. He served in a variety of positions, notably as Speaker of the Northern Mariana Islands House of Representatives.
