= Political status =

Degree of a polity's sovereignty

In sociology and international law three categories of political status are usually recognized:

1. Independent nations e.g.: France, Canada
2. Autonomous states which are under the protection of another country in matters of defense and foreign affairs, e.g.: Netherlands Antilles, the Faroe Islands, British Virgin Islands etc.
3. Colonies and other dependent political units e.g. Puerto Rico.

There are, furthermore, several unrecognized countries and independence, secessionist, autonomy and nationalist movements throughout the world. See list of unrecognized countries.

== Political status in Northern Ireland ==
Political Status was an alternative name for Special Category Status.

== Political status around the world ==
- Constitutional status of Cornwall
- Constitutional status of Orkney, Shetland and the Western Isles
- Disputed status of Gibraltar
- Disputed status of the isthmus between Gibraltar and Spain
- Disputed territories of Northern Iraq
- Falkland Islands sovereignty dispute
- International recognition of Bangladesh
- International recognition of Israel
- Legal status of Alaska
- Legal status of Germany
- Legal status of Hawaii
- Legal status of the State of Palestine
- Legal status of Texas
- Legal status of the Holy See
- Political status of Abkhazia and South Ossetia
- Political status of Crimea
- Political status of Kosovo
- Political status of Nagorno-Karabakh
- Political status of Kashmir
- Political status of Puerto Rico
- Political status of Taiwan
- Political status of the Azores
- Political status of the Cook Islands and Niue
- Political status of Transnistria
- Political status of Western Sahara
- Proposed Darfurian referendum
- Secessionism in Western Australia
- Status of Jerusalem
- Status of territories captured by Israel
- Status of the Golan Heights
