= Timothy Villagomez =

Northern Marianan politician

Timothy P. Villagomez
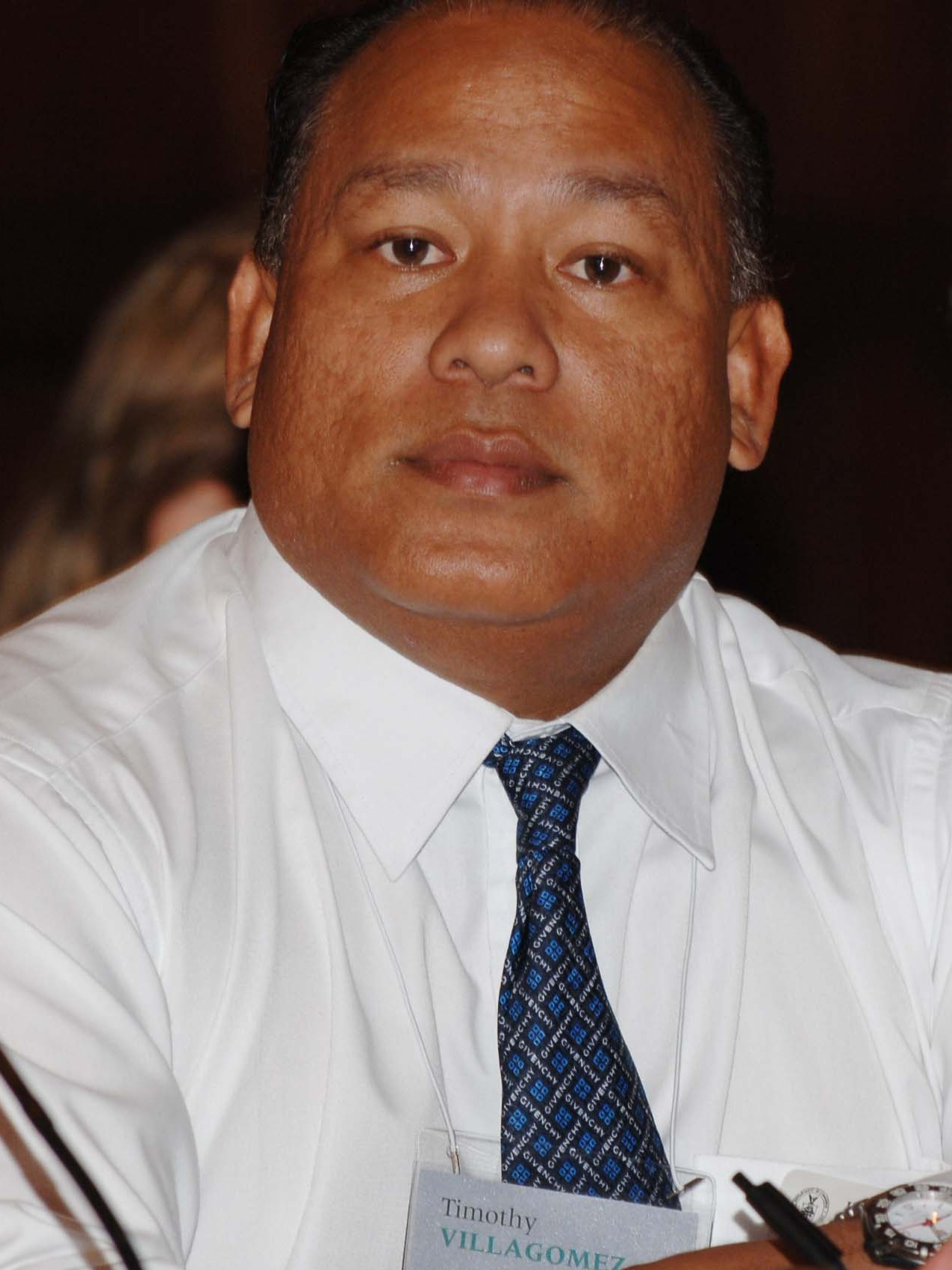
- Villagomez in May 2006

7th Lieutenant Governor of the Northern Mariana Islands
- In office January 9, 2006 – April 24, 2009
- Governor: Benigno R. Fitial
- Preceded by: Diego Benavente
- Succeeded by: Eloy S. Inos

Personal details
- Born: Timothy Pangelinan Villagomez; June 10, 1962 (age 63) Saipan, Mariana Islands, Trust Territory of the Pacific Islands
- Party: Covenant (2001-2013); Republican (pre-2001, post-2013)
- Spouse: Margaret Keene

Timothy Lewis Pangelinan Villagomez (born September 10, 1962, Saipan) is a Northern Marianan politician who served as the seventh lieutenant governor of the Northern Mariana Islands from January 9, 2006 until his resignation on April 24, 2009, under Governor Benigno R. Fitial. Villagomez took office as Lieutenant Governor on January 9, 2006, after being elected as a ticket during the 2005 gubernatorial election. Villagomez, like Fitial, was a member of the Republican Party but became a member of the Covenant Party.

== Political career ==
=== House of Representatives ===
In 2003, Villagomez was elected to the Northern Mariana Islands House of Representatives from Precinct #1. He finished second of twenty candidates for six seats. He served in the House from January 2004 to January 2006. At the start of his term, he was elected the Vice Speaker, defeating David M. Apatang with 10 votes to Apatang's 8 votes. Speaker Fitial also named him the chairman of the Committee on Public Utilities, Transportation and Communications.

=== Lieutenant governor ===
On November 4th, 2005, Benigno Fitial announced that he had selected Villagomez to be his running mate in the 2005 general election. The Fitial-Villagomez ticket won the election. He was sworn into office on January 9, 2006

== Criminal conviction ==
In August 2008, Villagomez was indicted on felony charges relating to the misuse of government funds. On April 24, 2009, he was found guilty along with former Commerce Secretary James A. Santos and his wife Joaquina V. Santos (Villagomez's sister) relating to a scheme to defraud the Commonwealth Utilities Corp. through needless purchases of a de-scaling chemical called Rydlyme. Awaiting sentencing on July 28, 2009, Villagomez tendered his resignation on April 24.

=== Sentencing ===
Villagomez's sentencing was delayed until August 5, 2009, at which time he was sentenced to 87 months in federal prison. He was sent to the Federal Correctional Institution at Phoenix, Arizona. His brother-in-law, Santos, and his wife were sentenced to 78 months. The case was appealed to the U.S. Court of Appeals for the Ninth Circuit. Villagomez was later transferred to the U.S. Penitentiary at Tucson, Arizona with a release date of June 23, 2017.

In December 2012, the Ninth Circuit vacated Villagomez's sentence citing a mistake in calculation. On June 12, 2013, Villagomez was resentenced to 108 months, an increase of 21 months from the original.

Villagomez began his term of supervised release on June 24, 2017, in the District of Idaho. At Villagomez’s request, his supervision was transferred to the U.S. Probation Office for the NMI, and is set to expire on June 23, 2020.

Political offices
Preceded by Diego Benavente	Lieutenant Governor of the Northern Mariana Islands; 2006–2009	Succeeded by Eloy Inos
