= Ralph Torres =

Northern Marianan politician (born 1979)

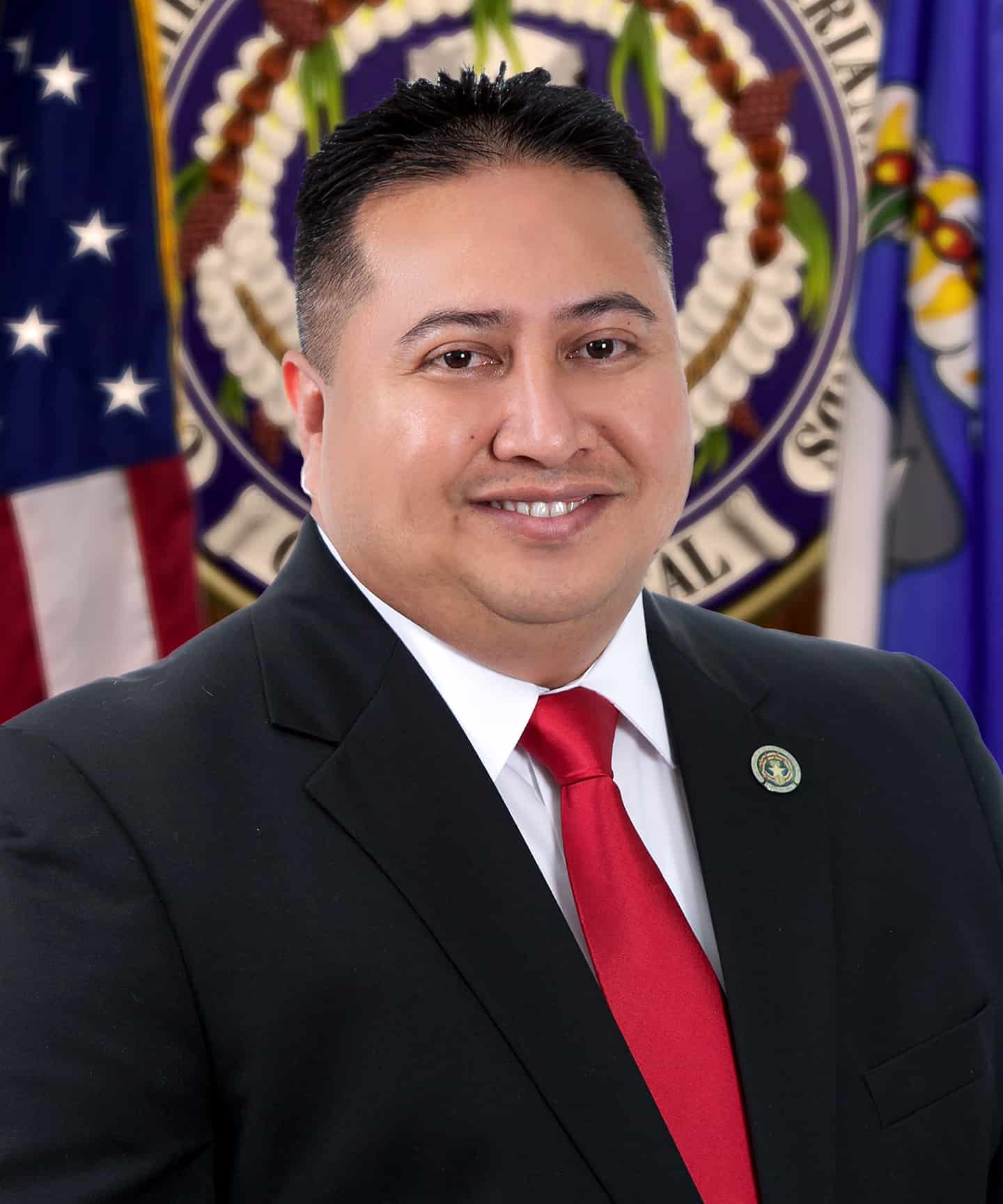
- Official portrait, 2021

Governor-elect of the Northern Mariana Islands
- Assuming office January 2027
- Lieutenant: Ben Jones (elect)
- Succeeding: David M. Apatang

9th Governor of the Northern Mariana Islands
- In office December 29, 2015 – January 9, 2023
- Lieutenant: Victor Hocog; Arnold Palacios
- Preceded by: Eloy Inos
- Succeeded by: Arnold Palacios

10th Lieutenant Governor of the Northern Mariana Islands
- In office January 11, 2015 – December 29, 2015
- Governor: Eloy Inos
- Preceded by: Jude Hofschneider
- Succeeded by: Victor Hocog

President of the Northern Mariana Islands Senate
- In office February 20, 2013 – January 12, 2015
- Preceded by: Jude Hofschneider
- Succeeded by: Victor Hocog

Personal details
- Born: Ralph Deleon Guerrero Torres; August 6, 1979 (age 47) Garapan, Trust Territory of the Pacific Islands (now Northern Mariana Islands)
- Party: Republican
- Spouse: Diann Mendiola Tudela
- Children: 6
- Education: Boise State University (BA)

Ralph Deleon Guerrero Torres (born August 6, 1979) is a Northern Marianan politician who served as the ninth governor of the Northern Mariana Islands from 2015 to 2023. A Republican and the third longest-serving governor in CNMI history, Torres took office upon the death of Governor Eloy Inos on December 29, 2015, before being elected as governor in his own right in 2018. He previously served as the tenth lieutenant governor, having been elected to that post in 2014.

== Early life and education ==
Torres was born on August 6, 1979, to a Chamorro family in Garapan, then part of the Trust Territory of the Pacific Islands. Torres's father was a government field officer and Commonwealth Utilities Corporation (CUC) dispatcher, while his mother was a teacher at William S. Reyes Elementary School. Growing up, Torres lived with his parents and five siblings in a one-story house in Koblerville built by the family.

Torres's family would later move to Boise, Idaho, where he would attend Boise High School, graduating in 1996. He received a B.S. in political science from Boise State University in 2001. In 2004, he began to work with his brothers at Torres Brothers, Attorneys at Law.

== Early political career ==
=== Commonwealth Legislature ===
In 2007, Torres won election to the Northern Mariana Islands House of Representatives as the top vote getter in District 1. In 2009, he won election to the Northern Mariana Islands Senate, acting in a variety of roles. From 2010 to 2015 he was chairman of the Health & Welfare Committee. In February 2013, he became the president of the Senate.

=== Lieutenant Governorship ===
In the 2014 gubernatorial election, Torres was elected lieutenant governor on the Republican Party ticket headed by Eloy Songao Inos, and was sworn in on January 12, 2015.

== Governorship ==
=== Tenure and elections ===
Upon the death of incumbent governor Eloy Inos, Torres became the governor of the Northern Mariana Islands on December 29, 2015. In accordance with the constitution, the Senate president, Victor Hocog, became lieutenant governor. In the 2018 gubernatorial election, Torres and his running mate Arnold Palacios won a full term, defeating former governor Juan Babauta and Rita Sablan ticket.

As governor, Torres approved a bill, public law 19-42, that adds a $1,000 excise tax on pistol purchases, this is the highest tax on pistols sales in the US. However, this excessive tax was later ruled as unconstitutional according to the United States Constitution and overturned by the United States District Court.

On September 21, 2018, Torres signed into law the Taulamwaar Sensible CNMI Cannabis Act, stating: "Today, our people made history. We took a stand to legalize marijuana in the CNMI for recreational, medical, and commercial use."

Torres announced his intention to run for reelection in the 2022 gubernatorial election with territorial senator Vinnie Sablan as his running-mate. He lost to his incumbent lieutenant governor Arnold Palacios while under indictment.

==== Controversies ====
Torres and his wife, First Lady Diann Torres, were criticized for costing the government $24,297 on a trip to Montana. The trip, conducted from June 23 to July 2, 2017, involved stops in both Oregon and Idaho. In February 2018, Bloomberg Businessweek reported that Torres and his family have received millions of dollars in payments from Hong Kong-based Imperial Pacific casino.

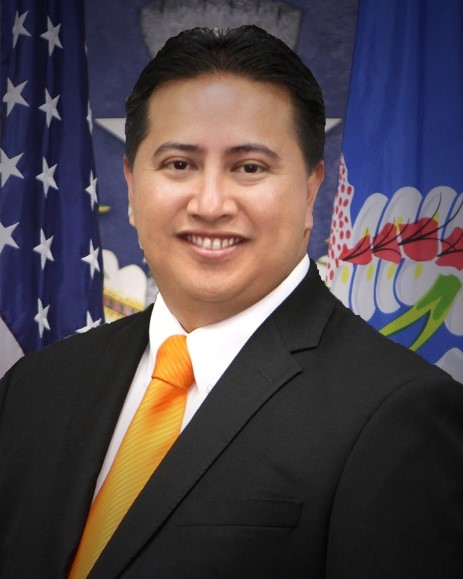
Alternate portrait of Torres

On November 7, 2019, the FBI executed a search and seizure warrant to raid Torres's office, home, and car as well as his brothers' law firm and various other businesses across Saipan for evidence of wire fraud, schemes to defraud, conspiracy, money laundering, and illegal campaign contributions.

In November 2019, the Northern Mariana Islands House of Representatives called for the impeachment of Torres amid an ongoing investigation by the FBI into his businesses. Torres faced further impeachment backlash with growing evidence of the misuse of local funds that violated CNMI procurement laws. On 11 January 2022, Ralph Torres became the second governor to have been impeached in the CNMI's history. In May 2022, Torres was acquitted of all charges by the Senate in his impeachment trial.

Torres was indicted for misconduct in public office in April 2022. His trial was originally set for July 5, 2022, but was delayed.

==== National politics ====
On March 11, 2016, Torres endorsed frontrunner Donald Trump in the 2016 Republican presidential primary. Torres criticized Trump but reiterated his support for him in the general election following the Access Hollywood controversy.

Following the victory of Democrat Joe Biden in the 2020 presidential election, Torres congratulated the president-elect and vice-president-elect Kamala Harris, while also praising Trump for his "commitment and support for the people of the Northern Mariana Islands". He added that the outgoing president "delivered time and time again for our people" through measures such as NMI U.S. Workforce Act of 2018, and praised Trump's response to the Super Typhoon Yutu. He also condemned the January 6 United States Capitol attack.

== Personal life ==
Torres has six children with his wife, the former Diann Mendiola Tudela: Ralph Anthony, Vaniqa Marie, Deon Titus, Tristan Dane, Divannie and Ryan. Torres is of Chamorro ancestry.

== See also ==
- Governor of the Northern Mariana Islands
- Lieutenant Governor of the Northern Mariana Islands

Political offices
Preceded by Jude Hofschneider	Lieutenant Governor of the Northern Mariana Islands; 2015	Succeeded by Victor Hocog
Preceded by Eloy Inos	Governor of the Northern Mariana Islands; 2015–2023	Succeeded by Arnold Palacios
Preceded by David M. Apatang	Governor of the Northern Mariana Islands; Taking office 2027	Elect
Party political offices
Preceded by Eloy Inos	Republican nominee for Governor of the Northern Mariana Islands; 2018, 2022, 2026	Most recent
