= Marianas Political Status Commission =

1972–1975 Northern Mariana governmental body

The Marianas Political Status Commission was a body composed of representatives of the Northern Mariana Islands who negotiated the political status of the Northern Mariana Islands from December 1972 until February 1975. The Commission negotiated with a delegation from the U.S. federal government, led by the Personal Representative of the President of the United States, Ambassador F. Haydn Williams, during talks which spanned 27 months. The negotiations resulted in the Covenant to Establish a Commonwealth of the Northern Mariana Islands in Political Union with the United States of America.

The proposal for the Covenant was signed by members of the Commission on February 15, 1975. The agreement was unanimously passed by the Mariana Islands District's legislature of the United Nations Trust Territory of the Pacific Islands on February 17, 1975. Voters in the Northern Mariana Islands approved the proposal in a plebiscite held on June 17, 1975, with 78.8% voting in favor of the Covenant.

The United States House of Representatives approved the Covenant on July 21, 1975, which was subsequently approved by the United States Senate on February 24, 1976. President Gerald Ford signed the bill, known as Public Law 94-241 (90 Stat. 263), into law on March 24, 1976, establishing the Covenant with the Northern Mariana Islands.

== Members of the Commission ==
- Chairman: Edward D.L.G. Pangelinan
- Vice Chairman: Vicente N. Santos
- Members of the Marianas Political Status Commission
  - Juan LG. Cabrera
  - Vicente T. Camacho
  - Jose R. Cruz
  - Bernard V. Hofschneider
  - Benjamin Manglona
  - Daniel T. Muña
  - Dr. Francisco T. Palacios
  - Joaquin Pangelinan
  - Manuel A. Sablan
  - Joannes B. Taimanao
  - Pedro Agulto Tenorio
