= Eloy Inos =

Northern Marianas politician

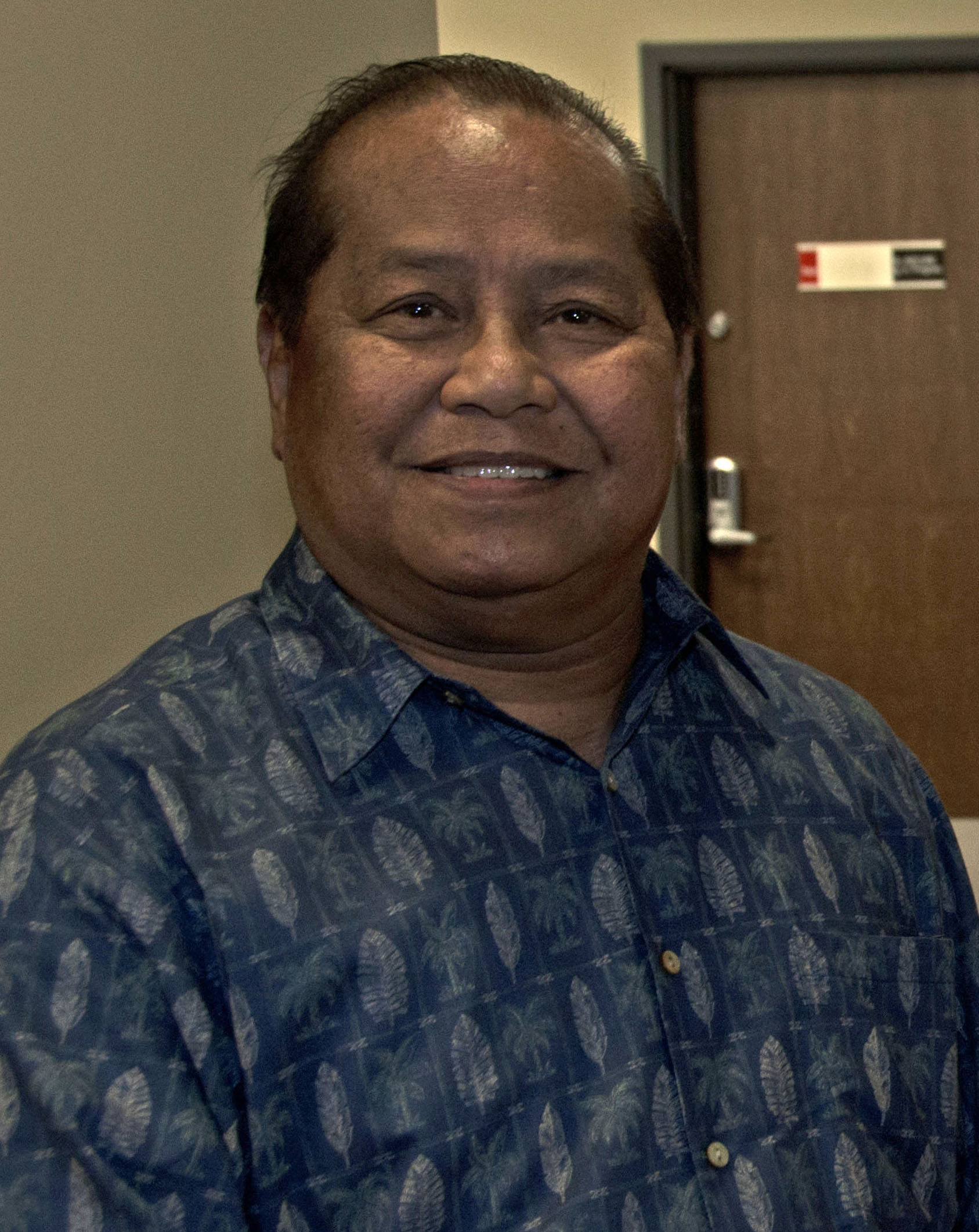
- Inos in 2013

8th Governor of the Northern Mariana Islands
- In office February 20, 2013 – December 28, 2015
- Lieutenant: Jude Hofschneider; Ralph Torres
- Preceded by: Benigno Fitial
- Succeeded by: Ralph Torres

8th Lieutenant Governor of the Northern Mariana Islands
- In office May 1, 2009 – February 20, 2013
- Governor: Benigno Fitial
- Preceded by: Timothy Villagomez
- Succeeded by: Jude Hofschneider

Personal details
- Born: Eulogio Songao Inos; September 26, 1949 Saipan, Mariana Islands, Trust Territory of the Pacific Islands
- Died: December 28, 2015 (aged 66) Seattle, Washington, U.S.
- Party: Republican (2013–2015)
- Other political affiliations: Covenant (2001–2013)
- Spouse: Dolores Agulto
- Children: 5
- Relatives: Joseph S. Inos (brother)
- Education: University of Guam (BBA)

Eulogio Songao "Eloy" Inos (September 26, 1949 – December 28, 2015) was a Northern Marianan politician who served as the eighth governor of the Northern Mariana Islands from 2013 to 2015. Inos, a member of the Republican Party, also served as the eighth lieutenant governor from 2009 to 2013.

He was nominated as lieutenant governor by Governor Benigno Fitial to fill the vacancy caused by the resignation of Lieutenant Governor Timothy Villagomez. Villagomez was convicted on federal fraud charges. Inos was confirmed by the Senate and was sworn into the lieutenant governor office on May 1, 2009. He was elected to a full term as lieutenant governor in November 2009.

Inos became governor on February 20, 2013, following the resignation of Benigno Fitial, after he was impeached by the House for fraud-related activities. Inos was elected to a full-term as governor in the 2014 gubernatorial election.

Inos died in office on December 28, 2015, local time, in Seattle, Washington, at the age of 66.

== Biography ==
=== Personal life ===
Eloy Inos attended Mount Carmel School on Saipan, graduating there from high school in May 1967. Inos obtained a bachelor's degree in accounting (cum laude) from the University of Guam in May 1981. He also studied business administration while at the University of Guam.

Inos has five children. He was the brother-in-law of the late Education Commissioner Rita Inos.

=== Career ===
Inos worked as a tax manager for the now defunct Trust Territory of the Pacific Islands' revenue division. Inos was also a former Vice President of the Tan Holdings Corporation, one of the largest garment manufacturers in the Northern Mariana Islands.

He was elected to the First Saipan and Northern Islands Municipal Council, including a stint as council chairman, from 1990 until 1992.

Inos was appointed the Secretary of Finance in the Fitial administration. As Secretary Inos oversaw the financial affairs of the Northern Mariana Islands' government, including taxation, accounting, treasury, electronic data processing, procurement and customs. Inos became Secretary on January 9, 2006, and held the post until May 1, 2009.

=== Lieutenant governor ===
Lieutenant Governor Timothy Villagomez, who had held office since 2006, issued his resignation on April 24, 2009, following his conviction on federal fraud charges. Villagomez became the highest ranking CNMI official ever convicted at the time.

According to Article III, Section 3 of the Constitution of the Commonwealth of the Northern Mariana Islands, when a vacancy is created for lieutenant governor, the governor must appoint a replacement with the confirmation of the Northern Mariana Islands Senate. On April 27, 2009, Governor Fitial nominated Inos, the then Secretary of Finance in his administration, as the new lieutenant governor to serve for the rest of Villagomez's original term in office. Fitial and Inos had first met years earlier while both were working for the government of the Trust Territory of the Pacific Islands.

Inos was unanimously confirmed by all nine members of the Senate in a vote on May 1, 2009. More than a dozen community and political leaders had offered testimony in support of Inos' confirmation during the hearing, with no opposition by any of the 20 House members. Inos had noted the difficulties of replacing his predecessor during the confirmation hearing, "It’s a very difficult situation. would have liked to go ahead and fill the position through the normal election process but again the situation presents itself. We have to fill the vacancy. It’s a constitutional mandate. I am very happy that I have an overwhelming support from the people." Governor Fitial swore Inos into office shortly after the conclusion of the Senate's confirmation vote. In taking office through appointment, Inos became the first un-elected Lieutenant Governor of the Northern Mariana Islands in history.

On July 23, 2009, Governor Fitial and Lt. Governor Inos filed to run for re-election with the Election Commission. Fitial won re-election, and Inos was elected to a full term, in a gubernatorial runoff election held on November 23, 2009, defeating Republican Heinz Hofschneider. He was originally scheduled to serve as Lt. Governor for a five-year term, instead of the unusual four years due to changes in the election calendar.

=== Governor ===
Inos became governor on February 20, 2013, following the resignation of Benigno Fitial. Fitial was impeached by the House, for multiple counts, related to the commission of felonies, corruption and to neglect of duty, but resigned before his trial before the Senate. Inos won election to a full four-year term in the 2014 gubernatorial election.

== Death ==
Governor Eloy Inos, died in office at the age of 66 while recovering from open heart surgery in Seattle, Washington, on Monday afternoon, December 28, 2015, Pacific Standard Time (corresponding to 9:45 a.m. Tuesday morning, December 29, Chamorro Standard Time in the Northern Mariana Islands). Inos, who also suffered from diabetes, had been hospitalised in Seattle since November 2015 for treatment.

Inos' lieutenant governor, Ralph Torres, was sworn in as Governor of the Northern Mariana Islands on December 29, 2015.

President Barack Obama called Inos a "tireless advocate". Funeral services for Inos were held on January 12, 2016, which the governor of neighboring Guam, Eddie Calvo, proclaimed as a day of mourning.

Political offices
| Preceded by Timothy Villagomez | Lieutenant Governor of the Northern Mariana Islands; 2009–2013 | Succeeded by Jude Hofschneider |
| Preceded by Benigno Fitial | Governor of the Northern Mariana Islands; 2013–2015 | Succeeded by Ralph Torres |
Party political offices
| Preceded by Heinz Hofschneider | Republican nominee for Governor of the Northern Mariana Islands; 2014 | Succeeded by Ralph Torres |
