= List of elections in 2001 =

The following elections occurred in the year 2001.

== Africa ==
- 2001 Beninese presidential election
- 2001 Cape Verdean parliamentary election
- 2001 Cape Verdean presidential election
- 2001 Chadian presidential election
- 2001 Gabonese legislative election
- 2001 Gambian presidential election
- 2000–2001 Ivorian parliamentary election
- 2001 Malagasy presidential election
- 2001 Mauritanian parliamentary election
- 2001 São Tomé and Príncipe presidential election
- 2001 Senegalese parliamentary election
- 2001 Seychellois presidential election
- 2001 Ugandan parliamentary election
- 2001 Ugandan presidential election
- 2001 Zambian general election

== Asia ==
- 2001 Abkhazian local elections
- 2000–2001 Azerbaijani parliamentary election
- 2001 Bangladeshi general election
- 2001 Bangladeshi presidential election
- 2001 Cypriot legislative election
- 2001 East Timorese parliamentary election
- 2001 Iranian presidential election
- 2001 Israeli prime ministerial election
- 2001 Macanese legislative election
- 2001 Mongolian presidential election
- 2001 Republic of China legislative election
- 2001–02 Republic of China local elections
- 2001 Singaporean general election
- 2001 Sri Lankan parliamentary election
- 2001 Thai general election
- 2001 Yemeni constitutional referendum

=== India ===
- 2001 Tamil Nadu legislative assembly election

=== Japan ===
- 2001 Japanese House of Councillors election
- 2001 Tokyo prefectural election

=== Malaysia ===
- 2001 Sarawak state election

=== Philippines ===
- 2001 Autonomous Region in Muslim Mindanao expansion and inclusion plebiscite
- 2001 Autonomous Region in Muslim Mindanao general election
- 2001 Cebu City local elections
- 2001 Philippine House of Representatives elections
- 2001 Philippine Senate election
- 2001 Philippine general election

== Europe ==
- 2001 Albanian parliamentary election
- 2001 Andorran parliamentary election
- 2001 Basque parliamentary election
- 2001 Belarusian presidential election
- 2001 Bulgarian parliamentary election
- 2001 Bulgarian presidential election
- 2001 Croatian local elections
- 2001 Danish local elections
- 2001 Danish parliamentary election
- 2001 Estonian presidential election
- 2001 French municipal elections
- 2001 Kosovan parliamentary election
- 2001 Liechtenstein general election
- 2001 Manx general election
- 2001 Montenegrin parliamentary election
- 2001 Norwegian Sami parliamentary election
- 2001 Norwegian parliamentary election
- 2001 Polish parliamentary election
- 2001 Portuguese presidential election
- 2001 Portuguese local elections
- 2001 Sammarinese general election
- 2001 Serbian local elections

=== France ===
- 2001 French cantonal elections
- 2001 French municipal elections

=== Germany ===
- 2001 Baden-Württemberg state election
- 2001 Berlin state election
- 2001 Hamburg state election
- 2001 Rhineland-Palatinate state election

=== Italy ===
- Italian Senate election in Lombardy, 2001
- 2001 Italian general election
- Italian general election, 2001 (Sardinia)
- Italian general election, 2001 (Veneto)
- 2001 Molise regional election
- 2001 Sicilian regional election

=== Moldova ===
- 2001 Moldovan parliamentary election
- 2001 Moldovan presidential election
- 2001 Transnistrian presidential election

=== Spain ===
- 2001 Galician parliamentary election

=== United Kingdom ===
- 2001 United Kingdom general election
  - England: 2001 United Kingdom general election in England
  - Scotland: 2001 United Kingdom general election in Scotland
  - Wales:2001 United Kingdom general election in Wales
  - Northern Ireland: 2001 United Kingdom general election in Northern Ireland
  - List of MPs elected in the 2001 United Kingdom general election
- 2001 Banff and Buchan by-election
- 2001 Conservative Party leadership election
- 2001 United Kingdom general election result in Cornwall
- 2001 Ipswich by-election
- 2001 United Kingdom local elections
- 2001 Strathkelvin and Bearsden by-election

==== United Kingdom local ====
- 2001 United Kingdom local elections
- 2001 Northern Ireland local elections

===== English local =====
- 2001 Buckinghamshire County Council election
- 2001 Halton Council election
- 2001 Kent County Council election
- 2001 Lancashire County Council election
- 2001 Shropshire County Council election
- 2001 Southend-on-Sea Council election
- 2001 Suffolk County Council election
- 2001 Thurrock Council election
- 2001 Wiltshire Council election
- 2001 Wokingham Council election

== North America ==
- 2001 Honduran general election
- 2001 Nicaraguan general election

=== Canada ===
- 2001 Alberta general election
- 2001 British Columbia general election
- 2001 Green Party of Ontario leadership election
- 2001 Quebec municipal elections

==== Alberta municipal ====
- 2001 Calgary municipal election
- 2001 Edmonton municipal election

=== Caribbean ===
- 2001 Aruban general election
- 2001 Montserratian general election
- 2001 Saint Lucian general election
- 2001 Tobago House of Assembly election
- 2001 Trinidad and Tobago general election
- 2001 Vincentian general election

=== United States ===
- 2001 United States elections

=== United States House of Representatives ===
- 2001 United States House of Representatives elections
- 2001 Massachusetts's 9th congressional district special election
- 2001 South Carolina's 2nd congressional district special election

==== United States gubernatorial ====
- 2001 New Jersey gubernatorial election
- 2001 United States gubernatorial elections
- 2001 Virginia gubernatorial election

==== United States mayoral ====
- 2001 Albuquerque mayoral election
- 2001 Allentown mayoral election
- 2001 Arlington mayoral election
- 2001 Atlanta mayoral election
- 2001 Boston mayoral election
- 2001 Buffalo mayoral election
- 2001 Charlotte mayoral election
- 2001 Cincinnati mayoral election
- 2001 Cleveland mayoral election
- 2001 Dayton mayoral election
- 2001 Detroit mayoral election
- 2001 Durham mayoral election
- 2001 El Paso mayoral election
- 2001 Fayetteville, North Carolina mayoral election
- 2001 Fort Worth mayoral election
- 2001 Hialeah mayoral election
- 2001 Houston mayoral election
- 2001 Jersey City mayoral election
- Juneau, Alaska, regular election, 2001
- 2001 Lansing mayoral election
- 2001 Manchester, New Hampshire, mayoral election
- 2001 Miami mayoral election
- 2001 Minneapolis municipal election
- 2001 Mobile, Alabama mayoral election
- 2001 New York City mayoral election
- 2001 Omaha mayoral election
- 2001 Pittsburgh mayoral election
- 2001 Raleigh mayoral election
- 2001 Riverside, California mayoral election
- 2001 San Antonio mayoral election
- 2001–02 San Bernardino mayoral election
- 2001 San Diego mayoral special election
- 2001 Seattle mayoral election
- 2001 St. Louis mayoral election
- 2001 Saint Paul mayoral election
- 2001 St. Petersburg, Florida, mayoral election
- 2001 Springfield, Massachusetts mayoral election
- 2001 Winston-Salem mayoral election
- 2001 Worcester, Massachusetts mayoral election

== South America ==
- 2001 Argentine legislative election
- 2001 Chilean parliamentary election
- 2001 Falkland Islands general election
- 2001 Guyanese general election
- 2001 Peruvian general election

== Oceania ==
- 2001 Fijian general election
- 2001 Micronesian general election
- 2001 New Zealand local elections
- 2001 Northern Mariana Islands general election
- 2001 Samoan general election
- 2001 Solomon Islands general election

=== Australia ===
- 2001 Aston by-election
- 2001 Auburn state by-election
- 2001 Australian Capital Territory election
- 2001 Australian federal election
- 2001 Campbelltown state by-election
- 2001 Northern Territory general election
- 2001 Queensland state election
- 2001 Ryan by-election
- 2001 Surfers Paradise state by-election
- 2001 Tamworth state by-election
- 2001 Western Australian state election

=== New Zealand ===
- 2001 Wellington City mayoral election
