= Clacton by-election =

Clacton by-election may refer to two by-elections in England:

- 2014 Clacton by-election, following the resignation of Douglas Carswell to seek re-election
- 2026 Clacton by-election, following the resignation of Nigel Farage to seek re-election
