= William Clouston (politician) =

British politician and town planner (born 1965)

- Clouston at the 2021 SDP National Conference

Leader of the Social Democratic Party
- In office 24 March 2018 – 26 August 2026
- Preceded by: Peter Johnson
- Succeeded by: Ross Baglin (Interim)

Personal details
- Born: William Stuart James Clouston; 7 November 1965 (age 60) Durham, England
- Party: SDP (1984–1988); "Continuing" SDP (1988–1990); Conservative (1999–2003); SDP (since 2016)
- Other political affiliations: Restore Britain (as pressure group; 2025–2026)
- Spouse: Kim
- Children: 3
- Relatives: Brian Clouston (father)
- Education: Scarborough College; University of East London (MSc)
- Profession: Politician; town planner

William Stuart James Clouston (born 7 November 1965) is a British politician and town planner who served as the leader of the Social Democratic Party (SDP) from 2018 to 2026. He is currently chairman of the parish council in Corbridge, Northumberland.

The son of Brian Clouston, a landscape architect, Clouston studied town planning at Birmingham Polytechnic and later the University of East London. He initially worked for the City of Westminster and the London Borough of Enfield before going into property development alongside his father.

Clouston's political career began when he joined the original Social Democratic Party (SDP) in 1984, remaining in the "continuing SDP" until its dissolution in 1990. He later served as a Conservative Party councillor on Tynedale District Council. He joined the current SDP and was elected leader in 2018, during which time he also sat on the advisory board of Restore Britain. He resigned as leader of the SDP in August 2026, following the Clacton by-election earlier that month.

== Early life and career ==
William Stuart James Clouston was born in Durham, England on 7 November 1965, the son of Brian Clouston, a landscape architect. He was educated at Scarborough College in North Yorkshire.

Clouston studied town planning at Birmingham Polytechnic until 1987, later graduating with his master's degree from the University of East London in 1990. He worked as a town planner for the City of Westminster and the London Borough of Enfield between 1988 and 1990, and after that as a consultant at Knight Frank and Rutley until 1992.

In 1993, Clouston left urban planning to work alongside his father (who had resigned his position as chairman of RPS) on urban property development in Northeast England.

== Political career ==
=== Early political career ===
Clouston's father, Brian Clouston, was a member of the Labour Party, but left it in 1981 to become a founding member of the original Social Democratic Party (SDP). Clouston himself joined the SDP three years after its formation, opposing the 1988 merger with the Liberal Party, and subsequently becoming a member of the continuing SDP until its dissolution in 1990.

He later entered the Conservative Party; serving a term as a councillor on Tynedale District Council from 1999–2003, and standing as the party's parliamentary candidate for North West Durham at the 2001 general election.

=== Leader of the Social Democratic Party ===
==== Leadership and political views ====
Before the European Union membership referendum, Clouston was informed by David Owen that a successor party had been set up after the dissolution of the "continuing SDP" in 1990. Clouston became the leader of the current Social Democratic Party (SDP) on 24 March 2018, at which point the party had only 78 members, and was later re-elected by the membership in March 2020, with 89 per cent of the votes cast.

Under his leadership, the party adopted a more eurosceptic and anti-immigration platform. At the 2019 general election, the party fielded 20 candidates receiving a total of 3,295 votes. Clouston stood in Leeds Central, where he polled 281 votes. By January 2021, the party's membership had grown to 2,000, according to SDP supporter Rod Liddle.

At the 2024 general election, the SDP entered an electoral pact with Reform UK, and stood in the largest number of seats since their formation; standing 122 candidates across Great Britain. Clouston himself contested the seat of Hexham, finishing in sixth place with 1,211 votes (2.3%). Since then, he has criticised the governing Labour Party over its handling of the Chagos deal.

Clouston has served as the chairman of the parish council in Corbridge, Northumberland. He was also appointed by Rupert Lowe to the advisory board of Restore Britain, a position he held until Restore was announced as a political party in February 2026.

==== 2026 Clacton by-election ====
On 17 July 2026, Clouston announced his candidacy for the 2026 Clacton by-election. He stated that "it’s wrong that the major parties are boycotting this election because the people of Clacton deserve a better choice than Binface or Nigel Farage". Clouston was the only candidate from an established political party to stand against Farage, although he received little media coverage and was criticised by Reform UK supporters in light of the SDP's former electoral pact with Reform.

Former politician Tom Harris wrote of Clouston's candidacy in The Telegraph:

William Clouston ... considers himself the rightful heir to David Owen and Roy Jenkins and believes, with some justification, that his party’s social-democrat, centre-Left economic policies combined with its rejection of modern woke politics would appeal to a large number of disillusioned voters of both the main parties. It’s a pity therefore that this particular circus is likely to leave him and the SDP in little better position than before. The lesson is that an election is the wrong occasion to raise political issues.

He ultimately placed seventh out of 34 candidates, receiving 256 votes (0.73%) and losing his election deposit.

==== Resignation as leader ====
Clouston resigned as leader of the SDP on 26 August 2026 following the result of the Clacton by-election. In his resignation letter, he said that it had been "very tough" since the general election, citing the party's lack of national visibility amongst other reasons. Under his tenure, the SDP had contested more than 400 elections, securing four victories and more than 208,000 votes.

Molly Kingsley of The Daily Sceptic described the Clacton by-election as a "golden opportunity" for the SDP which was undermined by the media ridiculing the by-election. Kingsley wrote, "it is hard to think of a more valuable or deserving candidate for the Lords".

In the days following his resignation, political figures including Peter Hitchens, Michael Gove, Toby Young and Dominic Cummings expressed their sadness of his departure from public life. Cummings posted on X saying "A rare decent man in SW1 so it's logical he didn't fit in and has decided to leave and the average quality declines yet further".

== Views ==
Clouston has described himself as an "Owenite", and admires Peter Shore and Tony Benn. He has outlined himself as being socially conservative, an advocate of a mixed market economy, and a proponent of protectionist policies through his support of tariffs in the second Trump administration.

== Personal life ==
Clouston and his wife Kim have three sons. He is a supporter of Queens Park Rangers Football Club.

== Electoral history ==
Clouston has stood in four parliamentary elections; once for the Conservatives, and on three occasions as the SDP candidate.

Parliamentary elections contested by William Clouston
Date	Constituency	Party	Votes	%	Position	Result
2001	North West Durham	Conservative	8,193	20.9	2nd	Not elected
2019	Leeds Central	SDP	281	0.6	6th	Not elected
2024	Hexham	SDP	1,211	2.3	6th	Not elected
2026	Clacton	SDP	256	0.7	7th	Not elected
