= List of electoral wards in Lincolnshire =

This is a list of electoral divisions and wards in the ceremonial county of Lincolnshire in the East Midlands. All changes since the re-organisation of local government following the passing of the Local Government Act 1972 are shown. The number of councillors elected for each electoral division or ward is shown in brackets.

== County council ==
=== Lincolnshire ===
Electoral Divisions from 1 April 1974 (first election 12 April 1973) to 7 May 1981:

1. Boston No. 1 (1)
2. Boston No. 2 (1)
3. Boston No. 3 (1)
4. Boston No. 4 (1)
5. Boston Rural No. 1 (1)
6. Boston Rural No. 2 (1)
7. Boston Rural No. 3 (1)
8. Bourne (1)
9. Caistor Rural No. 1 (1)
10. Caistor Rural No. 2 (1)
11. East Elloe No. 1 (1)
12. East Elloe No. 2 (1)
13. East Elloe No. 3 (1)
14. East Kesteven No. 1 (1)
15. East Kesteven No. 2 (1)
16. East Kesteven No. 3 (1)
17. Gainsborough (Market) (1)
18. Gainsborough (North) (1)
19. Gainsborough (South) (1)
20. Gainsborough Rural No. 1 (1)
21. Gainsborough Rural No. 2 (1)
22. Grantham No. 1 (1)
23. Grantham No. 2 (1)
24. Grantham No. 3 (1)
25. Grantham No. 4 (1)
26. Horncastle (1)
27. Horncastle Rural No. 1 (1)
28. Horncastle Rural No. 2 (1)
29. Lincoln (Abbey) (1)
30. Lincoln (Boultham) (1)
31. Lincoln (Bracebridge) (1)
32. Lincoln (Carholme) (1)
33. Lincoln (Castle) (1)
34. Lincoln (Ermine) (2)
35. Lincoln (Hartsholme) (1)
36. Lincoln (Minster) (1)
37. Lincoln (Moorland) (1)
38. Lincoln (Park) (1)
39. Louth (North) (1)
40. Louth (South) (1)
41. Louth Rural No. 1 (Tetney) (1)
42. Louth Rural No. 2 (1)
43. Louth Rural No. 3 (1)
44. Mablethorpe & Sutton (1)
45. North Kesteven No. 1 (1)
46. North Kesteven No. 2 (1)
47. North Kesteven No. 3 (1)
48. North Kesteven No. 4 (1)
49. North Kesteven No. 5 (1)
50. North Kesteven No. 6 (Skellingthorp (1)
51. Skegness (North) (1)
52. Skegness (South) (1)
53. Sleaford (1)
54. South Kesteven No. 1 (1)
55. South Kesteven No. 2 (1)
56. South Kesteven No. 3 (1)
57. Spalding No. 1 (1)
58. Spalding No. 2 (East) (1)
59. Spalding No. 3 (1)
60. Spalding Rural No. 1 (1)
61. Spalding Rural No. 2 (1)
62. Spalding Rural No. 3 (1)
63. Spilsby No. 1 (1)
64. Spilsby No. 2 (1)
65. Spilsby No. 3 (1)
66. Spilsby No. 4 (1)
67. Stamford No. 1 (1)
68. Stamford No. 2 (1)
69. Welton No. 1 (1)
70. Welton No. 2 (1)
71. Welton No. 3 (1)
72. West Kesteven No. 1 (1)
73. West Kesteven No. 2 (1)
74. West Kesteven No. 3 (1)

Electoral Divisions from 7 May 1981 to 7 June 2001:

1. Alford & Spilsby (1)
2. Alford Coast (1)
3. Bardney & Cherry Willingham (1)
4. Bassingham Rural (1)
5. Billinghay & Cranwell (1)
6. Birchwood (1)
7. Bolingbroke Castle (1)
8. Boston Rural South (1)
9. Boston West (1)
10. Boultham (1)
11. Bourne Abbey (1)
12. Bourne Castle (1)
13. Caenby (1)
14. Carholme (1)
15. Cliff (1)
16. Coastal (1)
17. Crowland Rural (1)
18. Devon & St Johns (1)
19. Donington Rural (1)
20. Earlesfield (1)
21. East Elloe (1)
22. Fenside (1)
23. Folkingham Rural (1)
24. Gainsborough East (1)
25. Gainsborough North (1)
26. Gainsborough Rural North (1)
27. Gainsborough Rural South (1)
28. Gainsborough South (1)
29. Grantham North (1)
30. Grantham South (1)
31. Grantham West (1)
32. Grimsthorpe (1)
33. Harrowby (1)
34. Holbeach (1)
35. Holbeach Fen (1)
36. Horncastle & Tetford (1)
37. Hough (1)
38. Hykeham Forum (1)
39. Lincoln Abbey (1)
40. Lincoln Bracebridge (1)
41. Lincoln Castle (1)
42. Lincoln Moorland (1)
43. Lincoln Park (1)
44. Longdales (1)
45. Louth Marsh (1)
46. Louth North (1)
47. Louth Rural North (1)
48. Louth South (1)
49. Louth Wolds (1)
50. Mablethorpe (1)
51. Metheringham (1)
52. Minster (1)
53. Nettleham & Saxilby (1)
54. North East Kesteven (1)
55. North Wolds (1)
56. Rasen Wolds (1)
57. Skegness North (1)
58. Skegness South (1)
59. Skellingthorpe & Hykeham South (1)
60. Skirbeck (1)
61. Sleaford (1)
62. Sleaford Rural North (1)
63. Sleaford Rural South (1)
64. Spalding Abbey (1)
65. Spalding East & Weston (1)
66. Spalding North West (1)
67. Stamford North (1)
68. Stamford South (1)
69. Tattershall Castle (1)
70. The Deepings (1)
71. Tritton (1)
72. Wainfleet & Burgh (1)
73. West Elloe (1)
74. Witham (1)
75. Woodhall Spa & Wragby (1)
76. Wyberton (1)

Electoral Divisions from 7 June 2001 to 4 May 2017:

1. Alford & Sutton (1)
2. Ancholme Cliff (1)
3. Bardney & Cherry Willingham (1) †
4. Bassingham Rural (1)
5. Billinghay & Metheringham (1)
6. Boston Coastal (1)
7. Boston East (1)
8. Boston Fishtoft (1)
9. Boston North West (1)
10. Boston Rural (1)
11. Boston South (1)
12. Boston West (1)
13. Bourne Abbey (1)
14. Bourne Castle (1)
15. Bracebridge Heath & Waddington (1)
16. Branston & Navenby (1)
17. Colsterworth Rural (1)
18. Crowland & Whaplode (1)
19. Deeping St James (1)
20. Donington Rural (1)
21. Folkingham Rural (1)
22. Gainsborough Hill (1)
23. Gainsborough Rural South (1)
24. Gainsborough Trent (1)
25. Grantham Barrowby (1)
26. Grantham East (1)
27. Grantham North (1)
28. Grantham North West (1)
29. Grantham South (1)
30. Heighington & Washingborough (1)
31. Holbeach (1)
32. Holbeach Rural (1)
33. Horncastle & Tetford (1)
34. Hough (1)
35. Hykeham Forum (1)
36. Ingoldmells Rural (1)
37. Lincoln Birchwood (1)
38. Lincoln Boultham (1)
39. Lincoln Bracebridge (1)
40. Lincoln East (1)
41. Lincoln Glebe (1)
42. Lincoln Hartsholme (1)
43. Lincoln Moorland (1)
44. Lincoln North (1)
45. Lincoln Park (1)
46. Lincoln West (1)
47. Louth Marsh (1)
48. Louth North (1)
49. Louth Rural North (1)
50. Louth South (1)
51. Louth Wolds (1)
52. Mablethorpe (1)
53. Market & West Deeping (1)
54. Market Rasen Wolds (1)
55. Nettleham & Saxilby (1)
56. North Wolds (1)
57. Ruskington & Cranwell (1)
58. Scotter Rural (1)
59. Skegness North (1)
60. Skegness South (1)
61. Skellingthorpe & Hykeham South (1)
62. Sleaford (1)
63. Sleaford Rural South (1)
64. Sleaford West & Leasingham (1)
65. Spalding East & Moulton (1)
66. Spalding Elloe (1)
67. Spalding South (1)
68. Spalding West (1)
69. Spilsby Fen (1)
70. Stamford North (1)
71. Stamford Rural (1)
72. Stamford West (1)
73. Sutton Elloe (1)
74. Tattershall Castle (1)
75. Wainfleet & Burgh (1)
76. Welton Rural (1) †
77. Woodhall Spa & Wragby (1)

† minor boundary changes in 2009

Electoral Divisions from 4 May 2017 to present:

1. Alford & Sutton (1)
2. Bardney & Cherry Willingham (1)
3. Bassingham & Welbourn (1)
4. Birchwood (1)
5. Boston Coastal (1)
6. Boston North (1)
7. Boston Rural (1)
8. Boston South (1)
9. Boston West (1)
10. Boultham (1)
11. Bourne North & Morton (1)
12. Bourne South & Thurlby (1)
13. Carholme (1)
14. Colsterworth Rural (1)
15. Crowland (1)
16. Deepings East (1)
17. Deepings West & Rural (1)
18. Donington Rural (1)
19. Eagle & Hykeham West (1)
20. Ermine & Cathedral (1)
21. Folkingham Rural (1)
22. Gainsborough Hill (1)
23. Gainsborough Rural South (1)
24. Gainsborough Trent (1)
25. Grantham Barrowby (1)
26. Grantham East (1)
27. Grantham North (1)
28. Grantham South (1)
29. Grantham West (1)
30. Hartsholme (1)
31. Heckington (1)
32. Holbeach (1)
33. Holbeach Rural (1)
34. Horncastle & the Keals (1)
35. Hough (1)
36. Hykeham Forum (1)
37. Ingoldmells Rural (1)
38. Louth North (1)
39. Louth South (1)
40. Louth Wolds (1)
41. Mablethorpe (1)
42. Market Rasen Wolds (1)
43. Metheringham Rural (1)
44. Nettleham & Saxilby (1)
45. North Wolds (1)
46. Park (1)
47. Potterhanworth & Coleby (1)
48. Ruskington (1)
49. Saltfleet & the Cotes (1)
50. Scotter Rural (1)
51. Skegness North (1)
52. Skegness South (1)
53. Skirbeck (1)
54. Sleaford (1)
55. Sleaford Rural (1)
56. Spalding East (1)
57. Spalding Elloe (1)
58. Spalding South (1)
59. Spalding West (1)
60. St Giles (1)
61. Stamford East (1)
62. Stamford West (1)
63. Swallow Beck & Witham (1)
64. Tattershall Castle (1)
65. The Suttons (1)
66. Waddington & Hykeham East (1)
67. Wainfleet (1)
68. Washingborough (1)
69. Welton Rural (1)
70. Woodhall Spa & Wragby (1)

== Unitary authority councils ==
=== North East Lincolnshire ===
Wards from 1 April 1996 (first election 4 May 1995) to 1 May 2003:

1. Croft Baker (3)
2. Freshney (3)
3. Haverstoe (3)
4. Heneage (3)
5. Humberston (3)
6. Immingham (3)
7. Marsh (3)
8. North East (3)
9. Park (Cleethorpes) (3)
10. Park (Great Grimsby) (3)
11. Scartho (3)
12. South (3)
13. Wold Parishes (3)
14. Yarborough (3)

Wards from 1 May 2003 to present:

1. Croft Baker (3)
2. East Marsh (3)
3. Freshney (3)
4. Haverstoe (3)
5. Heneage (3)
6. Humberston & New Waltham (3)
7. Immingham (3)
8. Park (3)
9. Scartho (3)
10. Sidney Sussex (3)
11. South (3)
12. Waltham (2)
13. West Marsh (2)
14. Wolds (2)
15. Yarborough (3)

=== North Lincolnshire ===
Wards from 1 April 1996 (first election 4 May 1995) to 1 May 2003:

1. Ashby (3)
2. Bottesford (3)
3. Brumby (3)
4. Burton upon Stather & Gunness (2)
5. Crosby & Park (3)
6. Crowle, North Axholme & Keadby with Althorpe (2)
7. Ferry (3)
8. Frodingham & Town (3)
9. Haven (3)
10. Kingsway (3)
11. Lincoln Gardens (3)
12. North West & Winterton (2)
13. Ridge (3)
14. South Axholme (3)
15. Wold (3)

Wards from 1 May 2003 to 4 May 2023:

1. Ashby (3)
2. Axholme Central (2)
3. Axholme North (2)
4. Axholme South (2)
5. Barton (3)
6. Bottesford (3)
7. Brigg & Wolds (3)
8. Broughton & Appleby (2)
9. Brumby (3)
10. Burringham & Gunness (1)
11. Burton upon Stather & Winterton (3)
12. Crosby & Park (3)
13. Ferry (3)
14. Frodingham (2)
15. Kingsway with Lincoln Gardens (3)
16. Ridge (3)
17. Town (2)

Wards from 4 May 2023 to present:

1. Ashby Central (2)
2. Ashby Lakeside (2)
3. Axholme Central (2)
4. Axholme North (2)
5. Axholme South (2)
6. Barton (3)
7. Bottesford (3)
8. Brigg & Wolds (3)
9. Broughton & Scawby (2)
10. Brumby (3)
11. Burringham & Gunness (1)
12. Burton Upon Stather & Winterton (3)
13. Crosby & Park (3)
14. Ferry (3)
15. Frodingham (2)
16. Kingsway & Lincoln Gardens (2)
17. Messingham (1)
18. Ridge (2)
19. Town (2)

== District councils ==
=== Boston ===
Wards from 1 April 1974 (first election 7 June 1973) to 3 May 1979:

Wards from 3 May 1979 to 6 May 1999:

Wards from 6 May 1999 to 7 May 2015:

1. Central (1)
2. Coastal (2)
3. Fenside (2)
4. Fishtoft (3)
5. Five Village (2)
6. Frampton & Holme (1)
7. Kirton (2)
8. North (2)
9. Old Leake & Wrangle (2)
10. Pilgrim (1)
11. Skirbeck (3)
12. South (1)
13. Staniland South (2)
14. Staniland North (1)
15. Swineshead & Holland Fen (2)
16. West (1)
17. Witham (2)
18. Wyberton (2)

Wards from 7 May 2015 to present:

1. Coastal (2)
2. Fenside (2)
3. Fishtoft (3)
4. Five Village (2)
5. Kirton & Frampton (3)
6. Old Leake & Wrangle (2)
7. Skirbeck (3)
8. St Thomas’ (1)
9. Staniland (2)
10. Station (1)
11. Swineshead & Holland Fen (2)
12. Trinity (2)
13. West (1)
14. Witham (2)
15. Wyberton (2)

=== East Lindsey ===
Wards from 1 April 1974 (first election 7 June 1973) to 5 May 1983:

Wards from 5 May 1983 to 6 May 1999:

Wards from 6 May 1999 to 7 May 2015:

1. Alford (2)
2. Binbrook (1)
3. Burgh le Marsh (1)
4. Chapel St Leonards (2)
5. Coningsby & Tattershall (2)
6. Croft (1)
7. Frithville (1)
8. Grimoldby (1)
9. Halton Holegate (1)
10. Holton le Clay (2)
11. Horncastle (3)
12. Hundleby (1)
13. Ingoldmells (1)
14. Legbourne (1)
15. Ludford (1)
16. Mablethorpe Central (1)
17. Mablethorpe East (1)
18. Mablethorpe North (1)
19. Mareham le Fen (1)
20. Marshchapel (1)
21. North Holme (1)
22. North Somercotes (1)
23. North Thoresby (1)
24. Priory (1)
25. Roughton (1)
26. St Clement's (2)
27. St James' (1)
28. St Margaret's (1)
29. St Mary's (1)
30. St Michael's (1)
31. Scarbrough (2)
32. Seacroft (2)
33. Sibsey (1)
34. Skidbrooke with Saltfleet Haven (1)
35. Spilsby (1)
36. Stickney (1)
37. Sutton on Sea North (1)
38. Sutton on Sea South (1)
39. Tetford (1)
40. Tetney (1)
41. Trinity (1)
42. Trusthorpe & Mablethorpe South (1)
43. Wainfleet & Friskney (2)
44. Willoughby with Sloothby (1)
45. Winthorpe (2)
46. Withern with Stain (1)
47. Woodhall Spa (2)
48. Wragby (1)

Wards from 7 May 2015 to present:

1. Alford (2)
2. Binbrook (1)
3. Burgh le Marsh (1)
4. Chapel St Leonards (2)
5. Coningsby & Mareham (3)
6. Croft (1)
7. Friskney (1)
8. Fulstow (1)
9. Grimoldby (1)
10. Hagworthingham (1)
11. Halton Holegate (1)
12. Holton-le-Clay & North Thoresby (2)
13. Horncastle (3)
14. Ingoldmells (1)
15. Legbourne (1)
16. Mablethorpe (3)
17. Marshchapel & Somercotes (2)
18. North Holme (1)
19. Priory & St James’ (2)
20. Roughton (1)
21. Scarbrough & Seacroft (3)
22. Sibsey & Stickney (2)
23. Spilsby (1)
24. St Clement’s (2)
25. St Margaret’s (1)
26. St Mary’s (1)
27. St Michael’s (1)
28. Sutton on Sea (2)
29. Tetford & Donington (1)
30. Tetney (1)
31. Trinity (1)
32. Wainfleet (1)
33. Willoughby with Sloothby (1)
34. Winthorpe (2)
35. Withern & Theddlethorpe (1)
36. Woodhall Spa (2)
37. Wragby (1)

=== Lincoln ===
Wards from 1 April 1974 (first election 7 June 1973) to 3 May 1979:

1. Abbey (3)
2. Boultham (3)
3. Bracebridge (3)
4. Carholme (3)
5. Castle (3)
6. Ermine (3)
7. Hartsholme (3)
8. Minster (3)
9. Moorland (3)
10. Park (3)

Wards from 3 May 1979 to 6 May 1999:

1. Abbey (3)
2. Birchwood (3)
3. Boultham (3)
4. Bracebridge (3)
5. Carholme (3)
6. Castle (3)
7. Longdales (3)
8. Minster (3)
9. Moorland (3)
10. Park (3)
11. Tritton (3)

Wards from 6 May 1999 to 3 May 2007:

1. Abbey (3)
2. Birchwood (3)
3. Boultham (3)
4. Bracebridge (3)
5. Carholme (3)
6. Castle (3)
7. Glebe (3)
8. Hartsholme (3)
9. Minster (3)
10. Moorland (3)
11. Park (3)

Wards from 3 May 2007 to 5 May 2016:

1. Abbey (3)
2. Birchwood (3)
3. Boultham (3)
4. Bracebridge (3)
5. Carholme (3)
6. Castle (3)
7. Glebe (3)
8. Hartsholme (3)
9. Minster (3)
10. Moorland (3)
11. Park (3)

Wards from 5 May 2016 to present:

1. Abbey (3)
2. Birchwood (3)
3. Boultham (3)
4. Carholme (3)
5. Castle (3)
6. Glebe (3)
7. Hartsholme (3)
8. Minster (3)
9. Moorland (3)
10. Park (3)
11. Witham (3)

=== North Kesteven ===
Wards from 1 April 1974 (first election 7 June 1973) to 3 May 1979:

Wards from 3 May 1979 to 6 May 1999:

Wards from 6 May 1999 to 3 May 2007:

1. Ashby de la Launde (1)
2. Bassingham (1)
3. Billinghay (1)
4. Bracebridge Heath & Waddington East (3)
5. Branston & Mere (2)
6. Brant Broughton (1)
7. Cliff Villages (2)
8. Cranwell & Byard’s Leap (1)
9. Eagle & North Scarle (1)
10. Heckington Rural (2)
11. Heighington & Washingborough (3)
12. Kyme (1)
13. Leasingham & Roxholm (1)
14. Martin (1)
15. Metheringham (2)
16. North Hykeham Forum (1)
17. North Hykeham Memorial (1)
18. North Hykeham Mill (1)
19. North Hykeham Moor (1)
20. North Hykeham Witham (1)
21. Osbournby (1)
22. Ruskington (2)
23. Skellingthorpe (2)
24. Sleaford Castle (1)
25. Sleaford Holdingham (1)
26. Sleaford Mareham (1)
27. Sleaford Navigation (1)
28. Sleaford Quarrington (1)
29. Sleaford Westholme (1)
30. Waddington West (1)

Wards from 3 May 2007 to 4 May 2023:

1. Ashby de la Launde & Cranwell (2)
2. Bassingham & Brant Broughton (2)
3. Billinghay, Martin & North Kyme (2)
4. Bracebridge Heath & Waddington East (3)
5. Branston (2)
6. Cliff Villages (2)
7. Eagle, Swinderby & Witham St Hughs (2)
8. Heckington Rural (2)
9. Heighington & Washingborough (3)
10. Kirkby la Thorpe & South Kyme (1)
11. Leasingham & Rauceby (1)
12. Metheringham (2)
13. North Hykeham Forum (1)
14. North Hykeham Memorial (1)
15. North Hykeham Mill (2)
16. North Hykeham Moor (1)
17. North Hykeham Witham (1)
18. Osbournby (1)
19. Ruskington (2)
20. Skellingthorpe (2)
21. Sleaford Castle (1)
22. Sleaford Holdingham (1)
23. Sleaford Navigation (1)
24. Sleaford Quarrington & Mareham (3)
25. Sleaford Westholme (1)
26. Waddington West (1)

Wards from 4 May 2023 to present:

1. Ashby de la Launde, Digby & Scopwick (1)
2. Bassingham Rural (1)
3. Billinghay Rural (2)
4. Bracebridge Heath (2)
5. Branston (2)
6. Cranwell, Leasingham & Wilsford (2)
7. Heckington Rural (2)
8. Heighington & Washingborough (3)
9. Helpringham & Osbournby (1)
10. Hykeham Central (3)
11. Hykeham Fosse (2)
12. Hykeham Memorial (1)
13. Kirkby la Thorpe & South Kyme (1)
14. Metheringham Rural (2)
15. Navenby and Brant Broughton (2)
16. Ruskington (2)
17. Skellingthorpe & Eagle (2)
18. Sleaford Castle (1)
19. Sleaford Holdingham (1)
20. Sleaford Navigation (1)
21. Sleaford Quarrington & Mareham (3)
22. Sleaford Westholme (1)
23. Waddington Rural (3)
24. Witham St Hughs & Swinderby (2)

=== South Holland ===
Wards from 1 April 1974 (first election 7 June 1973) to 3 May 1979:

Wards from 3 May 1979 to 6 May 1999:

Wards from 6 May 1999 to 3 May 2007:

1. Crowland (2)
2. Deeping St Nicholas (1)
3. Donington (2)
4. Fleet (1)
5. Gedney (1)
6. Gosberton Village (1)
7. Holbeach Hurn (1)
8. Holbeach St John's (1)
9. Holbeach Town (3)
10. Long Sutton (3)
11. Pinchbeck (3)
12. Spalding Castle (1)
13. Spalding Monks House (2)
14. Spalding St John's (2)
15. Spalding St Mary's (2)
16. Spalding St Paul's (2)
17. Spalding Wygate (2)
18. Surfleet (1)
19. Sutton Bridge (2)
20. The Saints (1)
21. Weston & Moulton (3)
22. Whaplode (1)

Wards from 3 May 2007 to present:

1. Crowland & Deeping St Nicholas (3)
2. Donington, Quadring & Gosberton (3)
3. Fleet (1)
4. Gedney (1)
5. Holbeach Hurn (1)
6. Holbeach Town (3)
7. Long Sutton (3)
8. Moulton, Weston & Cowbit (3)
9. Pinchbeck & Surfleet (3)
10. Spalding Castle (1)
11. Spalding Monks House (2)
12. Spalding St John’s (2)
13. Spalding St Mary’s (2)
14. Spalding St Paul’s (2)
15. Spalding Wygate (2)
16. Sutton Bridge (2)
17. The Saints (1)
18. Whaplode & Holbeach St John’s (2)

=== South Kesteven ===
Wards from 1 April 1974 (first election 7 June 1973) to 3 May 1979:

Wards from 3 May 1979 to 6 May 1999:

Wards from 6 May 1999 to 7 May 2015:

1. All Saints (2)
2. Aveland (1)
3. Barrowby (1)
4. Belmont (2)
5. Bourne East (3)
6. Bourne West (3)
7. Deeping St James (3)
8. Earlesfield (3)
9. Ermine (1)
10. Forest (1)
11. Glen Eden (1)
12. Grantham St John's (2)
13. Green Hill (2)
14. Greyfriars (2)
15. Harrowby (3)
16. Heath (1)
17. Hillsides (1)
18. Isaac Newton (1)
19. Lincrest (1)
20. Loveden (1)
21. Market & West Deeping (3)
22. Morkery (1)
23. Peascliffe (1)
24. Ringstone (1)
25. Saxonwell (1)
26. St Anne's (2)
27. St George's (2)
28. St Mary's (2)
29. St Wulfram's (2)
30. Stamford St John's (3)
31. Thurlby (1)
32. Toller (1)
33. Truesdale (2)
34. Witham Valley (1)

Wards from 7 May 2015 to present:

1. Aveland (1)
2. Belmont (2)
3. Belvoir (2)
4. Bourne Austerby (3)
5. Bourne East (2)
6. Bourne West (2)
7. Casewick (2)
8. Castle (1)
9. Deeping St James (3)
10. Dole Wood (1)
11. Glen (1)
12. Grantham Arnoldfield (2)
13. Grantham Barrrowby Gate (2)
14. Grantham Earlesfield (2)
15. Grantham Harrowby (2)
16. Grantham St Vincent’s (3)
17. Grantham St Wulfram’s (2)
18. Grantham Springfield (2)
19. Isaac Newton (2)
20. Lincrest (1)
21. Loveden Heath (1)
22. Market & West Deeping (3)
23. Morton (1)
24. Peascliffe & Ridgeway (2)
25. Stamford All Saints (2)
26. Stamford St George’s (2)
27. Stamford St John’s (2)
28. Stamford St Mary’s (2)
29. Toller (1)
30. Viking (2)

=== West Lindsey ===
Wards from 1 April 1974 (first election 7 June 1973) to 3 May 1979:

Wards from 3 May 1979 to 6 May 1999:

Wards from 6 May 1999 to 7 May 2015:

1. Bardney (1)
2. Caistor (2)
3. Cherry Willingham (2)
4. Dunholme (1)
5. Fiskerton (1) †
6. Gainsborough East (3)
7. Gainsborough North (3)
8. Gainsborough South-West (2)
9. Hemswell (1)
10. Kelsey (1)
11. Lea (1)
12. Market Rasen (2)
13. Middle Rasen (1)
14. Nettleham (2)
15. Saxilby (2)
16. Scampton (1)
17. Scotter (2)
18. Stow (1)
19. Sudbrooke (1) †
20. Thonock (1)
21. Torksey (1)
22. Waddingham & Spital (1)
23. Welton (2)
24. Wold View (1)
25. Yarborough (1)

† minor boundary changes in 2008

Wards from 7 May 2015 to present:

1. Bardney (1)
2. Caistor & Yarborough (2)
3. Cherry Willingham (3)
4. Dunholme & Welton (3)
5. Gainsborough East (3)
6. Gainsborough North (3)
7. Gainsborough South-West (2)
8. Hemswell (1)
9. Kelsey Wold (1)
10. Lea (1)
11. Market Rasen (3)
12. Nettleham (2)
13. Saxilby (2)
14. Scampton (1)
15. Scotter & Blyton (3)
16. Stow (1)
17. Sudbrooke (1)
18. Torksey (1)
19. Waddingham & Spital (1)
20. Wold View (1)

== Former county council ==
=== Humberside ===
Electoral Divisions from 1 April 1974 (first election 12 April 1973) to 7 May 1981:

1. Barton upon Humber (1)
2. Beverley (Minster) (1)
3. Beverley (St Marys) (1)
4. Beverley Rural No. 1 (1)
5. Beverley Rural No. 2 (1)
6. Beverley Rural No. 3 (1)
7. Beverley Rural No. 4 (1)
8. Bridlington No. 1 (1)
9. Bridlington No. 2 (1)
10. Bridlington No. 3 (Old Town East) (1)
11. Bridlington No. 4 (Quay North) (1)
12. Bridlington Rural (1)
13. Brigg (1)
14. Cleethorpes No. 1 (Alexandra) (1)
15. Cleethorpes No. 2 (South) (1)
16. Cleethorpes No. 3 (2)
17. Driffield (1)
18. Driffield Rural (1)
19. Glanford Brigg No. 1 (1)
20. Glanford Brigg No. 2 (1)
21. Glanford Brigg No. 3 (1)
22. Glanford Brigg No. 4 (1)
23. Glanford Brigg No. 5 (1)
24. Goole No. 1 (1)
25. Goole No. 2 (1)
26. Goole Rural (1)
27. Grimsby No. 1 (East Marsh) (1)
28. Grismby No. 2 (Littlecoates) (1)
29. Grimsby No. 3 (Springfield) (1)
30. Grimsby No. 4 (Alexandra) (1)
31. Grimsby No. 5 (Weelsby) (1)
32. Grimsby No. 6 (West) (1)
33. Grimsby No. 7 (Clee) (1)
34. Grimsby No. 8 (Central) (1)
35. Grimsby No. 9 (Littlefield) (1)
36. Grimsby No. 10 (Nunsthorpe) (1)
37. Grimsby No. 11 (Wellow) (1)
38. Grimsby Rural No. 1 (Humberstone) (1)
39. Grimsby Rural No. 2 (Laceby) (1)
40. Grimsby Rural No. 3 (Immingham) (1)
41. Haltemprice (Central) (2)
42. Haltemprice (Cottingham) (2)
43. Haltemprice (Hessle) (2)
44. Holderness No. 1 (1)
45. Holderness No. 2 (1)
46. Holderness No. 3 (1)
47. Hornsea (1)
48. Howden No. 1 (1)
49. Howden No. 2 (1)
50. Isle of Axholme No. 1 (West Butterw (1)
51. Isle of Axholme No. 2 (Epworth) (1)
52. Kingston upon Hull No. 1 (Longhill) (3)
53. Kingston upon Hull No. 2 (Greatfiel (3)
54. Kingston upon Hull No. 3 (Holdernes (3)
55. Kingston upon Hull No. 4 (Stoneferr (3)
56. Kingston upon Hull No. 5 (Drypool/M (3)
57. Kingston upon Hull No. 6 (Coltman/S (3)
58. Kingston upon Hull No. 7 (Pickering (3)
59. Kingston upon Hull No. 8 (Boothferr (3)
60. Kingston upon Hull No. 9 (Beverley/ (3)
61. Kingston upon Hull No. 10 (Avenue/N (3)
62. Kingston upon Hull No. 11 (Greenwoo (3)
63. Pocklington No. 1 (1)
64. Pocklington No. 2 (1)
65. Scunthorpe No. 1 (Ashby) (1)
66. Scunthorpe No. 2 (Brumby) (1)
67. Scunthorpe No. 3 (Crosby Town) (1)
68. Scunthorpe No. 4 (Frodingham & Gran (1)
69. Scunthorpe No. 5 (Lincoln Gardens) (1)
70. Scunthorpe No. 6 (Park) (1)
71. Scunthorpe No. 7 (Riddings) (1)
72. Scunthorpe No. 8 (West) (1)
73. Withernsea (1)

Electoral Divisions from 7 May 1981 to 1 April 1996 (county abolished):

1. Alexandra (1)
2. Ashby (1)
3. Avenue (1)
4. Bellfield (1)
5. Beverley Rural (1)
6. Bilton Grange (1)
7. Boothferry West (1)
8. Bottesford (1)
9. Bridlington North (1)
10. Bridlington Old Town (1)
11. Bridlington South (1)
12. Brumby (1)
13. Cottingham North (1)
14. Cottingham South (1)
15. Croft Baker (1)
16. Crosby/Park (1)
17. Dale (1)
18. Derringham (1)
19. Driffield & Rural (1)
20. Drypool (1)
21. East Bransholme (1)
22. East Ella (1)
23. East Park (1)
24. East Wolds & Coastal (1)
25. Endike (1)
26. Ermine (1)
27. Ferry (Glanford) (1)
28. Ferry (Hull) (1)
29. Freshney (1)
30. Frodingham/Town (1)
31. Goole (1)
32. Haven (1)
33. Haverstoe (1)
34. Heneage (1)
35. Hessle (1)
36. Howdenshire (1)
37. Humberston (1)
38. Immingham (1)
39. Inglemire (1)
40. Kingsway (1)
41. Lincoln Gardens (1)
42. Longhill (1)
43. Marfleet (1)
44. Marsh (1)
45. Mid Boothferry (1)
46. Mid Holderness (1)
47. Minster (1)
48. Myton (1)
49. Newington (1)
50. Newland (1)
51. North East (1)
52. North Holderness (1)
53. Orchard Park (1)
54. Park (Cleethorpes) (1)
55. Park (Grimsby) (1)
56. Park (Hull) (1)
57. Pickering (1)
58. Pocklington Provincial (1)
59. Ridge (1)
60. Scartho (1)
61. South (1)
62. South Axholme (1)
63. South Hunsley (1)
64. Southeast Holderness (1)
65. Southwest Holderness (1)
66. St Andrews (1)
67. St Marys (1)
68. Sutton (1)
69. Tranby (1)
70. West Bransholme (1)
71. Wold (1)
72. Wold Parishes (1)
73. Wolds Weighton (1)
74. Wolfreton (1)
75. Yarborough (1)

== Former district councils ==
=== Boothferry ===
See: List of electoral wards in the East Riding of Yorkshire#Boothferry

=== Cleethorpes ===
Wards from 1 April 1974 (first election 7 June 1973) to 3 May 1979:

Wards from 3 May 1979 to 1 April 1996 (district abolished):

=== Glanford ===
Wards from 1 April 1974 (first election 7 June 1973) to 3 May 1979:

Wards from 3 May 1979 to 1 April 1996 (district abolished):

=== Great Grimsby ===
Wards from 1 April 1974 (first election 7 June 1973) to 3 May 1979:

Wards from 3 May 1979 to 1 April 1996 (district abolished):

=== Scunthorpe ===
Wards from 1 April 1974 (first election 7 June 1973) to 3 May 1979:

Wards from 3 May 1979 to 1 April 1996 (district abolished):

== Electoral wards by constituency ==
Wards as they existed on 1 December 2020.

=== Boston and Skegness ===
Boston: Coastal; Fenside; Fishtoft; Five Village; Kirton & Frampton; Old Leake & Wrangle; Skirbeck; St Thomas’; Staniland; Station; Swineshead & Holland Fen; Trinity; West; Witham; Wyberton.

East Lindsey: Burgh le Marsh; Chapel St. Leonards; Croft; Friskney; Ingoldmells; St. Clement’s; Scarbrough & Seacroft; Sibsey & Stickney; Wainfleet; Willoughby with Sloothby; Winthorpe.

=== Brigg and Immingham ===
North East Lincolnshire: Humberston & New Waltham; Immingham; Scartho; Waltham; Wolds.

North Lincolnshire: Barton; Brigg & Wolds; Broughton & Appleby; Ferry.

=== Doncaster East and the Isle of Axholme (part) ===
North Lincolnshire: Axholme Central; Axholme North; Axholme South.

=== Gainsborough ===
West Lindsey: Bardney; Caistor & Yarborough; Cherry Willingham; Dunholme & Welton; Gainsborough East; Gainsborough North; Gainsborough South-West; Hemswell; Kelsey Wold; Lea; Market Rasen; Nettleham; Saxilby; Scampton; Scotter & Blyton; Stow; Sudbrooke; Torksey; Waddingham & Spital; Wold View.

=== Grantham and Bourne ===
North Kesteven: Heckington Rural; Osbournby.

South Kesteven: Aveland; Belmont; Belvoir; Bourne Austerby; Bourne East; Bourne West; Grantham Arnoldfield; Grantham Barrowby Gate; Grantham Earlesfield; Grantham Harrowby; Grantham Springfield; Grantham St. Vincent’s; Grantham St. Wulfram’s; Lincrest; Loveden Heath; Morton; Peascliffe & Ridgeway; Toller; Viking.

=== Great Grimsby and Cleethorpes ===
North East Lincolnshire: Croft Baker; East Marsh; Freshney; Haverstoe; Heneage; Park; Sidney Sussex; South; West Marsh; Yarborough.

=== Lincoln ===
Lincoln: Abbey; Birchwood; Boultham; Carholme; Castle; Glebe; Hartsholme; Minster; Moorland; Park; Witham.

North Kesteven: Bracebridge Heath & Waddington East; Skellingthorpe.

=== Louth and Horncastle ===
East Lindsey: Alford; Binbrook; Coningsby & Mareham; Fulstow; Grimoldby; Hagworthingham; Halton Holegate; Holton-le-Clay & North Thoresby; Horncastle; Legbourne; Mablethorpe; Marshchapel & Somercotes; North Holme; Priory & St. James’; Roughton; St. Margaret’s; St. Mary’s; St. Michael’s; Spilsby; Sutton on Sea; Tetford & Donington; Tetney; Trinity; Withern & Theddlethorpe; Woodhall Spa; Wragby.

=== Rutland and Stamford (part) ===
South Kesteven: Casewick; Castle; Dole Wood; Glen; Isaac Newton; Stamford All Saints; Stamford St. George’s; Stamford St. John’s; Stamford St. Mary’s.

=== Scunthorpe ===
North Lincolnshire: Ashby; Bottesford; Brumby; Burringham & Gunness; Burton upon Stather & Winterton; Crosby & Park; Frodingham; Kingsway with Lincoln Gardens; Ridge; Town.

=== Sleaford and North Hykeham ===
North Kesteven: Ashby de la Launde & Cranwell; Bassingham & Brant Broughton; Billinghay, Martin & North Kyme; Branston; Cliff Villages; Eagle, Swinderby & Witham St. Hughs; Heighington & Washingborough; Kirkby la Thorpe & South Kyme; Leasingham & Rauceby; Metheringham; North Hykeham Forum; North Hykeham Memorial; North Hykeham Mill; North Hykeham Moor; North Hykeham Witham; Ruskington; Sleaford Castle; Sleaford Holdingham; Sleaford Navigation; Sleaford Quarrington & Mareham; Sleaford Westholme; Waddington West.

=== South Holland and The Deepings ===
South Holland: Crowland & Deeping St Nicholas; Donington, Quadring & Gosberton; Fleet; Gedney; Holbeach Hurn; Holbeach Town; Long Sutton; Moulton, Weston & Cowbit; Pinchbeck & Surfleet; Spalding Castle; Spalding Monks House; Spalding St John’s; Spalding St Mary’s; Spalding St Paul’s; Spalding Wygate; Sutton Bridge; The Saints; Whaplode & Holbeach St John’s.

South Kesteven: Deeping St. James; Market & West Deeping.

== See also ==
- List of parliamentary constituencies in Lincolnshire
