= Social Democratic Party (UK, 1990–present) =

Political party in the United Kingdom

- Abbreviation: SDP
- Leader: Eleanor Rofe
- Chairperson: Stephen Balogh
- Founder: Jack Holmes
- Founded: June 1990; 36 years ago
- Split from: Social Democratic Party (1988)
- Headquarters: 108-112 Main Road; Sundridge, Sevenoaks; TN14 6ES
- Youth wing: Young Social Democrats (YSD)
- Membership (January 2021): 2,000
- Ideology: Social democracy; Left conservatism; Cultural conservatism; Communitarianism
- Political position: Economic: Left-wing; Social: Right-wing
- Colours: Red Blue
- Slogan: Family, Industry, Nation
- Local government: 5 / 19,187

Website
- sdp.org.uk

The Social Democratic Party (SDP) is a political party in the United Kingdom founded in 1990. It traces its origin to the Social Democratic Party, established in 1981 by four former Labour MPs who became known as the Gang of Four. The original party merged with the Liberal Party in 1988 to form the Liberal Democrats, but a breakaway faction led by David Owen existed as "the continuing SDP" until its dissolution in June 1990. The current SDP was subsequently formed by members who opposed the dissolution.

Ideologically, the SDP combines social democracy with cultural conservatism, and it advocates for a social market economy. Its policies include public ownership of the railways and utilities, a broader welfare state, greater public investment, reduced inequality and increased defence spending. It also campaigns for a selective education system, tougher criminal justice, restrictions on immigration, and the withdrawal from supranational institutions including the European Court of Human Rights, the Council of Europe, and the 1951 United Nations refugee convention.

The SDP has no representation in the House of Commons. It has held seats in local government, including all three seats in the Middleton Park ward of Leeds. In 2018, Patrick O'Flynn became the party's first and only member of the European Parliament after defecting from UKIP. The following year, journalist Rod Liddle joined the party.

William Clouston served as party leader from 2018 until his resignation in 2026. During his tenure, the SDP initially fielded 20 candidates in the 2019 general election, growing to 122 candidates in the 2024 general election, where it had entered into an electoral pact with Reform UK in some constituencies. The SDP has also contested mayoral elections, including the 2024 London mayoral election with candidate Amy Gallagher, and the 2024 South Yorkshire mayoral election, in which the party's candidate received 20,835 votes (7.6%), a 3.7% increase on the previous result.

== History ==
=== Formation ===
The post-merger Social Democratic Party, often referred to as "the continuing SDP", voted to dissolve itself following a disastrous result in the May 1990 Bootle by-election. However, a number of party members met days after the National Executive had voted for dissolution and, in defiance of the Executive, voted to create a new SDP. The group was led by Jack Holmes, whose defeat by polling fewer votes than the Monster Raving Loony Party candidate in Bootle had led to the party's end.

The much-reduced SDP fought the April 1991 Neath by-election. With Holmes serving as the party's election agent, the SDP candidate received 5.3% of the vote—174 votes behind the fourth-placed Liberal Democrats. It then contested the 1993 Newbury by-election, finishing seventeenth with 33 votes. The party subsequently won a seat in the Aberavon ward on Neath Port Talbot County Borough Council at the 1995 local elections.

=== Subsequent years (1996–2017) ===
The rump of the SDP did not field parliamentary candidates after the 1997 general election, instead concentrating on local branches in Yorkshire and South Wales, where it held eight council seats by January 2006. SDP candidates Jeff Dinham, John Sullivan and Anthony Taylor won all three seats in the Aberavon Ward, Neath Port Talbot in 1999, holding them until Dinham and Sullivan lost their seats in 2012, leaving Taylor as the party's remaining councillor in the area.

Its strongest branch was in Bridlington, where a seat in the Bridlington Central and Old Town ward on East Riding of Yorkshire Council was held by Raymond Allerston from 1987, with his wife Christine being elected to the ward alongside him in 2003. The party also held seats on Bridlington Town Council; with Christine serving as mayor of Bridlington in 2005–06, and Raymond in 2007–2008. Raymond died in September 2014, and the resulting by-election was won by the UK Independence Party (UKIP).

In August 2015, a Green Party councillor on Solihull Borough Council defected to the SDP; however, he lost the seat at the 2016 local elections, receiving only 17 votes. The SDP stood six candidates in the 2017 general election, receiving a total of 469 votes and placing last in every constituency. According to accounts filed with the Electoral Commission, in 2017 the party—before its present financial growth—had a total income of £2,095.

=== Growth, new leadership and new declaration (2018–2026) ===
==== William Clouston and the New Declaration ====
William Clouston, the chairman of the parish council in Corbridge, became leader of the SDP on 24 March 2018. Clouston had been a member of the original SDP and then the "continuing SDP" until 1990, later serving as a Conservative councillor on Tynedale District Council for four years. He later said that, at the time, the party had been on "the brink of extinction" with just 72 members.

In November 2018, the SDP published the 'New Declaration', a political manifesto largely written by Clouston. The party gained its first elected representative above the council level later that month, when Patrick O'Flynn, Member of the European Parliament (MEP) for East of England, announced he would be leaving UKIP to join the SDP, citing the decision of UKIP leader Gerard Batten to appoint Tommy Robinson as an advisor. O'Flynn did not seek re-election as an MEP in the 2019 European Parliament election, on the basis that he believed the UK should have already left the European Union.

In March 2019, political journalist Rod Liddle announced he had joined the party. O'Flynn was the SDP candidate in the June 2019 Peterborough by-election, receiving 135 votes (0.4%), narrowly avoiding a repeat of the 1990 Bootle result by beating the Monster Raving Loony Party candidate, who polled 112 votes. At the 2019 general election, the SDP fielded 20 candidates and received a total of 3,295 votes. Clouston contested Leeds Central, where he placed sixth with 281 votes. By January 2021, SDP membership had reached over 2,000, according to SDP supporter Liddle.

The party won a non-parish council seat for the first time since 2003 when Wayne Dixon was elected to the Middleton Park ward in Leeds at the 2022 local elections. Later that year, the SDP gained second councillor following the defection of a Richard Bright, a Conservative councillor for Derbyshire Dales. The October 2022 SDP National Conference in Manchester was reportedly attended by 200 members, and saw comedian John Cleese, who was introduced by Liddle, deliver a speech to the conference.

At the 2023 local elections, Bright lost his seat to the Conservative candidate in Hulland, however, the SDP gained a second council seat in Middleton Park with 1,985 votes.

==== Elections contested in 2024 ====
Amy Gallagher, a mental health nurse who had taken legal action against the Tavistock and Portman NHS Trust for allegedly "forcing critical race theory onto people", was the party's candidate in the 2024 London mayoral election. Gallagher pledged to abolish ULEZ and "defund woke projects", saying that the money would instead be spent on policing and public transport. She finished in seventh place with 34,449 votes (1.4% of the total).

Constituencies contested by the SDP at the 2024 general election

At the concurrent local elections, the SDP won the third seat in Middleton Park, giving the party all three seats in the ward. In the South Yorkshire mayoral election, its candidate David Bettney polled 20,835 votes (7.6%). A former soldier who served in Bosnia, Iraq and Afghanistan, Bettney campaigned on tackling homelessness, boosting local manufacturing, reopening Doncaster airport and working with disadvantaged teenagers to reduce crime.

The SDP stood in 122 constituencies in the 2024 UK general election. The party campaigned on a manifesto titled 'Homecoming' which pledged to put "family, neighbourhood and nation" front and centre. According to BBC News, "major themes of the launch and the manifesto included reindustrialisation and renationalisation." The SDP had entered into an electoral pact with Reform UK; the two parties stood aside for each other in six constituencies and over a dozen candidates stood under a joint Reform-SDP banner.

The SDP ultimately received a total of 33,811 votes. Its two best performing candidates were Daniel Whetstone in Leeds South and David Bettney in Doncaster North, both retaining their election deposits with 5.9% and 6.9% of the votes, respectively. Liddle contested the seat of Middlesbrough South, narrowly losing his deposit with 4.8% of the vote.

Recent years: 2025–2026

Craig Houston, a Glasgow-based investigative journalist and political commentator, was appointed as the party's leader in Scotland in May 2025. The following month, he was charged with an online communication offence related to comments he made on YouTube about Soryia Siddique, a Muslim Labour councillor on Glasgow City Council. He later stepped down as Scottish leader to contest the 2026 Scottish Parliament election in the Glasgow region as an independent candidate, where he received 1,979 votes.

The SDP fielded Sebastian Moore, a former general election candidate, at the February 2026 Gorton and Denton by-election, who finished with 46 votes (0.1%). The party fielded 48 candidates across 44 wards at the 2026 local elections, gaining no seats but successfully defending Middleton Park, where group leader Wayne Dixon retained his seat—267 votes above Reform UK. The party also fielded one candidate in the 2026 Senedd election, contesting Fflint Wrecsam and placing last with 165 votes (0.2%).

In August 2026, a Reform UK councillor on Wakefield Council, under an internal investigation for personal conduct, joined the party. Another councillor, who had been expelled from Reform UK on Durham County Council, defected at the end of the month.

Clouston was announced as the SDP candidate in the August 2026 Clacton by-election. His candidacy received little media coverage, but he criticised the major parties for boycotting the by-election, and challenged Nigel Farage to a public debate. Clouston came seventh out of 34 candidates with 256 votes—91 votes behind sixth-placed actor Laurence Fox.

Following the by-election, Clouston resigned as leader of the SDP, stating that it had been "very tough" for the party since the 2024 general election. Ross Baglin was subsequently appointed as interim leader of the party.

== Ideology and platform ==
The SDP is described as being socially right-wing, and economically left-wing. The party's ideology has been variously defined as combining social democracy, left-conservatism, and cultural conservatism. Former leader William Clouston has labelled the party as "Owenite Social Democrats", which he states follow communitarianism.

In June 2020, Eric Kaufmann compared the SDP to Blue Labour. Joanna Williams has written that it "rejects both the woke left and the neoliberal right". The party has also been likened to the Workers Party of Britain (WPB), although the SDP said that the WPB's "focus on Middle East politics is niche and narrows its appeal." In June 2025, Sean O'Grady argued that the SDP was one of many parties occupying the "fringe far-right" and was "unrecognisable to those who recall the 1981 Roy Jenkins version".

=== Policies ===
==== Europe ====
The SDP is a Eurosceptic party, and supported Brexit following the 2016 EU referendum. Its Euroscepticism can be traced back to the "continuing SDP" party conference in 1989, which voted in favour of opposing a "United States of Europe". In 2010, Raymond Allerton defended the modern-day SDP's opposition to the EU during an interview with Andrew Neil.

==== Economy and agriculture ====
The SDP advocates a "social market" model that combines private enterprise with state intervention. Its economic policies include reindustrialisation through regional investment, and implementing a "Buy British" procurement policy for public bodies. The party also supports the renationalisation of railways and energy, implementation of a national care service, increased NHS funding, establishing a "national living wage", and restricting marketisation and outsourcing.

The SDP published its agricultural policies, "Farms Fields and Food" in March 2024; its proposals include imposing import tariffs on agricultural products, establishing charter co-operatives and regional marketing boards that would provide for 'small-scale producers', as well as regulating supermarket practices that disadvantage domestic farmers. It also calls for affordable housing for farm workers, and for a ban on the routine use of antibiotics, advertisements of junk food, and of food imports that do not meet British standards.

==== Immigration ====
The SDP calls for an end to "mass migration", and advocates for stricter requirements to obtain permanent residence and British citizenship, proposing that the UK withdraw from both the European Convention on Human Rights (ECHR) and the 1951 UN Refugee Convention. The party also supports the deportation of all illegal migrants.

==== Social issues ====
Socially, the party focuses on the traditional family unit, proposing full sharing of tax allowances between children-raising couples, where the first £25,000 would be free of taxation. To address the housing supply, the platform includes a state-backed building programme to construct 100,000 social homes annually.

The party's policy on transgender rights allows for a person to change their legal sex, but oppose changes of legal gender by self-identification alone. Clouston has stated that while gender dysphoria is a real issue, it "doesn't mean that you can acquire rights and you can trample on sex-based rights."

== Leaders ==
Leader		Took office	Left office	Notes
1	Jack Holmes	June 1990	1991	Party founder
2	John Bates	1991	2008	
3	Peter Johnson	2008	2018	
4	William Clouston	24 March 2018	26 August 2026	
–	Ross Baglin (interim leader)	4 September 2026	17 November 2026	
5	Eleanor Rofe	17 November 2026	present	

== Electoral performance ==
=== Westminster general elections ===
Election	Seats	±	Candidates	Total votes	%	Votes per candidate	Government
1992	0 / 651	Steady	8	6,649	0.1%	831	No seats
1997	0 / 659	Steady	2	1,246	0.0%	623	No seats
2010	0 / 650	Steady	2	1,551	0.0%	776	No seats
2015	0 / 650	Steady	2	125	0.0%	63	No seats
2017	0 / 650	Steady	6	469	0.0%	78	No seats
2019	0 / 650	Steady	20	3,295	0.0%	165	No seats
2024	0 / 650	Steady	122	33,811	0.1%	277	No seats

=== Scottish Parliament elections ===
Year	Regional vote			Constituency vote			Overall seats	Change
2021	405 votes	0.0%	0 / 56	–	–	0 / 73	0 / 129	First time standing

=== London Assembly elections ===
Year	Regional vote			Constituency vote			Overall seats	Change
2021	7,782 votes	0.3%	0 / 11	–	–	0 / 14	0 / 25	First time standing
2024	23,021 votes	0.9%	0 / 11	–	–	0 / 14	0 / 25	Steady

=== Senedd elections ===
Election	Votes	%	Seats	+/–	Government
2026	165	0.01	0 / 96	First time standing	No seats
