= 2001 United States elections =

- ← 1999 2000 2001 2002 2003 → Off-year elections
- Election day: November 6

Congressional special elections
- Seats contested: 7
- Net seat change: Republican +1

Gubernatorial elections
- Seats contested: 3 (2 states, 1 territory)
- Net seat change: Democratic +2
- 2001 gubernatorial election results map

Legend
- Democratic gain Republican hold

Elections were held in the United States on November 6, 2001 (with some exceptions for local elections and other special elections across the country). The 2001 recession was a dominant issue throughout the year as well as the September 11 attacks and subsequent war on terror.

Despite President George W. Bush's strong popularity amongst the American public due to the September attacks, the Democratic Party flipped the governorships of Virginia and New Jersey, a typical showing for an opposition party in off-year elections.

== Federal elections ==
No elections to either the Senate or House were regularly scheduled to occur in 2001.

=== U.S. House of Representatives special elections ===
In 2001, seven special elections to fill vacancies in the House of Representatives were held. Special elections were held for Pennsylvania's 9th congressional district (on May 15), California's 32nd congressional district (June 5), Virginia's 4th congressional district (June 19), Massachusetts's 9th congressional district (October 16), Florida's 1st congressional district (October 16), Arkansas's 3rd congressional district (November 20), and South Carolina's 2nd congressional district (December 18). Only one district, Virginia's 4th congressional district, changed hands with state Senator Randy Forbes' (R) victory to the seat previously held by Norman Sisisky (D). Thus Republicans increased their majority in the House by one seat.

== State elections ==
=== Gubernatorial elections ===
During the 2001 gubernatorial elections, the governorships of two states and one territory were up for election.

Going into the elections, Republicans held the Governorships of twenty-nine states and one territory, Democrats held the governorships of nineteen states, four territories, and the Mayorship of the District of Columbia, and two governorships were held by incumbents of neither party. Democrats gained the governorships of Virginia and New Jersey. However, Republicans retained the governorship of the Northern Mariana Islands. Thus the balance of power between Republicans and Democrats was changed from 29–19 to 27–21.

=== Other statewide elections ===
The offices of Lieutenant Governor (in Virginia as a separate election and the Northern Mariana Islands on the same ticket as the gubernatorial nominee) and state Attorney General in the former were up for election. There were no other statewide elective offices in New Jersey open with the office of governor aside.

=== State legislative elections ===
In 2001, seats in both houses of the New Jersey legislature and the lower house of the Virginia legislature, and both houses of the territorial legislature of the Northern Marina Islands, were up for election.

Republicans maintained control of the Virginia House of Delegates, while Democrats won control of the New Jersey General Assembly, and turned the state Senate from Republican to tied.

== Local elections ==
=== Mayoral elections ===
During 2001, several Major American cities held mayoral elections in that year, including the following:

- Albuquerque: former Mayor Martin Chavez (D) was elected to his previous job to serve a second term.
- Boston: Incumbent Mayor Thomas Menino (D), breaking a campaign pledge he had made in his first election in 1993 to serve only two terms, was re-elected to a third term.
- Buffalo: Incumbent Mayor Anthony Masiello (D) was re-elected.
- Charlotte: Incumbent Mayor Pat McCrory (R) was re-elected to a fourth term.
- Greensboro, North Carolina: Incumbent Mayor Keith Holliday won re-election in the runoff against Roch Smith Jr.
- Houston: Incumbent Mayor Lee P. Brown (D) defeated Councilman Orlando Sanchez to win re-election to a third term.
- Jersey City: Former Public Safety Director of Hudson County Glenn D. Cunningham (D) won an open seat election to succeed outgoing Mayor Bret Schundler (R). Cunningham became Jersey City's first Black mayor.
- Kansas City, Kansas: Incumbent Mayor Carol Marinovich was re-elected.
- Los Angeles: City Attorney James Hahn (D) defeated former State Assembly Speaker Antonio Villaraigosa (D) in the runoff to succeed term-limited Mayor Richard Riordan (R). Villaraigosa would defeat Hahn four years later.
- Monroe: Chairman of the Monroe City Council Jamie Mayo was elected Mayor of Monroe, Louisiana, in 2001. Mayo is the second African-American to be elected Mayor of Monroe.
- New York City: In a tight race to succeed term-limited Mayor Rudy Giuliani (R) that was complicated due to the 9/11 terrorist attacks, Democrat turned Republican billionaire Michael Bloomberg defeated then-Public Advocate Mark Green (D), thus giving the Republican party its third consecutive victory for the Mayorship of New York City despite that city's strong Democratic tendency.
- Pittsburgh: Incumbent Mayor Thomas J. Murphy Jr. (D) was re-elected
- Raleigh: Incumbent Mayor Paul Coble (R) was defeated by former Councilman Charles Meeker (D).
