= Brian Clouston =

British landscape architect (1935–2026)

Brian Clouston OBE
- Born: James Brian Clouston; 3 February 1935; Mossley Hill, Liverpool, England
- Died: 14 May 2026 (aged 91); Morpeth, Northumberland
- Education: Royal Botanic Gardens Edinburgh; Newcastle University
- Occupation: Landscape architect
- Known for: Liverpool International Garden Festival; Founding Brian Clouston and Partners
- Children: 3 (including William Clouston)
- Awards: Officer of the Order of the British Empire (1990); Landscape Institute Legacy Award (2020)

James Brian Clouston OBE (3 February 1935 – 14 May 2026) was a British landscape architect, and founder of Brian Clouston and Partners (BCP), once one of the largest landscape architecture practices in Europe. He is best known for his work in reclaiming the land used by Michael Heseltine for the International Garden Festival in Liverpool.

== Life and career ==
Clouston started as a student gardener. When he was 18, he was called up for two years of compulsory National Service with the Royal Navy. After five years working for the Liverpool Parks Department he entered landscape architecture, originally planning to be a parks manager, during his three years of advanced horticultural training at the Royal Botanic Garden Edinburgh.

He later attended Newcastle University, and went on to serve as president of the Landscape Institute (LI), the UK's professional body for landscape architecture.

Clouston began his professional career with Durham County Council in 1960 before leaving in 1965 to establish his own practice, Brian Clouston and Partners (BCP). During the 1960s and 1970s, the practice undertook large-scale reclamation projects for coal mine pit heaps and derelict land across England. This work reclaimed the site for the Liverpool International Garden Festival—a project Clouston successfully lobbied for as LI president—and the Willow Tree Lane reclamation in Hillingdon, northwest London.

In the 1970s, BCP expanded into the Middle East, managing landscape and reclamation projects in Jeddah and Riyadh, Saudi Arabia. By the late 1970s, Clouston had established a Hong Kong office managed by Alan Tate, which delivered major landscape design projects such as Sha Tin Town Park. Further offices were opened in Singapore, Kuala Lumpur, and Sydney. In the late 1980s, the UK arm of the company merged with RPS plc, with Clouston serving as chairman until 1993. Following this, he focused on property development, serving as a director for several property companies in the north of England. Clouston died at home on 14 May 2026, at the age of 91.

== Books ==
Brian Clouston was the author or editor of the following books:

- Landscape Design with Plants, Van Nostrand Reinhold, 1977
- After the elm... edited by Brian Clouston & Kathy Stansfield, William Heinemann, 1979
- Landscape by Design, William Heinemann, 1980 (with Tony Aldous)
- Trees in Towns: Maintenance and Management, Architectural Press, 1981 (with Kathy Stansfield)
