= 2001 Abkhazian local elections =

- 10 March 2001
- 210 seats across the local assemblies 106 seats needed for a majority
Party	Leader	Vote %	Seats	+/–
Independents / Local Candidates			210	0
This lists parties that won seats. See the complete results below.

On 10 March 2001, Abkhazia held local elections for the 2nd convocations of its local assemblies. In total, 266 candidates contested 210 seats. 40 of the candidates were women.

== Sukhumi City ==
In Sukhumi, 49 candidates were registered for sixteen seats, of whom three withdrew before the elections, leaving 46. Thirteen candidates were nominated by the Communist Party, eight by the People's Party, seven by Aitaira and one by the Mothers for Peace and Social Justice. Twelve candidates won in the first round: Mikhail Chalmaz, Iakub Lakoba, Toto Ajapua, Raul Bebia, Roman Gvindjia, Valeri Bganba, Zinaida Reznikova, Viacheslav Kvitsinia, Valeri Belyanski, Anatoli Enik, Asmat Tarkil and Leonid Lolua. Four candidates were elected in run-off elections in constituencies no. 1, 4, 6 and 16, held on 19 March: Jumber Salakaia, Jon Agrba, Konstantin Pilia and Renat Bendeliani.

== Sukhumi District ==
In Sukhumi District, only one of the elections in the thirteen constituencies was contested by two candidates. All elections were decided in the first round. Two female candidates were elected. Voter turnout was 69.6%.

== Ochamchira District ==
In Ochamchira District, 38 candidates contested 35 seats. Seven of the candidates were women. Around 16:30, an explosion occurred at a polling station in constituency no. 2, were District Head Khrips Jopua was a candidate, causing only material damage. 33 candidates were elected in the first round. Voter turnout was 72.9%. (At 12:00, it had been 35%.)

== Tkvarcheli District ==
In Tkvarcheli District, none of the elections in the seventeen constituencies was contested by more than one candidate. Two of the candidates were women. Official voter turnout was 97%.

== Gulripshi District ==
In Gulripshi District, 24 candidates contested fifteen seats. One of the candidates was a woman. All elections were decided in the first round. Voter turnout was 75%. (At 12:00, it had been 35%.)

== Gagra District ==
In Gagra District, 36 candidates contested 25 seats. A second round was necessary in one constituency. Voter turnout was 52%. (At 12:00, it had been between 25% and 30%.)

== Gudauta District ==
In Gudauta District, 36 candidates contested 29 seats. All elections were decided in the first round. Voter turnout was 55%. (At 12:00, it had been 20%.)

== Gali District ==
In Gali District, none of the elections in the 25 constituencies was contested by more than one candidate. All of the elections were decided in the first round. Voter turnout was 74%. 24 of the elected deputies were Georgian, one Abkhaz.
