= 2001 Tokyo prefectural election =

Local election in Japan

- 26 June 2001

All 127 seats in the Tokyo Metropolitan Assembly 64 seats needed for a majority
- Turnout: 50.08%(▲9.28%)
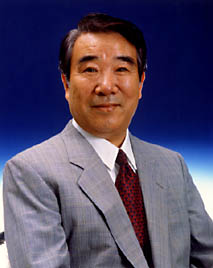

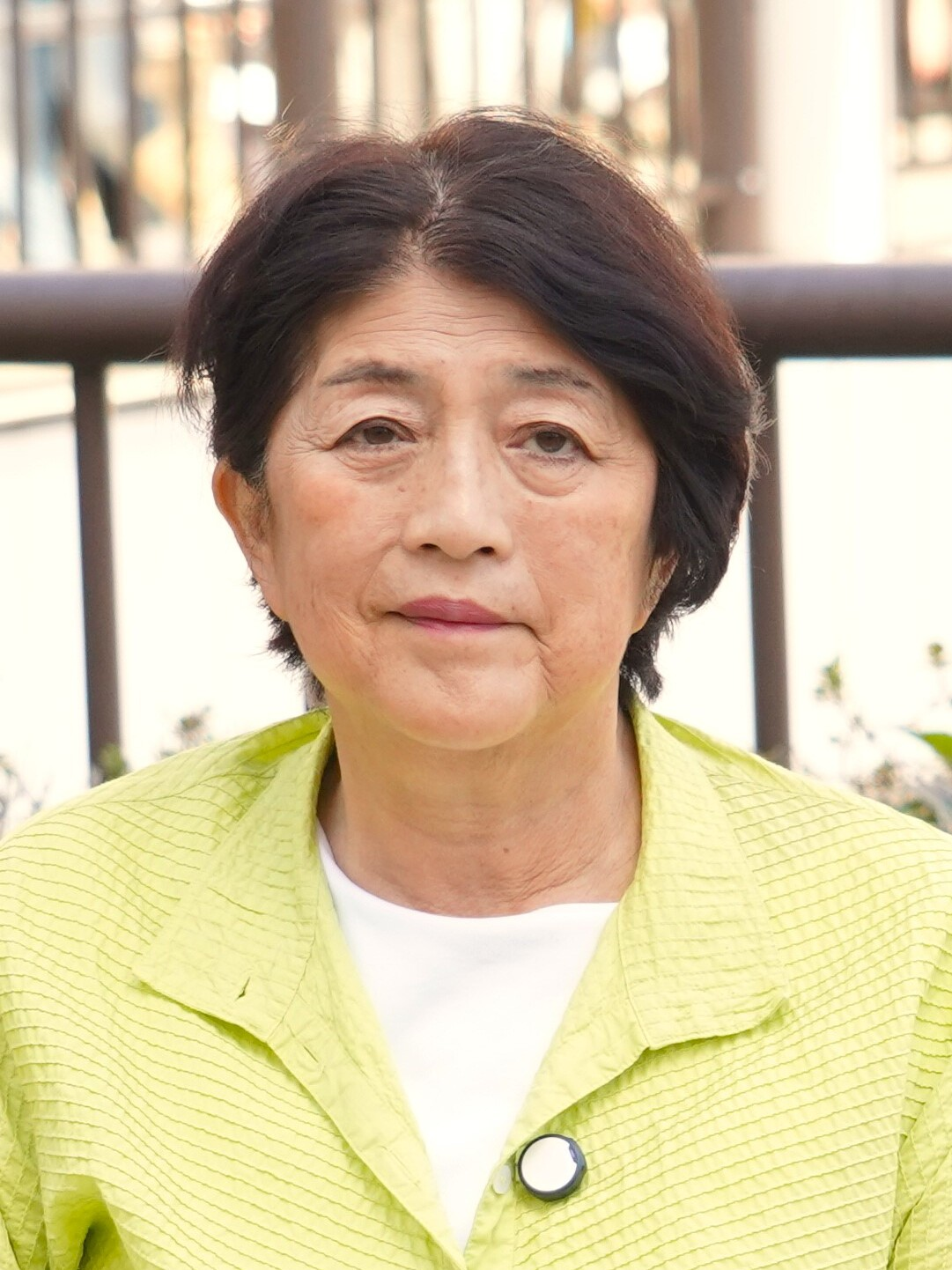
	First party	Second party	Third party
		公明	民主
Leader	Eita Yashiro	Yatsujiro Hashimoto	Tetsundo Iwakuni
Party	LDP	Komeito	Democratic
Last election	54	24	12
Seats before	54	24	12
Seats won	53	22	22
Seat change	▼1	▼1	▲10
Popular vote	1,721,603	722,464	748,085
Percentage	35.96%	15.09%	13.53%
	Fourth party	Fifth party
	共産
Leader	Yoshiharu Wakabayashi	Masako Ōkawara
Party	JCP	Tokyo Seikatsusha Network
Leader's seat	1997
Last election	26	2
Seats before	26	2
Seats won	15	6
Seat change	▼11	▲4
Popular vote	680,200	137,489
Percentage	15.63%	2.87%
Assembly President before election
Morio Shibuya
LDP
Elected Assembly President
Toshiya Mita
LDP

Prefectural elections were held in Tokyo for the city's Metropolitan Assembly on June 24, 2001. The Liberal Democratic Party (LDP) and New Komeito Party secured their positions as ruling parties. Japanese Communist Party (JCP) lost almost half its seats while Democratic Party of Japan (DPJ) saw an increase by ten seats.

== Results ==
Summary of the June 24, 2001 Tokyo Metropolitan Assembly election results
Parties	Candidates	Votes	%	Seats
Liberal Democratic Party of Japan (自由民主党, Jiyū Minshutō)	55	1,721,603	35.96	53
New Komeito party (公明党, Kōmeitō)	23	722,464	15.09	23
Democratic Party of Japan (民主党, Minshutō)	33	647,572	13.53	22
Japanese Communist Party (日本共産党, Nihon Kyōsan-tō)	44	748,085	15.63	15
Tokyo Seikatsusha Network (東京・生活者ネットワーク)	6	137,489	2.87	6
Social Democratic Party (社民党 Shamin-tō)	6	68,055	1.42	0
Liberal Party (自由党, Jiyū-tō)	13	132,719	2.77	0
Others	3	49,224	1.03	1
Independents	61	560,245	11.7	7
Total (turnout 50.08%)	244	4,862,229	100.00	127
Source:Tokyo electoral commission Archived 2003-04-23 at the Wayback Machine, Archived 2003-04-23 at the Wayback Machine
