= 2026 Clacton by-election =

UK parliamentary by-election

- 13 August 2026

Clacton constituency
- Registered: 79,785
- Turnout: 44.4% (▼14.3 pp)
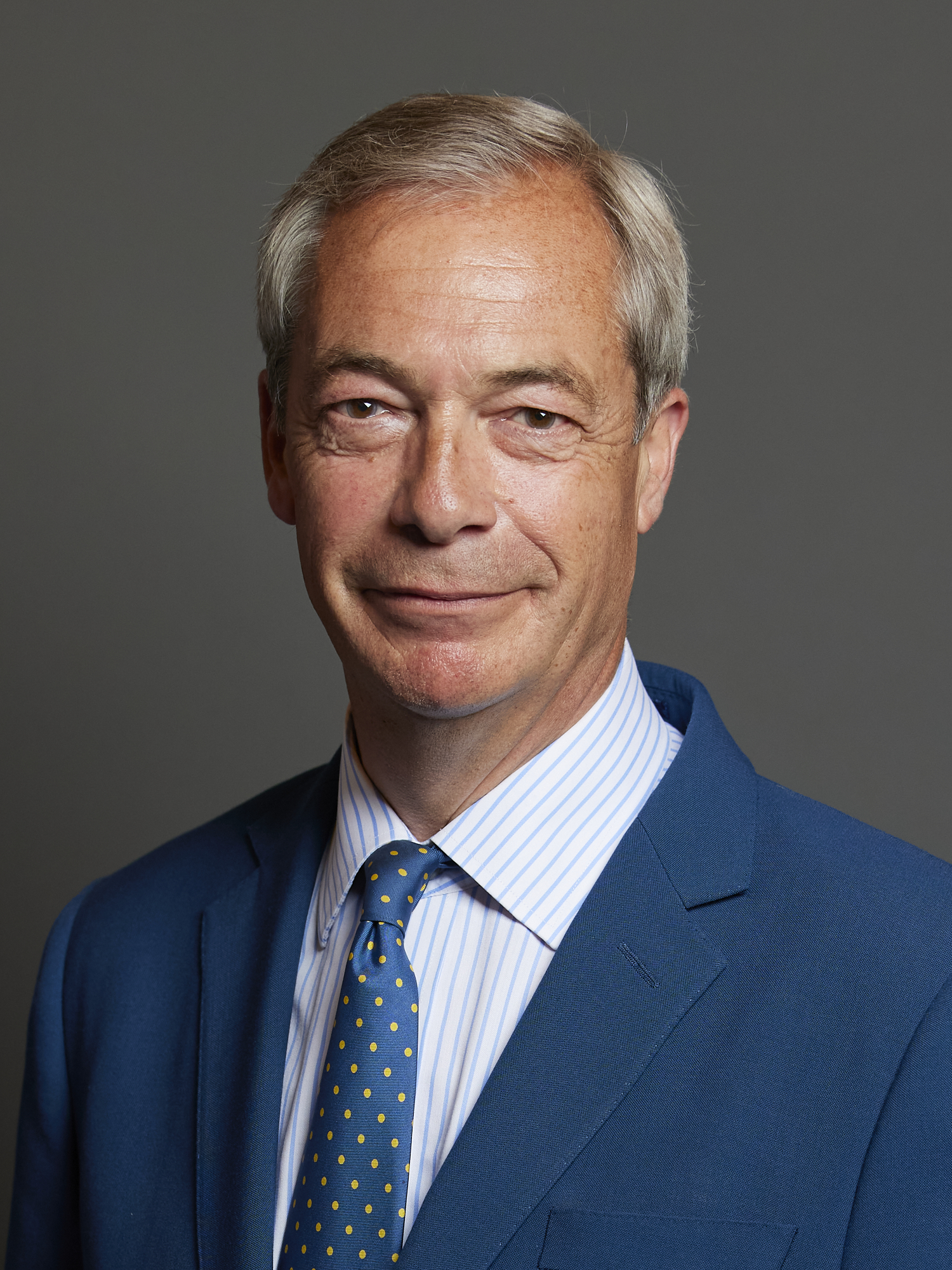

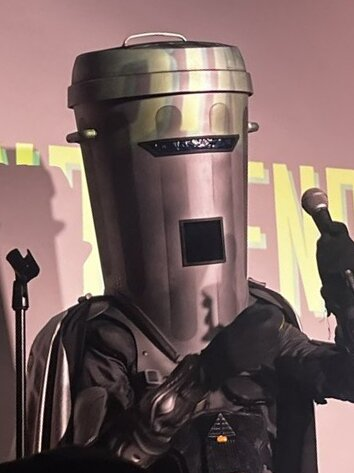
| Candidate | Nigel Farage | Count Binface |
| Party | Reform | Binface |
| Popular vote | 22,239 | 9,455 |
| Percentage | 63.3% | 26.9% |
| Swing | ▲17.1 pp | New |
MP before election
Nigel Farage
Reform
Elected MP
Nigel Farage
Reform

A by-election for the United Kingdom parliamentary constituency of Clacton was held on 13 August 2026, following the resignation of Nigel Farage, its member of Parliament. Farage, who is the leader of Reform UK, had represented Clacton since the 2024 general election. He announced on 7 July 2026 that he would vacate his seat to trigger a by-election and re-contest the constituency; his resignation was accepted the next day. The announcement came amid parliamentary scrutiny of Farage's personal finances, and allegations concerning undeclared gifts and support.

The Labour Party, the Conservative Party, the Liberal Democrats, the Green Party and Restore Britain did not contest the by-election, leaving Count Binface, a novelty candidate, as the main challenger to Farage. Thirty-two other candidates were nominated, with the total of 34 breaking the record, previously set in a 2008 Haltemprice and Howden by-election, for the most candidates standing in any UK parliamentary election. The list included 18 independent candidates.

Farage was returned with 22,239 votes (63.3% of the 44.4% turnout), followed by Binface with 9,455 (26.9%). The other 32 candidates polled between 7 and 492 (1.4%) votes, losing their deposits.

Binface's 26.9% share of the vote was thought to be the highest ever recorded by a novelty candidate in a UK parliamentary election. The result also represented a record vote total for Binface, who had previously contested several elections.

== Background ==
=== Clacton ===
Clacton is a coastal constituency in Essex, in the East of England. It is centred on Clacton-on-Sea and also includes other towns and villages in the Tendring area, including Frinton-on-Sea, Walton-on-the-Naze and Jaywick. According to 2021 census data, its residents are 96% ethnically White, and 44% of its residents belong to social grades A, B and C1. The average gross household income is £33,147, below the average of £42,397 for Great Britain as a whole, and the home-ownership rate is 73%, against 64% nationally. In the 2016 membership referendum, an estimated 73% of those who voted chose to leave the European Union. The constituency is also known for being a target seat for right-wing populist parties; the 2014 Clacton by-election was contested and won by Douglas Carswell, who had resigned as the member of Parliament (MP) for the constituency after defecting from the Conservative Party to the UK Independence Party (UKIP; at the time also led by Nigel Farage). The result made Carswell UKIP's first elected MP.

=== Investigation into Farage ===
Farage's declaration that he was standing down followed reports of parliamentary investigations into his financial interests, his relationships with wealthy people, and other matters. Specifically, the investigations involved: a payment of £5 million from the Thailand-based British businessman and cryptocurrency investor Christopher Harborne; possible gifts in kind from George Cottrell, a British financier and political activist who was convicted of felony wire fraud in the United States in 2017; allegations of lobbying the Bank of England regarding cryptocurrency; declaration of several properties. Farage said that the legal advice he received was that he did not need to declare the £5m gift from Harborne.

Farage's resignation interrupted the investigation process, though it would resume if he returned to Parliament. Were Farage to be suspended from Parliament for more than 10 sitting days or 14 calendar days, it would trigger a recall petition, which if successful would result in a further by-election. In addition to the parliamentary investigation, on the day of Farage's resignation as an MP it was reported that the £5 million payment from Harborne had also been reported to the United Kingdom's National Crime Agency by bankers under the anti-money laundering suspicious activity report scheme. Other donations to Reform UK and other party leaders have also been flagged under the scheme.

=== Vacation of the seat ===
On 7 July 2026 Farage announced that he would vacate his seat as MP for Clacton and stand again in the resulting by-election. He gave the investigations into him and his treatment by the press as reasons. Farage denied wrongdoing and said that he wanted voters in Clacton, rather than the press or parliamentary authorities, to decide whether he should continue as their MP. On 8 July, Rachel Reeves, the chancellor of the exchequer, formalised his resignation by appointing him to the office of profit post of Steward and Bailiff of the Manor of Northstead to vacate his seat (as outright resignation from the Commons is not possible). While objecting to his motives for resigning, she said "if he wants to spend the summer arguing with a bin, I won't stop him".

The writ to trigger the by-election was moved on 9 July, and the date of 13 August was selected. In the 21st century, there have been four instances where an incumbent MP has resigned and immediately stood in the ensuing by-election: David Davis at the 2008 Haltemprice and Howden by-election, Douglas Carswell at the 2014 Clacton by-election, Mark Reckless at the 2014 Rochester and Strood by-election and Zac Goldsmith at the 2016 Richmond Park by-election. All but Goldsmith retained their seats.

== Candidates ==
The Statement of Persons Nominated was published after nominations closed on 17 July 2026. Thirty-four candidates stood, breaking the record of 26 set at the 2008 Haltemprice and Howden by-election. The large number of candidates resulted in the creation of the UK's largest ballot papers, measuring 90 cm (3 ft) in length, which cost four times more to print than regular ballots. Ian Davidson, chief executive of Tendring District Council, told the BBC that the ballots, being longer than some of the tables used to count them on, meant that tables would have to be doubled for sorting ballots into batches before they could be verified and counted.

=== Declined to stand ===
Shortly after Farage's announcement, the Labour Party, the Conservative Party, the Green Party, the Liberal Democrats and Restore Britain all stated they would not contest the by-election. A Labour spokesperson called the situation "pathetic", while Restore Britain leader Rupert Lowe said his party would not participate in "a Reform-sponsored media circus". Green Party deputy leader Mothin Ali initially said (on 7 July) that the Greens stand in "every election", but the party confirmed later that day that it would not nominate a candidate, describing the by-election as being designed to "serve Nigel Farage's personal political ambitions".

The Conservatives were reported to be targeting the seat in the next UK general election, but the party's leader, Kemi Badenoch, said that they would not stand in "Farage's fake by-election". On 7 August, she wrote an open letter saying her party would participate in any second by-election. The film journalist David Hughes, who stood as Lord Buckethead for the Official Monster Raving Loony Party at the 2019 general election in Uxbridge and South Ruislip, said that he was finished with Buckethead and endorsed Count Binface instead.

== Campaign ==
=== Reform UK ===
Farage denied wrongdoing and described the contest as a "people versus the establishment" by-election. Reform offered to pay for the costs of the by-election, estimated at around £200,000, but the Ministry of Housing, Communities and Local Government stated that this would be illegal since elections are required to solely use public funds. In an interview with the Daily Mail, Farage denied accusations that the by-election was a "farce", calling it a "real election with real people". He expressed surprise at the other parties' decision not to field candidates, which he described as "showing contempt" towards the electorate.

The Guardian reported on 9 July that Reform UK called on party activists to shift their focus from the Greater Manchester mayoral by-election on 30 July to support Farage in Clacton. Reform UK responded to the report by stating: "Our campaign plans for the Greater Manchester mayor by-election remain unchanged." On 23 July, while Farage was campaigning in Clacton, a woman heckled Farage, shouting "wanker" as she drove past him, but while doing so crashed into the car in front of her while it was waiting at traffic lights. Farage later said: "That's what you might call instant karma!" in reference to the incident.

=== Count Binface Party ===
After the major parties declined to contest the election, the serial novelty candidate Count Binface became the main contender to Farage in early media coverage, with The Independent reporting that Binface had become the focus of an anti-Farage tactical voting campaign. Binface described himself as a "unity candidate". In an interview with BBC Radio 4, Binface conceded that he would "probably not" win the election, but said that his job was "to celebrate and defend the wonders of British democracy". He said his main appeal would be that he is not Farage.

Many mainstream politicians reacted to Binface's candidature with a mixture of amusement and approbation. Badenoch, the Leader of the Opposition, said that if the by-election was a "people versus the establishment" that "Farage might be looking like the establishment and Count Binface maybe the people". Keir Starmer, the prime minister, said he could not endorse Binface due to Labour Party rules. Andy Burnham, who became prime minister the following month, posted a picture of himself shaking hands with Binface at a by-election. He later said that Binface was "carrying the hopes of the nation".

Binface received a surge of support from activists after announcing his candidacy, raising more than £15,000 in donations in a day. He said he hoped to appeal to voters from all sides of the political spectrum and said he could even court the immigrant vote, given he was "the ultimate alien". The green-energy industrialist Dale Vince, who has previously donated to Labour and the Green Party, offered to fund Binface's campaign. Mr. C, former frontman of the psychedelic band the Shamen, re-recorded the band's 1992 number one single "Ebeneezer Goode" with lyrics about Binface, and filmed a music video. Media personality Carol Vorderman urged Clacton's voters to support Binface. Binface's campaign gained global media attention, and has inspired a flood of internet memes satirising the contest. At Starmer's final session of Prime Minister's Questions, on 15 July 2026, Badenoch, the leader of the opposition, asked Starmer whether he agreed that the country deserved a televised debate between Farage and Binface. Starmer replied that his advice to everyone was to "put [their] vote in the Bin", which was interpreted by The Daily Telegraph as an endorsement of Binface. It was noted that under Parliamentary rules, he would not have been permitted to wear his costume in the chamber.

In his manifesto published on 27 July, Binface announced 20 campaign pledges, including "MPs who resign mid-parliament to be barred from the resulting by-election", and "I will not accept £5 million gifts from crypto billionaires (on Earth)".

On the weekend before the vote, Binface supporters staged various campaign stunts. On the day before the vote, the Austin Powers vintage Union Jack Jaguar toured the town, and campaign slogans and manifesto pledges were projected onto one of the Martello towers on the beachfront, which were said to resemble bins.

=== Official Monster Raving Loony Party ===
The satirical Official Monster Raving Loony Party fielded three candidates – party leader Howling Laud Hope, Nick the Incredible Flying Brick, and Baron Von Thunderclap. Binface ruled out a "Loony-Bin pact" during an interview on the BBC's Newsnight, saying that the Loonies and Farage were competing for the novelty vote. In response to Binface, one of the policies in their "manicfesto" was to "ban intergalatic [sic] interference in UK elections".

=== Other candidates ===
- William Clouston, the leader of the Social Democratic Party, announced on 17 July that he would stand.
- Laurence Fox, the leader of the Reclaim Party, announced on 7 July he would be standing. Fox stated that he would "provide a voice on the 'right'" while also criticising the major parties for not standing a candidate against Farage, saying: "This is meant to be a democracy." Fox has also said that Binface "literally is the establishment".
- Abi Hookway, independent, whose policies include establishing a local dentist in Clacton and helping local businesses. Hookway later pulled out of the election, alleging having received multiple threats.
- James Ransley stood for the self-led Consensus Party.
- Kai Stephens was selected for the far-right British Democratic Party to contest the seat. He described his opponents as "subpar", including calling Binface a "failed leftist comedian" and Farage a "traitor who works in the interests of Zionism, capitalism, [and] globalism" and said he is "the only option on the paper that is serious, patriotic, and most importantly, nationalist".
- John Stevens, a former Conservative MEP and current deputy leader of Rejoin EU, a reaccessionist party, also stood. Stevens had previously stood for the Buckinghamshire Campaign for Democracy in Buckingham at the 2010 general election, finishing second behind Speaker of the House of Commons John Bercow and ahead of Farage. He finished third.

== Public reaction ==
In response to Farage's resignation, the Daily Mirror's headline described the move as "desperate", but the Daily Express repeated Farage's narrative of "[letting] the people be the judges". The Daily Telegraph said that his gamble had turned to farce once the other major political parties decided to boycott the contest. The Times criticised Farage for trying to distract from legitimate questions about his financial dealings, and the i Paper described the tactics as "straight out of the Donald Trump playbook". Politico reported on two local focus groups of voters who had supported Farage at the general election, who overwhelmingly agreed that the by-election was unnecessary and a farce. One group, consisting of nine voters, was prepared to stick with Farage (with one exception), but complained that the town had become a laughing stock with "an influx of idiots". Another group, consisting of disaffected Tory voters, had all soured on Farage and tended towards Binface.

A nationwide poll of 1,000 British people by Ipsos in July 2026 found that 33% wanted Binface to win, as opposed to 21% for Farage. Another poll by Survation found that 52% of people polled believed Farage triggered the by-election to detract attention from the financial investigations into him. The Ipsos poll found 74% of respondents wanted the standards committee investigation to continue. Furthermore, 54% of those polled said he should not have resigned his seat to force the by-election, seeing it as a tactic to avoid scrutiny and accountability.

== Analysis ==
Stephen Pollard, writing for The Spectator on 9 July, called the election a straight "two-way fight" between Farage and Binface, and speculated that the latter could win. The political scientist Sir John Curtice, writing for The Telegraph, also on 9 July, said that Farage should "win comfortably" in Clacton, citing the strong majority in Clacton who voted to leave in the Brexit referendum. Tom Harris proclaimed the election "a farce and a complete waste of time and money", adding that "it is a worrying indication that the man whom many still consider likely to become our next prime minister has an empty vacuum where a sense of judgment ought to be." John Rentoul of The Independent said he assumed that Farage would win by an overwhelming margin on a low turnout, but that the presence of Binface and other novelty candidates trivialised important questions about security following the killing of the Reform UK spokeswoman Ann Widdecombe.

The Daily Mail published a commentary with the heading: "Farage is learning that when voters are shouting at you, it's bad. When they're laughing at you, it's over." Conversely, Jawad Iqbal, writing in The Spectator said of Farage's decision to trigger the by-election: "It is a clever move – perhaps the only move he could make – which gives him a chance to retake control of the political narrative." The academic Mark McGeoghegan said that he did not think Binface had any reasonable chance of winning, given that Clacton is the constituency in the UK most inclined to support Reform.

According to Paul Whiteley, writing in The Conversation, Farage's situation was self-inflicted on multiple fronts, starting with a lack of financial transparency and breach of disclosure rules that has visibly damaged his standing, as the Reform electorate is a largely working-class, northern coalition likely to disapprove of a leader accepting large sums from an offshore billionaire. The deeper strategic error was assuming the contest would vindicate him and validate his outsider positioning; caught out by the mainstream parties' boycott, Farage instead faced what the Telegraph dubbed "joke parties" — Count Binface and the Monster Raving Loony Party. The by-election therefore risked undercutting the appearance of unstoppable momentum he wanted ahead of a general election. Finally, asked which parties were "on the side of the people", Reform (28%) trailed the Liberal Democrats (33%) and Greens (39%), with 36% seeing Reform as establishment-aligned, undermining the anti-establishment narrative that was his core strategic asset.

In a video report, The Financial Express said that Count Binface had little to lose: "If he performs well, it reinforces his reputation as Britain's leading satirical candidate. If he performs poorly, that's exactly what most people expect". For Farage, conversely, the stakes are quite different: "This was his election. He called it, he framed it... A convincing victory would allow Farage to argue that his political message still resonates with voters. But if turnout disappoints, or if protest candidates perform unexpectedly well, critics are likely to argue that his anti-establishment narrative isn't quite as powerful as he claims. The symbolism matters almost as much as the result itself." Lord Hayward, who specialises in polling, appeared to concur: "It could be a triple embarrassment... because Farage has to show that a large number of Clacton voters still support him." With the absence of the major parties, he believed that the actual performance of candidates like Count Binface would be an important indicator.

== Opinion polling ==
On 2 August, a constituency poll by Survation indicated that Farage was leading the polls with about 73%, with Binface polling at about 20%. The same poll found that in a two-way race between Farage and Binface, Farage would win 69% of the votes while Binface would get 31%.

| Date(s) conducted | Pollster | Sample size | Reform | Binface | Reclaim | Other | Lead |
|---|---|---|---|---|---|---|---|
| 13 Aug 2026 | 2026 by-election | 35,111 | 63.3% | 26.9% | 1.0% | 8.8% | 36.4 |
| 16–24 Jul 2026 | Survation | 502 | 73% | 20% | 2% | 5% | 53 |
| 4 Jul 2024 | 2024 general election | 45,958 | 46.2% | — | — | 53.8% (Note: Labour, the Liberal Democrats, the Conservatives and the Greens stood in 2024, but did not stand in the by-election.) | 18.3 (Note: Over Conservative candidate Giles Watling.) |

== Result ==
Polls were open between 7:00 and 22:00 BST on 13 August 2026, and the declaration took place shortly after 06:00 BST on 14 August. Farage won with 22,239 votes (63.3% of the 44.4% turnout), while Binface placed second with 9,455 votes (26.9%), thought to be the highest share obtained by a novelty candidate in UK political history.

The other 32 candidates received a combined total of 3,417 votes (9.73%). Individually, they received between 7 and 492 (1.4%) votes. Twenty candidates received 60 votes (0.17%) or fewer, including all three candidates from the Official Monster Raving Loony Party. All 32 lost their deposits.

In the hours before the results were announced, addressing a group of Reform UK supporters, Farage said he would not attend the result declaration as he had been told that there was an "organised campaign to disrupt and degrade the result" and that he wanted to avoid being "demeaned and humiliated by nobodies". A Reform UK spokesperson also said that "Essex Police advised Nigel not to attend the count tonight due to a credible threat against him". Essex Police said there was "a proportionate and robust policing operation" around the count, and denied they had advised any candidate against attending. Farage was the first parliamentary by-election winner not to attend their own count and declaration since incarcerated IRA member Bobby Sands's victory at the April 1981 Fermanagh and South Tyrone by-election. At the results announcement, in what The Straits Times called a "victory speech", Count Binface said "I am the winning candidate – of the candidates who bothered to turn up".

2026 Clacton by-election
| Party | Candidate | Votes | % | ±% |
|---|---|---|---|---|
| Reform | Nigel Farage | 22,239 | 63.34 | +17.16 |
| Binface | Count Binface | 9,455 | 26.93 | N/A |
| Rejoin EU | John Stevens | 492 | 1.40 | N/A |
| Independent | Tony Francis | 432 | 1.23 | N/A |
| Independent | Pamela Walford | 371 | 1.06 | N/A |
| Reclaim | Laurence Fox | 347 | 0.99 | N/A |
| SDP | William Clouston | 256 | 0.73 | N/A |
| Independent | Nick Pelas | 202 | 0.58 | N/A |
| Consensus | James Ransley | 192 | 0.55 | N/A |
| Independent | Stephen Ingram | 159 | 0.45 | N/A |
| British Democratic | Kai Stephens | 132 | 0.38 | N/A |
| Independent | Attieh Fard | 126 | 0.36 | N/A |
| Independent | Derrick Morris | 100 | 0.28 | N/A |
| Independent | Martyn Obrien | 65 | 0.19 | N/A |
| Freedom Alliance | Martin Davies | 60 | 0.17 | N/A |
| Independent | Robin Green | 59 | 0.17 | N/A |
| Independent | Rees Cowne | 50 | 0.14 | N/A |
| Forward | Adham Alkhatip | 49 | 0.14 | N/A |
| Independent | Amy Morris | 46 | 0.13 | N/A |
| Independent | Andy Erlam | 44 | 0.13 | N/A |
| Independent | Joseph 77 | 42 | 0.12 | N/A |
| Monster Raving Loony | Nick The Incredible Flying Brick | 28 | 0.08 | N/A |
| UK Voice | Ketankumar Pipaliya | 21 | 0.06 | N/A |
| Independent | Michael O'Keeffe | 19 | 0.05 | N/A |
| Monster Raving Loony | Howling Laud Hope | 18 | 0.05 | N/A |
| Independent | Tony Cane | 17 | 0.05 | N/A |
| No description | Daniel Pocock | 16 | 0.05 | N/A |
| Monster Raving Loony | Baron Von Thunderclap | 15 | 0.04 | N/A |
| Independent | Abi Hookway | 14 | 0.04 | N/A |
| Independent | Marc Wilkinson | 11 | 0.03 | N/A |
| Everyone is God | Marcus White | 10 | 0.03 | N/A |
| Independent | Gerry Smith | 9 | 0.03 | N/A |
| Independent | Woke Trump Carrzee | 8 | 0.02 | N/A |
| Independent | Glenn Cummings | 7 | 0.02 | N/A |
| Majority | | 12,784 | 36.41 | +18.13 |
| Turnout | | 35,111 | 44.01 | −14.73 |
| Rejected ballots | | 280 | 0.79 | +0.55 |
| Registered electors | | 79,785 | | |
| Reform hold | | Swing | N/A | |

== Aftermath ==
While Farage did not attend the election count, he attended a gathering of Reform UK supporters on the same night at Great Oakley airfield on the outskirts of Clacton, referred to in the media as "Farage Fest". The event included a live band, bars, fire pits, marquees, and a ferris wheel, and was covered only by GB News, while other media including the Guardian were prohibited from entering the event. At this event it was announced a planned victory rally for Farage the next day in Clacton was cancelled. According to subsequent reporting by independent journalist David Hollas and the East Anglia Bylines on 24 August, the event was refused authorisation by Tendring District Council, and an application for a Late Temporary Event Notice was not submitted in time. Tendring District Council are currently investigating whether the event was adequately licensed, which could result in fines or a custodial sentence for the organiser. Reform UK state no rules were broken.

The parliamentary standards investigation into Farage's finances, suspended following his resignation as an MP, resumed the day after the by-election.

Speaking on ITV's Good Morning Britain on the day after the election, Reform UK's Nadhim Zahawi alleged that Count Binface had received £180,000 in funding from Dale Vince, and had "activists from the Conservative Party and from Labour going out to try and knock on doors for him." Count Binface responded on social media that: "Dale Vince has never donated to me, and at no point have I asked activists from any other party to knock on doors for me. If anyone did so, it was not at my direction and was of their own volition." He invited Zahawi to "correct the record at his earliest convenience". On the following Monday's edition of Good Morning Britain, presenter Ranvir Singh issued an on-air clarification, acknowledging that, while Vince had offered financial support to Count Binface, it was not accepted, and repeating Binface's statement that he had never asked activists from other parties to knock on doors for him.

== Previous result ==
General election 2024: Clacton
| Party | Candidate | Votes | % | ±% |
|---|---|---|---|---|
| Reform | Nigel Farage | 21,225 | 46.2 | N/A |
| Conservative | Giles Watling | 12,820 | 27.9 | −44.0 |
| Labour | Jovan Owusu-Nepaul | 7,448 | 16.2 | +0.6 |
| Liberal Democrats | Matthew Bensilum | 2,016 | 4.4 | −1.8 |
| Green | Natasha Osben | 1,935 | 4.2 | +1.3 |
| Independent | Tony Mack (Note: Mack was originally announced as the Reform UK candidate, but was de-selected in favour of Nigel Farage, and subsequently ran as an independent.) | 317 | 0.7 | N/A |
| UKIP | Andrew Pemberton | 116 | 0.3 | N/A |
| Climate | Craig Jamieson | 48 | 0.1 | N/A |
| Heritage | Tasos Papanastasiou | 33 | 0.1 | N/A |
| Majority | | 8,405 | 18.3 | |
| Turnout | | 45,958 | 58.7 | −2.6 |
| Rejected ballots | | 111 | 0.2 | |
| Registered electors | | 78,245 | | |
| Reform gain from Conservative | | Swing | +45.1 | |

== See also ==
- List of United Kingdom by-elections (2024–present)
- 1986 Northern Ireland by-elections – similar by-elections where 15 of the 17 Northern Irish seats were vacated in protest of the Anglo-Irish Agreement and led to the re-election of all but one of the MPs.
- Tatton in the 1997 general election – Martin Bell won a seat at the 1997 United Kingdom general election in the constituency of Tatton as an independent candidate after the major parties stood down to give him an unopposed run against sitting Conservative MP Neil Hamilton who was under investigation by the Parliamentary Standards Commissioner.
- 2008 Haltemprice and Howden by-election – in which then-Shadow Home Secretary David Davis stood down to recontest the seat to spark debate on civil liberties. Similarly to Clacton, major parties stood aside, either due to supporting the campaign (the Liberal Democrats) or branding it a "political stunt" (Labour).
- South Thanet – the constituency where Farage stood in the 2015 general election, in which one of the other candidates was comedian Al Murray in character as the Pub Landlord; he came sixth with 0.6%.
- 1993 Tauranga by-election – a by-election in New Zealand where all main parties did not contest the resignation of the sitting MP Winston Peters; the McGillicuddy Serious Party came second with 2.15%.
