= 2001 Dayton mayoral election =

- November 6, 2001
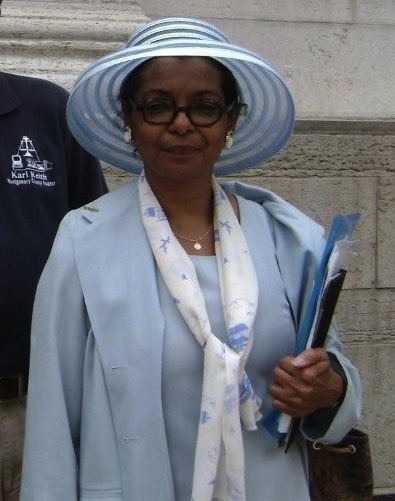

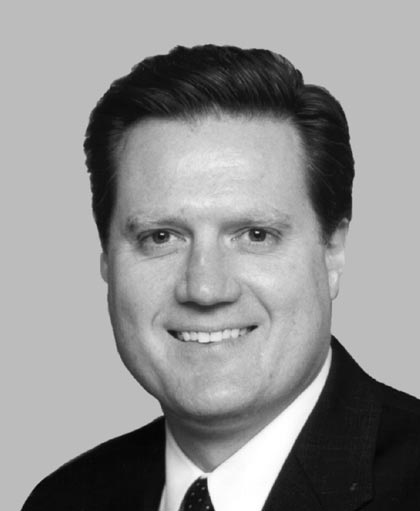
Candidate	Rhine McLin	Mike Turner
Party	Nonpartisan	Nonpartisan
Popular vote	18,850	17,676
Percentage	51.61%	48.39%
Mayor before election
Mike Turner
Nonpartisan
Elected mayor
Rhine McLin
Nonpartisan

The 2001 Dayton mayoral election took place on November 6, 2001. Incumbent Mayor Mike Turner ran for re-election to a third term. He was challenged by State Senator Rhine McLin. Because Turner and McLin were the only two candidates to file for the election, no May primary was held and they both proceeded to the November general election.

Though the race was formally nonpartisan, McLin, a Democrat, was endorsed by the Montgomery County Democratic Party, and Terry McAuliffe, the Chairman of the Democratic National Committee, campaigned for her.

McLin ultimately defeated Turner by a narrow margin, winning 52 percent of the vote to his 48 percent, becoming the city's first female mayor.

== General election ==
=== Candidates ===
- Rhine McLin, State Senator
- Mike Turner, incumbent Mayor

=== Results ===
2001 Dayton mayoral election results
Party	Candidate	Votes	%
Nonpartisan	Rhine McLin	18,850	51.61%
Nonpartisan	Mike Turner (inc.)	17,676	48.39%
Total votes		36,526	100.00%
