= List of electoral wards in the East Riding of Yorkshire =

This is a list of electoral divisions and wards in the ceremonial county of East Riding of Yorkshire in Yorkshire and the Humber. All changes since the re-organisation of local government following the passing of the Local Government Act 1972 are shown. The number of councillors elected for each electoral division or ward is shown in brackets.

== Unitary authority councils ==
=== East Riding of Yorkshire ===
Wards from 1 April 1996 (first election 4 May 1995) to 1 May 2003:

1. Beverley Rural (2)
2. Boothferry West (2)
3. Bridlington North (3)
4. Bridlington Old Town (3)
5. Bridlington South (3)
6. Cottingham North (3)
7. Cottingham South (2)
8. Dale (3)
9. Driffield & Rural (3)
10. East Wolds & Coastal (3)
11. Goole (2)
12. Hessle (2)
13. Howden (1)
14. Howdenshire (3)
15. Mid Holderness (3)
16. Minster (3)
17. North East Holderness (3)
18. Pocklington Provincial (3)
19. Snaith, Airmyn & Rawcliffe & Marshland (2)
20. South Hunsley (3)
21. South West Holderness (3)
22. St Mary's (2)
23. Tranby (3)
24. Wolds Weighton (3)
25. Wolfreton (2)

Wards from 1 May 2003 to present:

1. Beverley Rural (3)
2. Bridlington Central & Old Town (2)
3. Bridlington North (3)
4. Bridlington South (3)
5. Cottingham North (2)
6. Cottingham South (2)
7. Dale (3)
8. Driffield & Rural (3)
9. East Wolds & Coastal (3)
10. Goole North (2)
11. Goole South (2)
12. Hessle (3)
13. Howden (1)
14. Howdenshire (3)
15. Mid Holderness (3)
16. Minster & Woodmansey (3)
17. North Holderness (2)
18. Pocklington Provincial (3)
19. Snaith, Airmyn, Rawcliffe & Marshland (2)
20. South East Holderness (3)
21. South Hunsley (2)
22. South West Holderness (3)
23. St Mary's (3)
24. Tranby (2)
25. Willerby & Kirk Ella (3)
26. Wolds Weighton (3)

=== Kingston upon Hull ===
Wards from 1 April 1974 (first election 7 June 1973) to 5 May 1983:

Wards from 5 May 1983 to 2 May 2002:

Wards from 2 May 2002 to 3 May 2018:

1. Avenue (3)
2. Beverley (2)
3. Boothferry (3)
4. Bransholme East (2)
5. Bransholme West (2)
6. Bricknell (2)
7. Derringham (3)
8. Drypool (3)
9. Holderness (3)
10. Ings (3)
11. Kings Park (2)
12. Longhill (3)
13. Marfleet (3)
14. Myton (3)
15. Newington (3)
16. Newland (2)
17. Orchard Park & Greenwood (3)
18. Pickering (3)
19. St Andrew's (2)
20. Southcoates East (2)
21. Southcoates West (2)
22. Sutton (3)
23. University (2)

Wards from 3 May 2018 to present:

1. Avenue (3)
2. Beverley & Newland (3)
3. Boothferry (3)
4. Bricknell (2)
5. Central (2)
6. Derringham (3)
7. Drypool (3)
8. Holderness (3)
9. Ings (2)
10. Kingswood (2)
11. Longhill & Bilton Grange (3)
12. Marfleet (3)
13. Newington & Gipsyville (3)
14. North Carr (3)
15. Orchard Park (3)
16. Pickering (2)
17. Southcoates (3)
18. St Andrew's & Docklands (3)
19. Sutton (3)
20. University (2)
21. West Carr (3)

== Former county council ==
=== Humberside ===
Electoral Divisions from 1 April 1974 (first election 12 April 1973) to 7 May 1981:

1. Barton upon Humber (1)
2. Beverley (Minster) (1)
3. Beverley (St Marys) (1)
4. Beverley Rural No. 1 (1)
5. Beverley Rural No. 2 (1)
6. Beverley Rural No. 3 (1)
7. Beverley Rural No. 4 (1)
8. Bridlington No. 1 (1)
9. Bridlington No. 2 (1)
10. Bridlington No. 3 (Old Town East) (1)
11. Bridlington No. 4 (Quay North) (1)
12. Bridlington Rural (1)
13. Brigg (1)
14. Cleethorpes No. 1 (Alexandra) (1)
15. Cleethorpes No. 2 (South) (1)
16. Cleethorpes No. 3 (2)
17. Driffield (1)
18. Driffield Rural (1)
19. Glanford Brigg No. 1 (1)
20. Glanford Brigg No. 2 (1)
21. Glanford Brigg No. 3 (1)
22. Glanford Brigg No. 4 (1)
23. Glanford Brigg No. 5 (1)
24. Goole No. 1 (1)
25. Goole No. 2 (1)
26. Goole Rural (1)
27. Grimsby No. 1 (East Marsh) (1)
28. Grismby No. 2 (Littlecoates) (1)
29. Grimsby No. 3 (Springfield) (1)
30. Grimsby No. 4 (Alexandra) (1)
31. Grimsby No. 5 (Weelsby) (1)
32. Grimsby No. 6 (West) (1)
33. Grimsby No. 7 (Clee) (1)
34. Grimsby No. 8 (Central) (1)
35. Grimsby No. 9 (Littlefield) (1)
36. Grimsby No. 10 (Nunsthorpe) (1)
37. Grimsby No. 11 (Wellow) (1)
38. Grimsby Rural No. 1 (Humberstone) (1)
39. Grimsby Rural No. 2 (Laceby) (1)
40. Grimsby Rural No. 3 (Immingham) (1)
41. Haltemprice (Central) (2)
42. Haltemprice (Cottingham) (2)
43. Haltemprice (Hessle) (2)
44. Holderness No. 1 (1)
45. Holderness No. 2 (1)
46. Holderness No. 3 (1)
47. Hornsea (1)
48. Howden No. 1 (1)
49. Howden No. 2 (1)
50. Isle of Axholme No. 1 (West Butterw (1)
51. Isle of Axholme No. 2 (Epworth) (1)
52. Kingston upon Hull No. 1 (Longhill) (3)
53. Kingston upon Hull No. 2 (Greatfiel (3)
54. Kingston upon Hull No. 3 (Holdernes (3)
55. Kingston upon Hull No. 4 (Stoneferr (3)
56. Kingston upon Hull No. 5 (Drypool/M (3)
57. Kingston upon Hull No. 6 (Coltman/S (3)
58. Kingston upon Hull No. 7 (Pickering (3)
59. Kingston upon Hull No. 8 (Boothferr (3)
60. Kingston upon Hull No. 9 (Beverley/ (3)
61. Kingston upon Hull No. 10 (Avenue/N (3)
62. Kingston upon Hull No. 11 (Greenwoo (3)
63. Pocklington No. 1 (1)
64. Pocklington No. 2 (1)
65. Scunthorpe No. 1 (Ashby) (1)
66. Scunthorpe No. 2 (Brumby) (1)
67. Scunthorpe No. 3 (Crosby Town) (1)
68. Scunthorpe No. 4 (Frodingham & Gran (1)
69. Scunthorpe No. 5 (Lincoln Gardens) (1)
70. Scunthorpe No. 6 (Park) (1)
71. Scunthorpe No. 7 (Riddings) (1)
72. Scunthorpe No. 8 (West) (1)
73. Withernsea (1)

Electoral Divisions from 7 May 1981 to 1 April 1996 (county abolished):

1. Alexandra (1)
2. Ashby (1)
3. Avenue (1)
4. Bellfield (1)
5. Beverley Rural (1)
6. Bilton Grange (1)
7. Boothferry West (1)
8. Bottesford (1)
9. Bridlington North (1)
10. Bridlington Old Town (1)
11. Bridlington South (1)
12. Brumby (1)
13. Cottingham North (1)
14. Cottingham South (1)
15. Croft Baker (1)
16. Crosby/Park (1)
17. Dale (1)
18. Derringham (1)
19. Driffield & Rural (1)
20. Drypool (1)
21. East Bransholme (1)
22. East Ella (1)
23. East Park (1)
24. East Wolds & Coastal (1)
25. Endike (1)
26. Ermine (1)
27. Ferry (Glanford) (1)
28. Ferry (Hull) (1)
29. Freshney (1)
30. Frodingham/Town (1)
31. Goole (1)
32. Haven (1)
33. Haverstoe (1)
34. Heneage (1)
35. Hessle (1)
36. Howdenshire (1)
37. Humberston (1)
38. Immingham (1)
39. Inglemire (1)
40. Kingsway (1)
41. Lincoln Gardens (1)
42. Longhill (1)
43. Marfleet (1)
44. Marsh (1)
45. Mid Boothferry (1)
46. Mid Holderness (1)
47. Minster (1)
48. Myton (1)
49. Newington (1)
50. Newland (1)
51. North East (1)
52. North Holderness (1)
53. Orchard Park (1)
54. Park (Cleethorpes) (1)
55. Park (Grimsby) (1)
56. Park (Hull) (1)
57. Pickering (1)
58. Pocklington Provincial (1)
59. Ridge (1)
60. Scartho (1)
61. South (1)
62. South Axholme (1)
63. South Hunsley (1)
64. Southeast Holderness (1)
65. Southwest Holderness (1)
66. St Andrews (1)
67. St Marys (1)
68. Sutton (1)
69. Tranby (1)
70. West Bransholme (1)
71. Wold (1)
72. Wold Parishes (1)
73. Wolds Weighton (1)
74. Wolfreton (1)
75. Yarborough (1)

== Former district councils ==
=== Boothferry ===
Wards from 1 April 1974 (first election 7 June 1973) to 6 May 1976:

Wards from 6 May 1976 to 1 April 1996 (district abolished):

=== East Yorkshire ===
Wards from 1 April 1974 (first election 7 June 1973) to 6 May 1976:

Wards from 6 May 1976 to 1 April 1996 (district abolished):

=== East Yorkshire Borough of Beverley ===
Wards from 1 April 1974 (first election 7 June 1973) to 3 May 1979:

Wards from 3 May 1979 to 1 April 1996 (district abolished):

=== Holderness ===
Wards from 1 April 1974 (first election 7 June 1973) to 6 May 1976:

Wards from 6 May 1976 to 1 April 1996 (district abolished):

== Electoral wards by constituency ==
Wards as they existed on 1 December 2020.

=== Beverley and Holderness ===
East Riding: Beverley Rural; Mid Holderness; Minster & Woodmansey; St. Mary’s; South East Holderness; South West Holderness.

=== Bridlington and The Wolds ===
East Riding: Bridlington Central and Old Town; Bridlington North; Bridlington South; Driffield & Rural, East Wolds & Coastal, North Holderness, Wolds Weighton (polling districts ZC, ZD, ZG, ZH, ZI, ZJ, ZK, ZL, ZM, ZN, ZO, ZP, ZR, ZS, ZT, ZW, ZX (excluding Stamford Bridge Parish), ZZA, ZZB & ZZC).

=== Goole and Pocklington ===
East Riding: Dale; Goole North; Goole South; Howden; Howdenshire; Pocklington Provincial; Snaith, Airmyn, Rawcliffe & Marshland; South Hunsley; Wolds Weighton (polling districts ZA, ZB, ZE, ZF, ZQ, ZU, ZV, ZX (Stamford Bridge Parish only), ZY & ZZ).

=== Kingston upon Hull East ===
Hull: Drypool; Holderness; Ings; Longhill & Bilton Grange; Marfleet; North Carr; Southcoates; Sutton.

=== Kingston upon Hull North and Cottingham ===
East Riding: Cottingham North; Cottingham South.

Hull: Avenue; Beverley & Newland; Bricknell; Central; Kingswood; Orchard Park; University; West Carr.

=== Kingston upon Hull West and Hessle ===
East Riding: Hessle; Tranby; Willerby & Kirk Ella.

Hull: Boothferry; Derringham; Newington & Gipsyville; Pickering; St. Andrew’s & Docklands.

== See also ==
- List of parliamentary constituencies in Humberside
