= 2001 Charlotte mayoral election =

- 6 November 2001
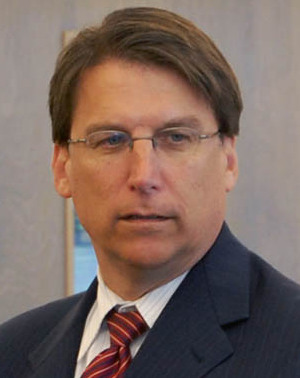

Nominee	Pat McCrory	Ella Scarborough
Party	Republican	Democratic
Popular vote	62,378	30,839
Percentage	65.18%	32.22%
- Precinct results McCrory: 50–60% 60–70% 70–80% 80–90% >90% Scarborough: 50–60% 60–70% 70–80% 80–90% >90% No data
Mayor before election
Pat McCrory
Republican
Elected mayor
Pat McCrory
Republican

The Charlotte mayoral election of 2001 was held in Tuesday November 6, 2001 to elect a Mayor of Charlotte, North Carolina. It was won by Republican incumbent Pat McCrory, who won a fourth consecutive term by defeating Democratic nominee Ella Scarborough in the general election.

== Primaries ==
2001 Charlotte mayoral election – Democratic primary
Party	Candidate	Votes	%	±%
Democratic	Ella Scarborough	12,868	63.63	
Democratic	Susan Burgess	6,013	29.73	
Democratic	Ron Morgan	1,341	6.63	
Turnout		20,198	12.39	

Pat McCrory won the Republican nomination unopposed.

== General election ==
2001 Charlotte mayoral election
Party	Candidate	Votes	%	±%
Republican	Pat McCrory (incumbent)	62,378	65.18	
Democratic	Ella Scarborough	30,839	32.22	
Other	Others	2,490	2.60	
Turnout		95,707	26.71	
