= 2001 United States gubernatorial elections =

- November 6, 2001

3 governorships 2 states; 1 territory
	Majority party	Minority party
Party	Republican	Democratic
Seats before	29	19
Seats after	27	21
Seat change	▼2	▲2
Popular vote	1,815,408	2,241,030
Percentage	44.13%	54.47%
Seats up	2	0
Seats won	0	2
- Map of the results Democratic gain Republican hold No election

United States gubernatorial elections were held on November 6, 2001, in two states and one territory, as well as other statewide offices and members of state legislatures.

Democrats successfully recaptured the open-seat governorships of Virginia and New Jersey, which were both last won by a Democrat in 1989. Republicans held the governorship of the Northern Mariana Islands. This was a very unusual achievement, given that President Bush was at the peak of his popularity following the September 11 attacks.

== Race Summary ==
=== States ===
State	Incumbent	Party	First elected	Result	Candidates
New Jersey	Donald DiFrancesco	Republican	2001 (Note: DiFrancesco took office after his predecessor (Christine Todd Whitman) resigned.)	Incumbent retired. New governor elected. Democratic gain.	✓ Jim McGreevey (Democratic) 56.4%; Bret Schundler (Republican) 41.7%; Bill Schluter (Independent) 1.1%
Virginia	Jim Gilmore	Republican	1997	Incumbent term-limited. New governor elected. Democratic gain.	✓ Mark Warner (Democratic) 52.2%; Mark Earley (Republican) 47.0%

=== Territory ===
Territory	Incumbent	Party	First elected	Result	Candidates
Northern Mariana Islands	Pedro Tenorio	Republican	1997	Incumbent retired. New governor elected. Republican hold.	✓ Juan Babauta (Republican) 44.6%; Benigno Fitial (Covenant) 25.5%; Jesus Borja (Democratic) 18.2%; Froilan Tenorio (Reform) 11.7%

== Closest races ==
States where the margin of victory was under 10%:

1. Virginia, 5.1%

== New Jersey ==
2001 New Jersey gubernatorial election
- November 6, 2001
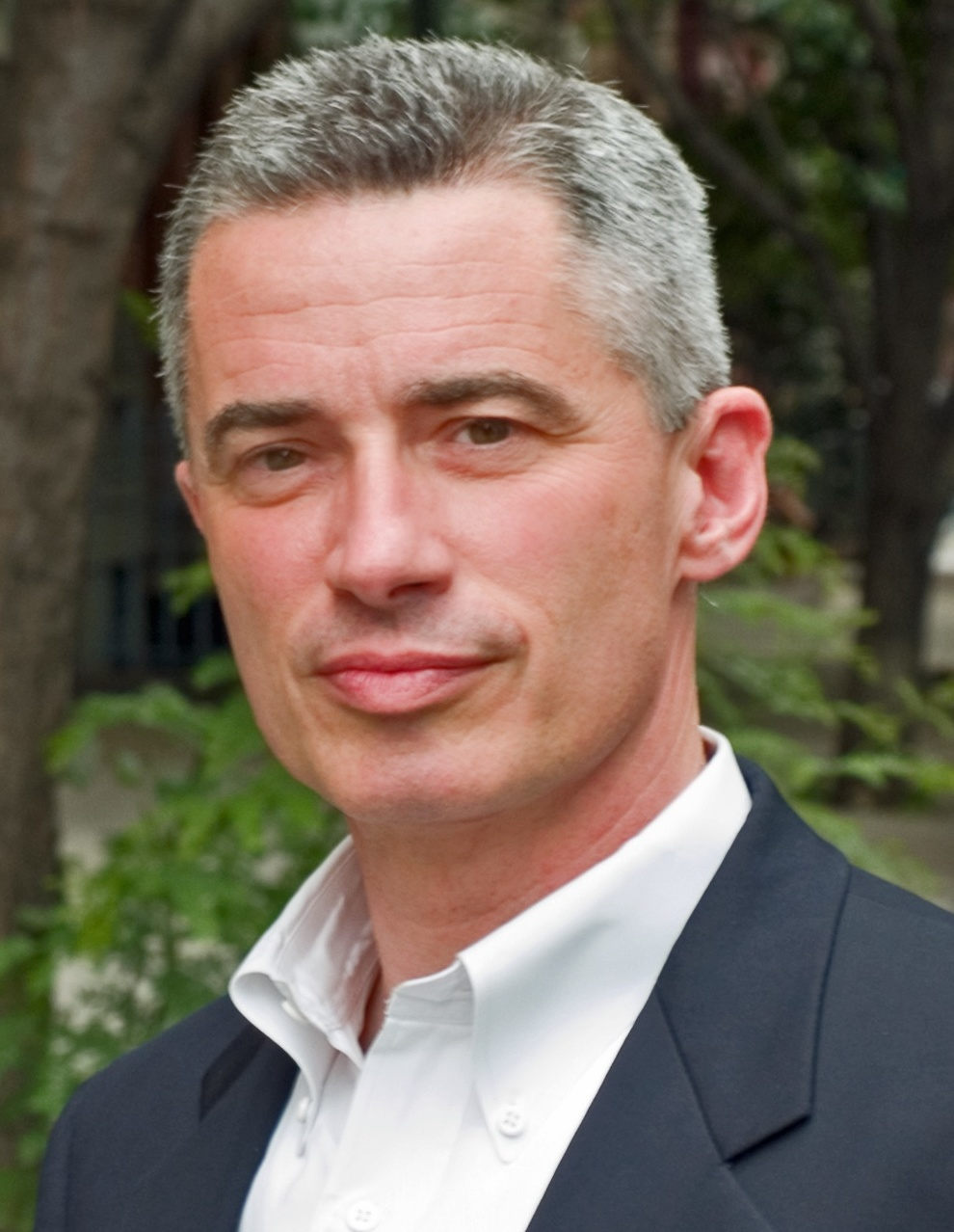

Nominee	Jim McGreevey	Bret Schundler
Party	Democratic	Republican
Popular vote	1,256,853	928,174
Percentage	56.4%	41.7%
- County results McGreevey: 40–50% 50–60% 60–70% 70–80% Schundler: 40–50% 50–60% 60–70%
Governor before election
Richard Codey (acting)
Democratic
Elected Governor
Jim McGreevey
Democratic

The 2001 New Jersey gubernatorial election was a race for the governor of New Jersey. It was held on November 6, 2001. Primaries took place on June 25. Democratic nominee Jim McGreevey won the general election with 56% of the vote — the first majority-elected governor since James Florio in 1989. His Republican opponent in that race was Bret Schundler.

This is also the most recent statewide election in which the Democrat won Monmouth and Ocean counties. This was the first time since 1973 that a Democrat won without carrying Cape May County. McGreevey resigned in November 2004 after admitting that he was a gay man and ethical issues surrounding his governorship; he was succeeded by Senate President Richard Codey, who filled the remainder of McGreevey's term until January 2006.

== Virginia ==
2001 Virginia gubernatorial election
- November 6, 2001
- Turnout: 46.4% ▼3.1
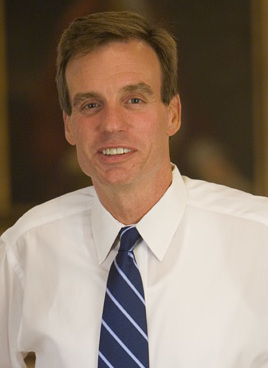

Nominee	Mark Warner	Mark Earley
Party	Democratic	Republican
Popular vote	984,177	887,234
Percentage	52.2%	47.0%
- County and independent city results Warner: 40–50% 50–60% 60–70% 70–80% 80–90% Earley: 40–50% 50–60% 60–70%
Governor before election
Jim Gilmore
Republican
Elected Governor
Mark Warner
Democratic

The 2001 Virginia gubernatorial election was held on November 6, 2001. Incumbent Republican governor Jim Gilmore was barred from seeking a second term; Democratic nominee Mark Warner, the 1996 Democratic nominee for the U.S. Senate and former chair of the Democratic Party of Virginia, defeated Republican nominee Mark Earley, the attorney general of Virginia.

== Territories ==
=== Northern Mariana Islands ===
Northern Marina Islands election
Party	Candidate	Votes	%
Republican	Juan Babauta	{{{votes}}}	44.6%
Covenant	Benigno Fitial	{{{votes}}}	25.5%
Democratic	Jesus Borja	{{{votes}}}	18.2%
Total votes		{{{votes}}}	100.00
Republican hold			
