= 2026 Northern Mariana Islands Attorney General election =

American state election

- November 3, 2026
Nominee	Mike Evangelista	Robby Glass	Joaquin Torres
Party	Independent	Independent	Independent
Incumbent Attorney General
Edward Manibusan
Democratic

The 2026 Northern Mariana Islands Attorney General election was held on November 3, 2026, to elect the attorney general of the Northern Mariana Islands. Incumbent attorney general Edward Manibusan declined to run for re-election to a fourth term.

== Candidates ==
=== Declared ===
- Mike Evangelista, attorney
- Robby Glass, Chief Solicitor at the Office of the Attorney General
- Joaquin Torres, attorney

=== Declined ===
- Edward Manibusan, incumbent attorney general of the Northern Mariana Islands (2015–present)

== Results ==
=== Advanced to runoff ===
- Mike Evangelista, attorney
- Joaquin Torres, attorney

== See also ==
- 2026 United States attorney general elections
- Elections in the Northern Mariana Islands
