= 2022 Northern Mariana Islands Attorney General election =

American state election

- November 8, 2022
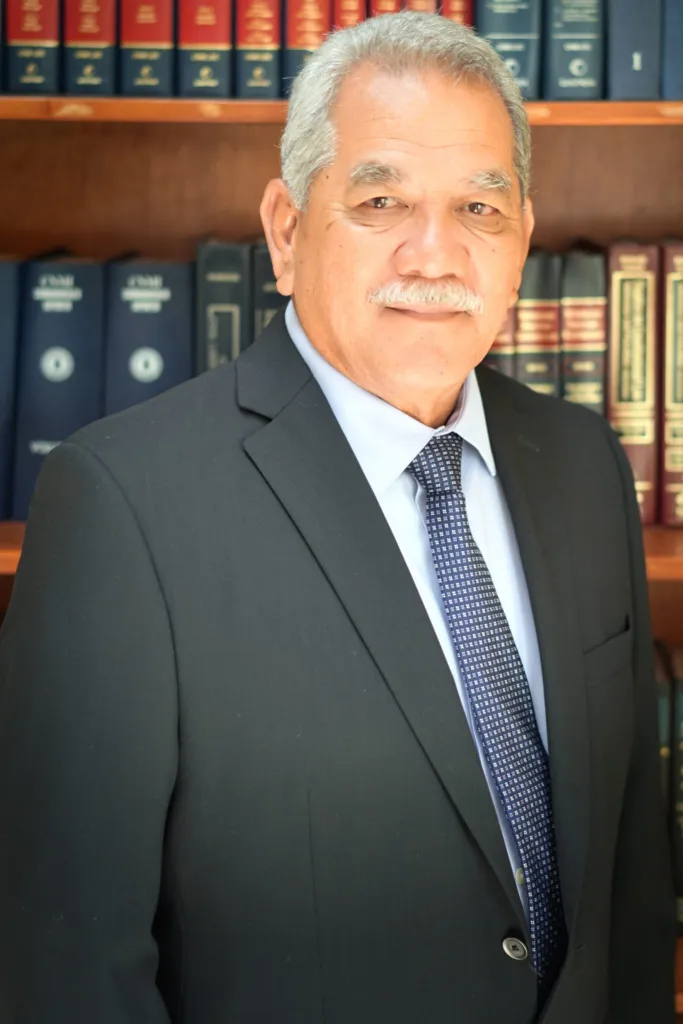

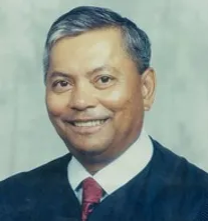
Nominee	Edward Manibusan	Juan Tudela Lizama
Party	Independent	Independent
- Manibusan: 50–55% 55–60% 60–65% Lizama: 50–55% 65–70% 95–100%
Attorney General before election
Edward Manibusan
Independent
Elected Attorney General
Edward Manibusan
Independent

The 2022 Northern Mariana Islands Attorney General election took place on November 8, 2022, to elect the attorney general of the Northern Mariana Islands. Incumbent Edward Manibusan won re-election to a third term, defeating former judge Juan Tudela Lizama.

== Candidates ==
=== Declared ===
- Edward Manibusan, incumbent attorney general of the Northern Mariana Islands (2015–present)
- Juan Tudela Lizama, former associate judge and candidate in the 2008 United States House of Representatives election in Northern Mariana Islands

== Results ==
2022 Northern Mariana Islands Attorney General election
Party	Candidate	Votes	%
Nonpartisan politician	Edward Manibusan	7,524	55.17%
Nonpartisan politician	Juan Tudela Lizama	6,113	44.83%
Total votes		13,637	100.0%
