= Joaquin Torres (politician) =

AG-elect of CNMI

Attorney General of the Northern Mariana Islands
- Elect
- Assuming office January 2027
- Governor: Ralph Torres (elect)
- Succeeding: Edward Manibusan

Personal details
- Born: Joaquin Deleon Guerrero Torres
- Party: Independent
- Relatives: Ralph Torres (brother)

Joaquin Deleon Guerrero "Jack" Torres is the Independent elected in the 2026 election for Attorney General of the Northern Mariana Islands. He is the other brother of Ralph Torres.

Legal offices
Preceded by Edward Manibusan	Attorney General of the Northern Mariana Islands; Taking office 2027	Elect
