= Gilbert Birnbrich =

American lawyer (born 1970)

Gilbert Joseph Birnbrich

23rd Attorney General of the Northern Mariana Islands
- In office July 6, 2014 – January 12, 2015; Acting: July 6 – September 24, 2014
- Nominated by: Eloy Inos
- Preceded by: Joey San Nicolas
- Succeeded by: Edward Manibusan

Personal details
- Born: March 27, 1970 (age 56)
- Education: Ohio State University; University of Toledo (JD)

Gilbert Joseph Birnbrich (/ˈbɜːrnbrɪk/ BURN-brik) is an American lawyer who served as the attorney general of the Northern Mariana Islands from 2014 to 2015.

== Early life and career ==
Birnbrich is a native of Columbus, Ohio. He studied law in Ohio, before moving to the Northern Mariana Islands in 2003. He served as a clerk for Judge Alex Munson in the District Court for the Northern Mariana Islands from 2003 to 2006, before working in private practice for attorney Colin Thompson. In February 2010 he joined the CNMI Office of the Attorney General, becoming Chief of the Civil Division in May 2011. On December 30, 2013, he was appointed Deputy Attorney General. While at the OAG Birnbrich was a witness in the criminal trial of his former boss, ex-Attorney General Edward Buckingham, over the events culminating on Saturday, August 4, 2012.

== Attorney General ==
When Attorney General Joey San Nicolas resigned to run for Mayor of Tinian, effective July 5, 2014, Birnbrich became the acting Attorney General. He was then appointed to the post in his own right by Governor Eloy Inos, and confirmed by the Senate in September 2014. Birnbrich was the last Attorney General appointed by a governor before the position became an elected office, as of the 2014 elections.

Legal offices
Preceded by Joey San Nicolas	23rd Attorney General of the Northern Mariana Islands; 2014–2015	Succeeded by Edward Manibusan
