= Edwin P. Aldan =

Mayor of Tinian and Aguiguan

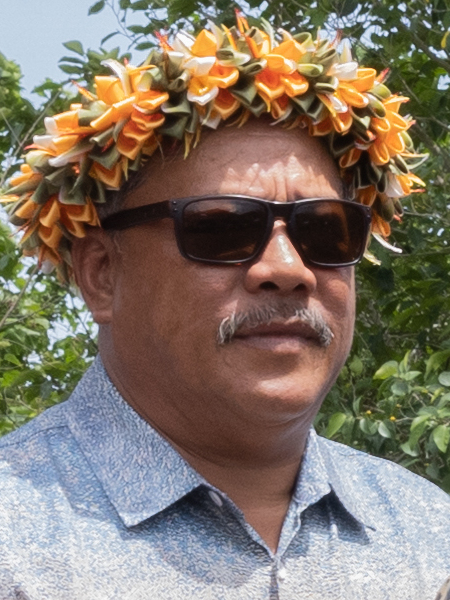
- Aldan in 2024

Mayor of Tinian and Aguiguan
- Incumbent
- Assumed office January 14, 2019
- Preceded by: Joey San Nicolas

Personal details
- Profession: Police officer Politician

Edwin Palacios Aldan is a Northern Mariana Islander politician. He is the incumbent mayor of Tinian. Prior to serving as mayor, he served non-consecutive terms in the Northern Mariana Islands House of Representatives.

== Political career ==
He was elected to the Tinian Municipal Council in 2001 and served as its chairman in 2004. He was elected to the Northern Mariana Islands House of Representatives in the 2005 general election as Covenant Party nominee against incumbent Republican Norman Sablan Palacios. He served in the 15th and 16th Commonwealth Legislatures. He was defeated for reelection by Republican candidate Trenton Brian Conner in the 2009 general election. He made an unsuccessful comeback bid against Conner in 2012. He was elected to the House in 2014 after Conner retired to make an unsuccessful run for the Northern Mariana Islands Senate. He was reelected as a Republican in 2016. He was named chair of the education committee in 2017.

In 2018, he chose not to run for reelection to the CNMI House to run for mayor of Tinian with the support of incumbent mayor Joey San Nicolas. He defeated former senator Henry Hofschneider San Nicolas with 62% of the vote. He was succeeded in the House by fellow Republican Antonio San Nicolas Borja. He was successfully reelected in 2022 without opposition. He is term-limited and cannot run in 2026.
