= Edward Buckingham =

American attorney general

20th Attorney General of the Northern Mariana Islands
- In office 17 August 2009 – 13 August 2012
- Nominated by: Benigno Fitial
- Preceded by: Matthew Gregory
- Succeeded by: Joey San Nicolas

Personal details
- Born: 1948 (age 77–78)
- Education: University of California; Sturm College of Law (JD)
- Profession: Lawyer

Edward Taylor Buckingham III is a former Attorney General of the Commonwealth of the Northern Mariana Islands (CNMI).

== Personal ==
Edward Taylor Buckingham III is the grandson of Edward Taylor Buckingham (b. 1874), Yale Law School Class of 1897, Democratic 48th and 52nd Mayor of Bridgeport, Connecticut from 1909-1911 and 1929-1933.

== Career ==
Buckingham studied law and was admitted to the bar on October 17, 1977 in Denver, Colorado, and after employment with the National Security Agency later practiced municipal defense law. He subsequently served briefly as a government lawyer on Kosrae, Federated States of Micronesia. Mr. Buckingham was hired by CNMI AG Pamela Sue Brown in 2004 as an Assistant AG to represent the Commonwealth with respect to the federal prison consent decree. As an AAG he also advised the Department of Public Safety.

While working in the Office of the Attorney General (OAG) Criminal Division as the traffic prosecutor, AAG Buckingham was nominated by Governor Benigno Fitial to be CNMI AG on Wednesday, August 12, 2009. He was unanimously confirmed by the CNMI Senate two days later, and was sworn in at the cabinet meeting on August 17, 2009. He succeeded Deputy Attorney General Gregory Baka, who had been acting Attorney General since September 28, 2008, and Attorney General Matthew T. Gregory. Citing family matters, on August 1, 2012 he announced his resignation, with his last day of work on August 3, 2012, to be followed by 30 days annual leave. He was succeeded on August 13, 2012 by acting Attorney General Ellsbeth Viola Alepuyo, and then on October 23, 2012 by Attorney General Joey Patrick San Nicolas, who was confirmed by the Senate on November 16, 2012.

=== Criminal prosecution ===
In the early morning hours of Saturday, August 4, 2012, Buckingham attempted to flee the CNMI while being escorted to the airport by Carolinian police personnel assigned by Governor Fitial, to avoid prosecution for charges filed against him by the CNMI Office of the Public Auditor. The charges involved multiple instances of misconduct and corruption while serving as the CNMI Attorney General.

However, he was intercepted by the FBI at the airport, and served a penal summons before boarding his plane. The summons required him to appear in the Superior Court of the Commonwealth of the Northern Mariana Islands on Monday, August 6, 2012. Buckingham claimed he would be back in time for his court appointment, but did not in fact return. While he failed to appear in court, OAG Civil Chief Gil Birnbrich attempted to enter an appearance on his behalf in the criminal case, which was denied by the court, and Birnbrich neglected to inform the judge that Buckingham was available on telephonic standby. A bench warrant was subsequently issued by CNMI Superior Court Associate Judge David Arthur Wiseman for Buckingham's arrest, which was affirmed by the CNMI Supreme Court.

At the end of February, 2013, Governor Eloy Inos (who assumed governorship of the CNMI after Fitial's resignation on February 20, 2013) contacted Iowa governor Terry Branstad to seek his cooperation in apprehending, detaining and extraditing Buckingham, who was believed to be located in Johnson County, Iowa.

Buckingham was arrested in Colorado, and returned to Saipan for criminal prosecution.

On Friday, 31 January 2014, shortly before the scheduled trial date, two of the eleven counts were dismissed by CNMI Superior Court Associate Judge Kenneth Lewis Govendo. Pursuant to a plea agreement, on Thursday, February 20, 2014, Buckingham was found guilty of seven of the charges, issued concurrent sentences of six months to one year imprisonment (all suspended), fined a total of $14,000.00, and was placed on one year of unsupervised probation. He resigned from and is no longer a member of the CNMI Bar Association, and effective May 21, 2014 was suspended for eighteen months from the practice of law in Colorado.

Legal offices
Preceded by Matthew T. Gregory	20th Attorney General of the Northern Mariana Islands; 2009–2012	Succeeded by Joey Patrick San Nicolas
