= Matthew Gregory (attorney) =

Northern Mariana Islands politician

Matthew T. Gregory

18th Attorney General of the Northern Mariana Islands
- In office January 2006 – 27 September 2008
- Nominated by: Benigno Fitial
- Preceded by: Pamela Sue Brown
- Succeeded by: Edward Buckingham

Personal details
- Born: October 29, 1968 (age 57)
- Education: College of William & Mary; University of Illinois College of Law (JD)
- Profession: Lawyer

Matthew Theodore Gregory (born October 29, 1968) is a former Attorney General of the Northern Mariana Islands. He was appointed in January 2006 and served until 27 September 2008. After Gregory's departure, he was succeeded as acting Attorney General by Deputy Attorney General Gregory Baka for nearly eleven months. Eventually, Assistant Attorney General Edward Taylor Buckingham, III was confirmed as Attorney General on August 14, 2009.
