= Tinian International Airport =

Airport in Tinian, Northern Mariana Islands, U.S.

Tinian International Airport West Tinian Airport
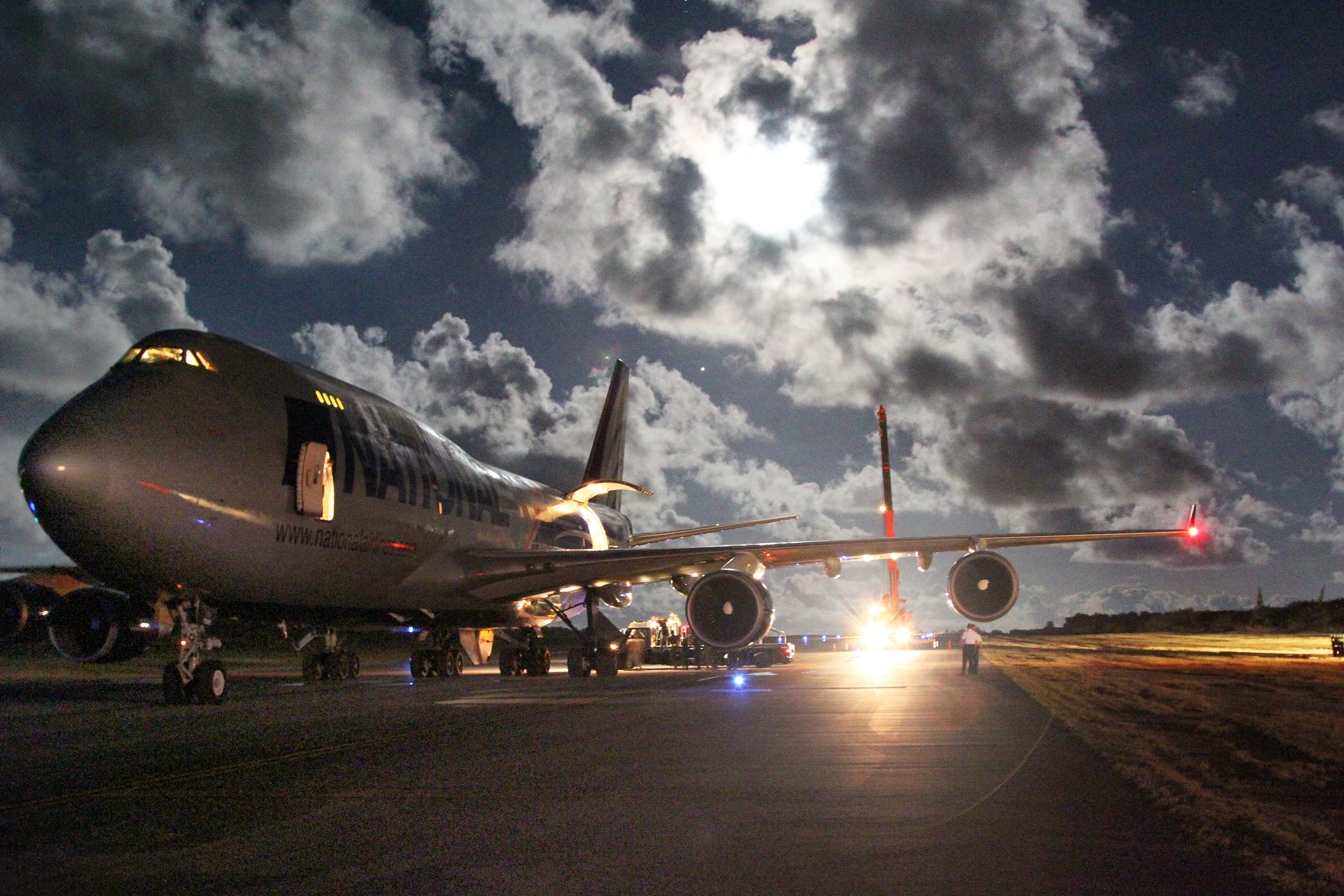
- U.S. Marines unload a Boeing 747-400 carrying gear and equipment for Exercise Forage Fury 2012, November 28, 2012
- IATA: TIQ; ICAO: PGWT; FAA LID: TNI

Summary
- Airport type: Public
- Owner: Commonwealth Ports Authority
- Location: Tinian
- Elevation AMSL: 270 ft (82 m)
- Coordinates: 14°59′57″N 145°37′10″E
- Website: cpa.gov.mp/tinapt.asp

Map
- Location within Northern Mariana Islands

Runways
Direction	Length		Surface
Direction	ft	m	Surface
8/26	8,600	2,621	Asphalt/concrete

Statistics (2022)
- Aircraft operations (year ending March 17, 2022): 29,207
- Source: Federal Aviation Administration

Tinian International Airport (IATA: TIQ, ICAO: PGWT, FAA LID: TNI), also known as West Tinian Airport, is a public airport located on Tinian Island in the United States Commonwealth of the Northern Mariana Islands. This airport is owned by Commonwealth Ports Authority.

This airport is assigned a three-letter location identifier of TNI by the Federal Aviation Administration, but the International Air Transport Association (IATA) airport code is TIQ (IATA assigned TNI to Satna Airport in India). The International Civil Aviation Organization (ICAO) airport code is PGWT. Tinian International Airport is the hub of Star Marianas Air.

== Facilities and aircraft ==
The airport was established on the site of the World War II era West Field.

Tinian International Airport covers an area of 1,416 acres (573 ha) which contains one paved runway (8/26) measuring 8,600 x 150 ft (2,621 x 46 m).

For 12-month period ending March 17, 2022, the airport had 29,207 aircraft operations, an average of 80 per day: 74% air taxi, 26% general aviation and <1% military.

The head office of Star Marianas Air is in Hangar 1 at the airport.

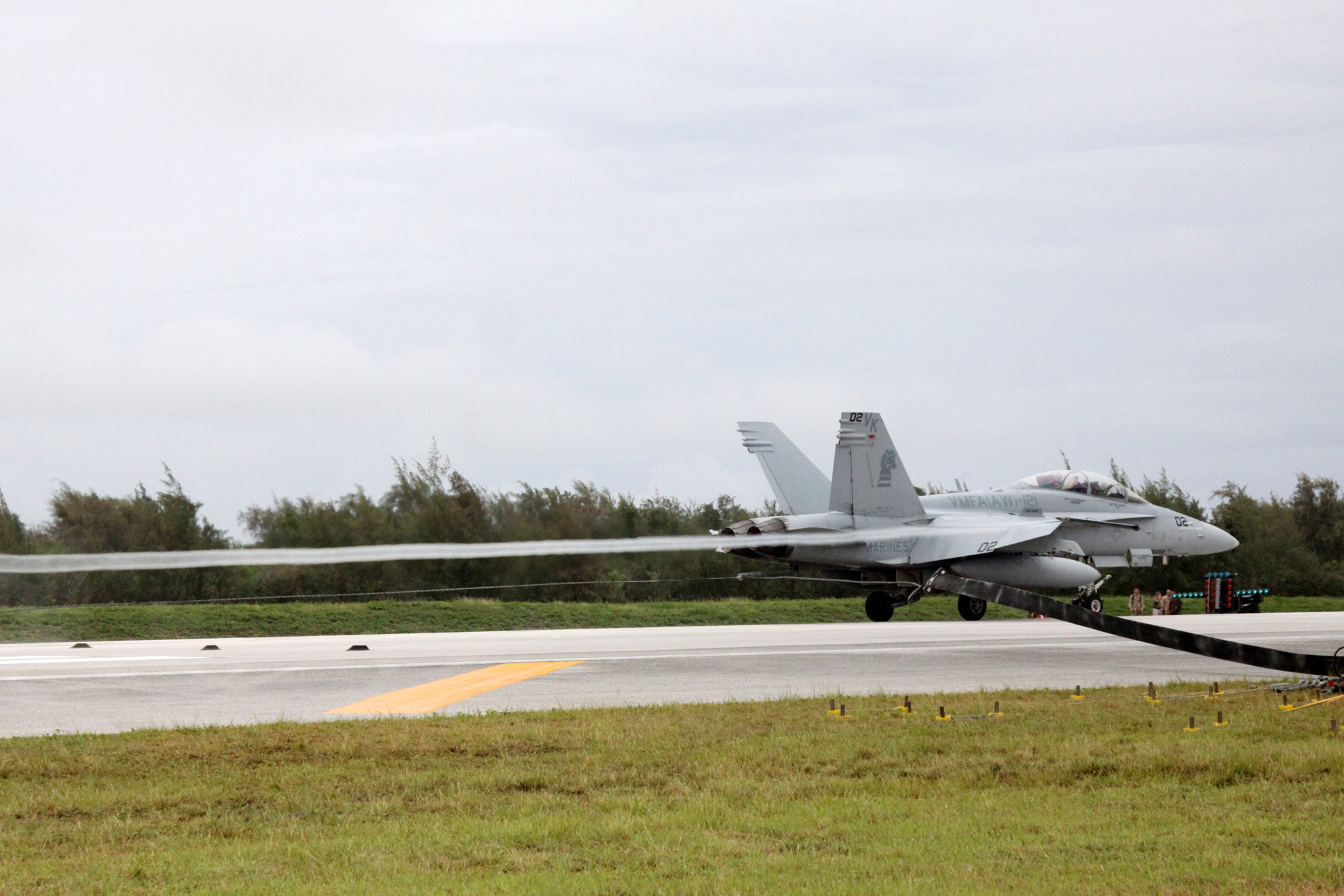
A VMFA-121 F/A-18D Hornet makes an arrested landing in May 2012.

In May 2012, the United States Marine Corps VMFA-121 operated its F/A-18D Hornets from the airport using M-31 expeditionary aircraft arresting gear systems similar to arresting systems used aboard aircraft carriers during Exercise Geiger Fury.

In 2019 the Commonwealth of the Northern Mariana Islands acting through the Commonwealth Ports Authority and the United States Department of Defense signed an agreement to operate a divert airfield at the airport in case Andersen Air Force Base on Guam is unable to be used.

In early March 2023 United States Air Force Lockheed Martin F-22 Raptors deployed to Tinian for the first time from Kadena Air Base, Okinawa as part of exercise Agile Reaper 21–1. Work is planned for 2024 to expand dispersal facilities at Tinian International, as well as restoration of facilities at Tinian North Field.

== Accidents and incidents ==
- On January 7, 1946, a Curtiss R5C-1 Commando (39579) of the USMC undershot the runway on landing and was damaged beyond repair.
