= Rota International Airport =

Airport in Rota Island, Northern Mariana Islands, United States

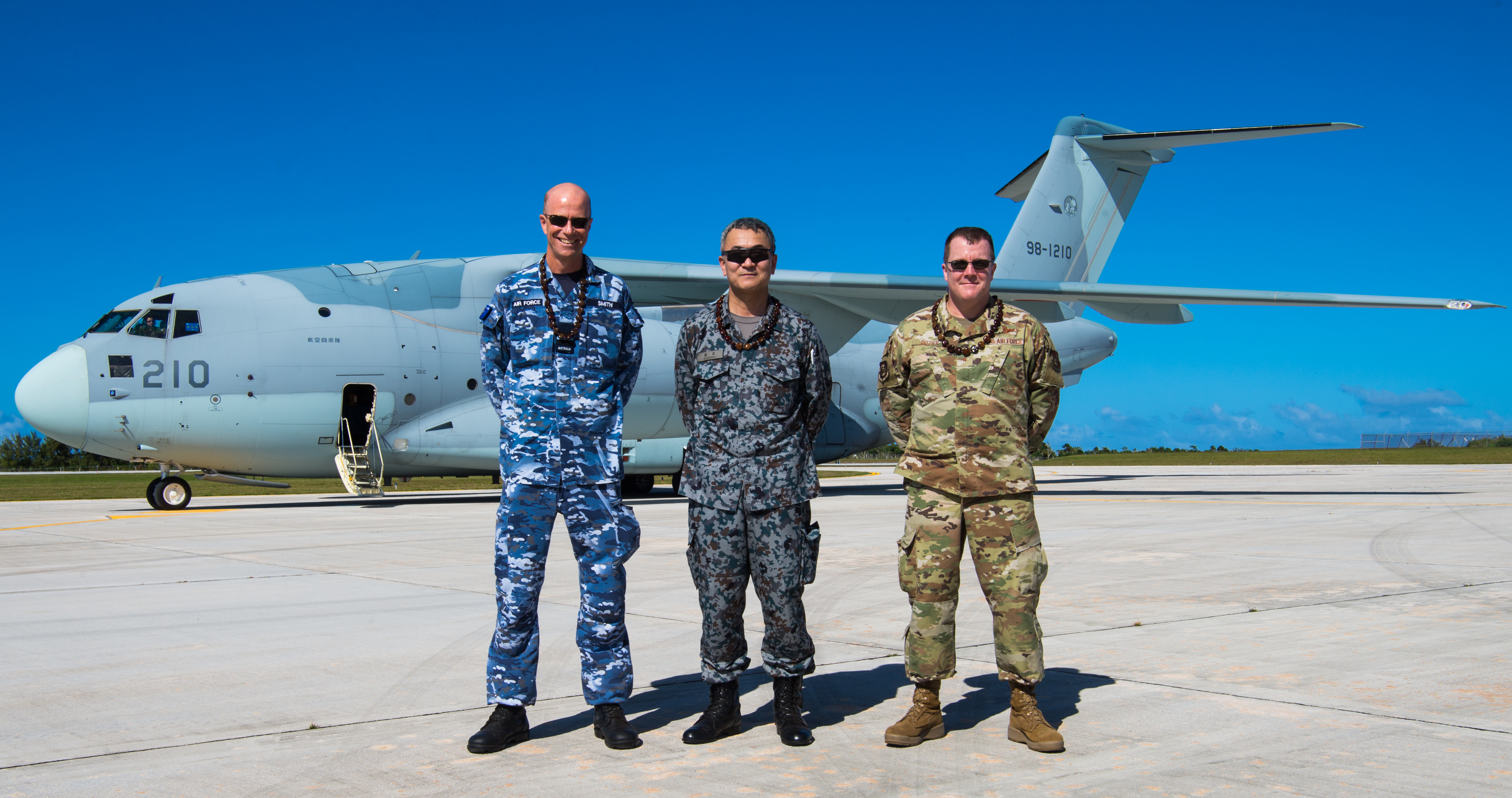
- IATA: ROP; ICAO: PGRO; FAA LID: GRO

Summary
- Airport type: Public
- Owner: Commonwealth Ports Authority
- Location: Rota Island
- Elevation AMSL: 607 ft (185 m)
- Coordinates: 14°10′28″N 145°14′33″E
- Website: cpa.gov.mp/rotarpt.asp

Map
- Location within Northern Mariana Islands

Runways
Direction	Length		Surface
Direction	ft	m	Surface
9/27	6,000	1,829	Asphalt

Statistics (2006)
- Aircraft operations: 6,550
- Source: Federal Aviation Administration

Rota International Airport (IATA: ROP, ICAO: PGRO, FAA LID: GRO), also known as Benjamin Taisacan Manglona International Airport, is a public airport located on Rota Island in the United States Commonwealth of the Northern Mariana Islands (CNMI), near the village of Sinapalo. The airport is owned by the Commonwealth Ports Authority. During WWII the Japanese constructed a single runway which the U.S. bombed out of commission. After the Marines took control of the island, 300 men from the 48th U.S. Naval Construction Battalion made the airfield operational during September–October 1945 and extended the runway to 5,000 feet (1,500 m). The runway was then used as an emergency landing strip for Tinian and Saipan airfields. In modern times it is used for short commuter flights to the nearby Mariana Islands.

Although most U.S. airports use the same three-letter location identifier for the FAA and IATA, Rota International Airport is assigned GRO by the FAA and ROP by the IATA (which assigned GRO to Girona–Costa Brava Airport in Girona, Spain).

== Facilities and aircraft ==
Rota International Airport covers an area of 800 acres (324 ha) which contains one paved runway (9/27) measuring 6,000 x 150 ft (1,829 x 46 m). For a twelve-month period ending March 31, 2006, the airport had 6,550 aircraft operations, an average of 17 per day: 94% air taxi, 4% general aviation and 2% military. Since the CNMI is a separate customs and U.S. immigration jurisdiction, Rota International Airport is a designated port of entry staffed by the CNMI Division of Customs and the U.S. Customs and Border Protection (which conducts immigration inspection only).

The Transportation Security Administration (TSA) began its Rota operations in March 2006. After the creation of TSA in 2002 but before it began operating at Rota Airport in 2006, passengers from Rota had to be screened upon arrival on Guam or Saipan. The lack of TSA at Rota Airport was a nuisance for passengers transiting from Guam through Rota to Saipan, who had to encounter screenings (either customs or security) at all three points.

At one time Rota had at least three airlines operating flights to it including Cape Air, Star Marianas, and Arctic Circle, with aircraft such as the 30 passenger ATR 42 flying routes.

== Airlines and destinations ==
Star Marianas Air connects Rota Airport to Antonio B. Won Pat International Airport (Guam) and Saipan International Airport.
