= Star Marianas Air =

Commuter airline

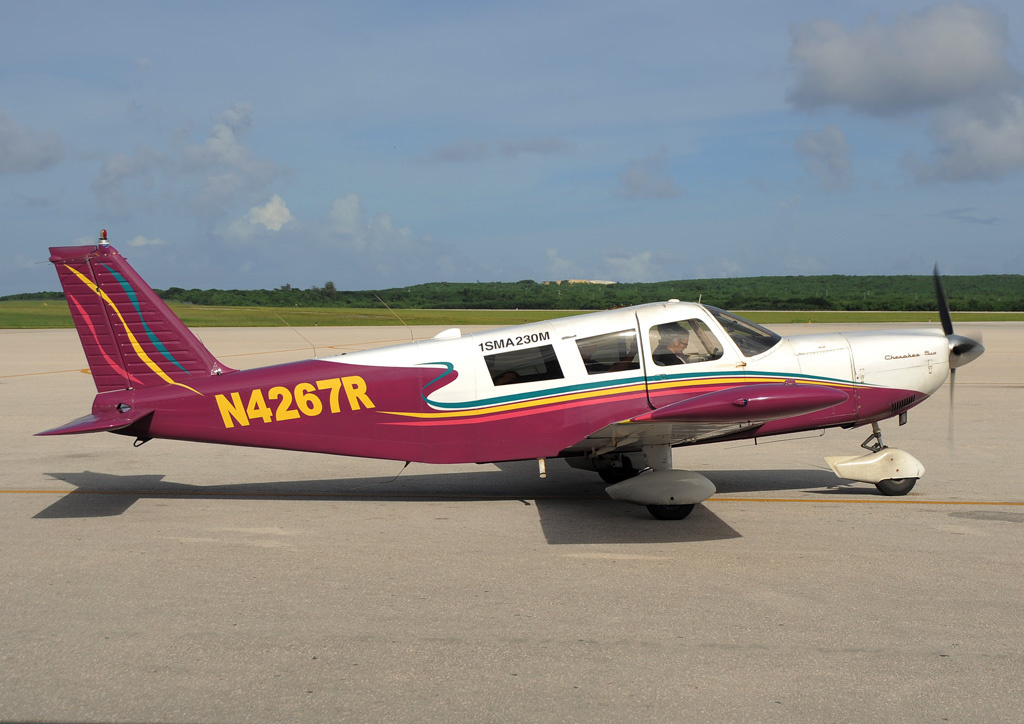
- Founded: 2008
- AOC #: 1SMA230M
- Hubs: Tinian International Airport
- Fleet size: 13
- Destinations: 4
- Headquarters: Tinian Municipality, Commonwealth of the Northern Mariana Islands, US
- Website: www.starmarianasair.com

Star Marianas Air, Inc. is a U.S. commuter airline headquartered at Tinian International Airport in Tinian Municipality, Northern Mariana Islands. It operates scheduled and charter passenger service in the Commonwealth of the Northern Mariana Islands and Guam, both U.S. territories in the Pacific Ocean.

Star Marianas Air has been the only airline linking Guam and the smaller Northern Mariana Islands, and is vital for the Commonwealth's transportation needs. Congressman Gregorio Sablan has pushed for assistance from the Essential Air Service on these routes.

The airline flies small planes between Guam, Saipan, Tinian, and Rota, and was noted on CNN for its short ten minute flights that link the islands together.

== History ==
Star Marianas Air is named after four islands that constitute the three largest municipalities in the Commonwealth of the Northern Mariana Islands, Saipan, Tinian & Aguigan, and Rota.

Star Mariana's Air was founded in 2008 and was approved by the FAA on April 1, 2009, to operate in the Northern Mariana Islands. The first flight took place on 2 April 2009 between the islands Tinian and Saipan with a Piper PA-32.

In 2010, three more Piper PA-32s were purchased, doubling the fleet from three to six aircraft. In 2013, the first of five Piper PA-31s was acquired, and charter flights were added to the islands of Rota and Guam.

In June 2014, the airline was authorized by the FAA and the United States Department of Transportation to operate scheduled flights from Saipan Airport to Rota and Tinian Airports. Previously, there were only charter flights.

The US Department of Transportation granted the airline Commuter Air Carrier status in 2014.

In 2016, the fleet was again expanded to seven Piper PA-32 and five Piper PA-31. In addition, since then, an average of 200 flights per day are being carried out.

In 2016 a non-stop Saipan to Guam route was opened, at that time they operated 11 small Piper aircraft.

In 2021, there was one week halt, and three week disruption to commuter flights.

In 2023, two other airlines ceased operations in the Marianas, Marianas Southern, which flew Tecnam P2012 Traveller, and Asiana, leaving Star Marianas as the sole airline, not counting the United 737 airliner flights between Saipan and Guam.

== Destinations ==
Star Marianas Air flies to four destinations:

- Saipan
- Rota
- Guam
- Tinian

== Fleet ==
Type	Fleet	Orders	Passengers
Piper PA-32-300 Cherokee 6	8	0	5
Piper PA-31-350 Navajo Chieftain	5	0	8
