= Joey San Nicolas =

CNMI politician, Mayor of Tinian (born 1973)

Joey Patrick San Nicolas
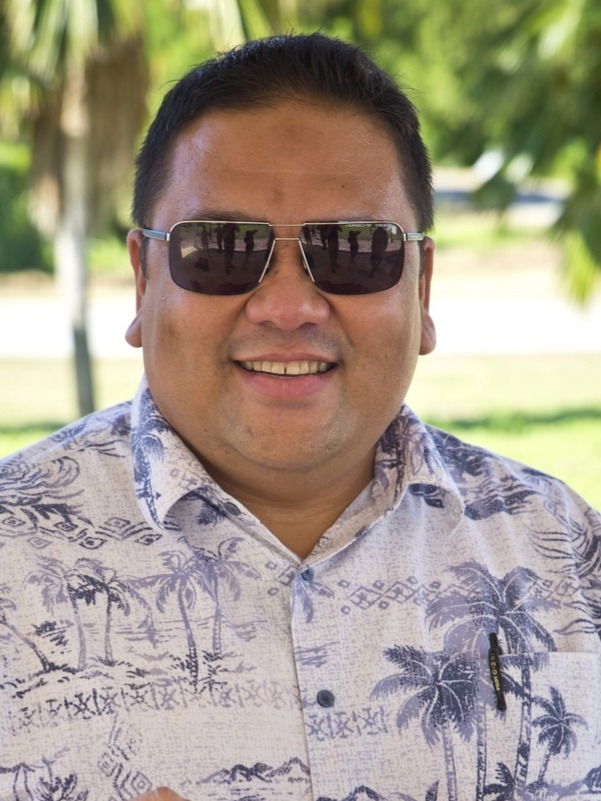
- San Nicolas in 2016

Mayor of Tinian and Aguiguan
- In office January 12, 2015 – January 14, 2019
- Preceded by: Ramon Muña Dela Cruz
- Succeeded by: Edwin P. Aldan

22nd Attorney General of the Northern Mariana Islands
- In office October 23, 2012 – July 5, 2014
- Nominated by: Benigno Fitial
- Preceded by: Edward Buckingham
- Succeeded by: Gilbert Birnbrich

Personal details
- Born: October 10, 1973 (age 52)
- Spouse(s): Vilma Santos (m. 1997; div. 2016); Connie Manglona (m. 2016)
- Children: 5
- Education: Chaminade University; William Mitchell College of Law (JD)
- Profession: Lawyer

Joey Patrick San Nicolas is a politician in the Commonwealth of the Northern Mariana Islands (CNMI) who served as Mayor of Tinian. He previously served as Attorney General.

== Career ==
On Tuesday, October 23, 2012, San Nicolas was nominated as the Attorney General, and appointed in an acting capacity, by Governor Benigno Fitial. On Friday, November 16, 2012, he was unanimously confirmed by the CNMI Senate on his native Tinian and sworn in later that day. He succeeded acting Attorney General Ellsbeth Viola Alepuyo, who was appointed on Monday, August 13, 2012 after Edward Buckingham fled the island in scandal. San Nicolas resigned effective Saturday, July 5, 2014, to run for Mayor of Tinian. He was succeeded by Deputy Attorney General Gilbert Joseph Birnbrich.

San Nicolas was elected Mayor in the 2014 election. San Nicolas chose not to run for reelection in the 2018 general election, instead backing Edwin Palacios Aldan, who represented the 6th District in the Northern Mariana Islands House of Representatives. Aldan won the election and was sworn in as mayor on January 14, 2019.

On February 9, 2026, Governor David M. Apatang announced he would appoint San Nicolas as an associate judge of the CNNI Superior Court. If his appointment is confirmed by the Northern Mariana Islands Senate, he will be the commonwealth's first judge from Tinian.

Legal offices
Preceded by Edward Taylor Buckingham, III	22nd Attorney General of the Northern Mariana Islands; 2012-2014	Succeeded by Gilbert Joseph Birnbrich
