= Tinian, Northern Mariana Islands =

Political division of the Northern Mariana Islands

Tinian
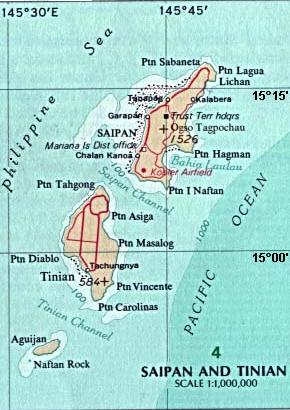
- Tinian on an area map, southwest of Saipan, showing waters around islands and deeper Pacific section.

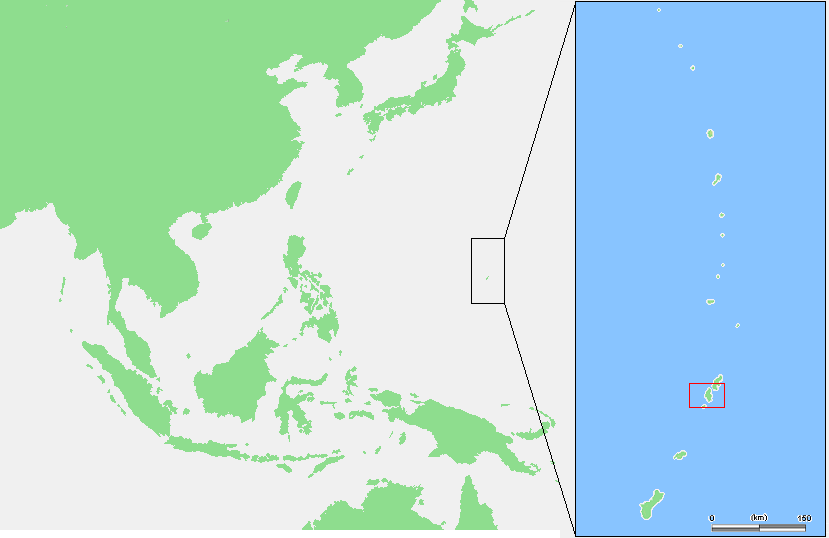

- Location within Pacific Ocean
- Interactive map of Tinian

Geography
- Location: Pacific Ocean
- Coordinates: 15°00′N 145°38′E
- Archipelago: Marianas
- Area: 101.22 km^{2} (39.08 sq mi)
- Highest elevation: 187 m (614 ft)
- Highest point: Mount Kastiyu

Administration
- United States
- Commonwealth: Northern Mariana Islands
- Largest settlement: San Jose

Demographics
- Population: 2,044 (2020)

Tinian (/ˈtɪniən, ˌtiːniˈɑːn/; Chamorro: Tini'an) is one of the three principal islands of the Commonwealth of the Northern Mariana Islands (CNMI). Together with uninhabited neighboring Aguijan, it forms Tinian Municipality, one of the four constituent municipalities of the Northern Marianas. Tinian's largest village is San Jose. Tinian is just south of Saipan, the most populated island, and north of Rota. The island has many World War II historical sites, cattle ranches, and beaches. There are hotels, resorts, and a golf course. A 5-star casino operated from 1998 to 2015.

Saipan is reached by a short airplane ride or a charter boat.

Tinian is part of the United States and the CNMI. Along with Guam, it is the westernmost U.S. island in the Pacific.

== History ==
=== First settlers ===
The Mariana Islands, of which Tinian is one, were the first islands settled by humans in Remote Oceania. It was also the first and the longest of the ocean-crossing voyages of the Austronesian peoples and is separate from the later Polynesian settlement of the rest of Remote Oceania. They were settled around 1500 to 1400 BC by migrants departing from the Philippines. This was followed by a second migration from the Caroline Islands by the first millennium AD, and a third migration from islands in Southeast Asia (likely the Philippines or eastern Indonesia) by 900 AD.

Thousands of years ago, the island was settled by a people who built stone structures all over Tinian called taga.

=== Spanish colonial period ===
Tinian and Saipan were possibly first sighted by Europeans of the Spanish expedition of Ferdinand Magellan when it made landfall in the southern Marianas on March 6, 1521. It was likely sighted next by Gonzalo Gómez de Espinosa in 1522 on board the Spanish ship Trinidad, in an attempt to reach Panama after the death of Magellan. This would have happened after the sighting of the Maug Islands between the end of August and the end of September. Gonzalo de Vigo deserted in the Maugs from the Trinidad, and, in the next four years, living with the Chamorros, visited thirteen main islands in the Marianas, with possibly Tinian among them.

The first clear evidence of European arrival was by the Manila galleon Santa Margarita, commanded by Juan Martínez de Guillistegui, that wrecked in the southeast of Saipan in February 1600 and whose survivors stayed for two years, until 250 of them were rescued by the Santo Tomas and the Jesus María. The Spanish formally occupied Tinian in 1669, with the missionary expedition of Diego Luis de San Vitores, who named it Buenavista Mariana (Goodsight Mariana). From 1670, it became a port of call for Spanish and occasional English, Dutch, and French ships as a supply station for food and water.

The native population, estimated at 40,000 at the time of the Spanish arrival, shrank to less than 1,400 due to European-introduced diseases and conflicts over land. The survivors were forcibly relocated to Guam in 1720 for better control and assimilation. Under Spanish rule, the island was developed into ranches for raising cattle and pigs, which were used to provision Spanish galleons en route to Mexico.

=== German colonial period ===
After the Spanish–American War of 1898, Tinian was sold by Spain to the German Empire in 1899. Germany administered the island as part of German New Guinea. During the German period, there was no attempt to develop or settle the island, which remained under the control of its Spanish and mestizo landowners.

=== Japanese colonial period ===
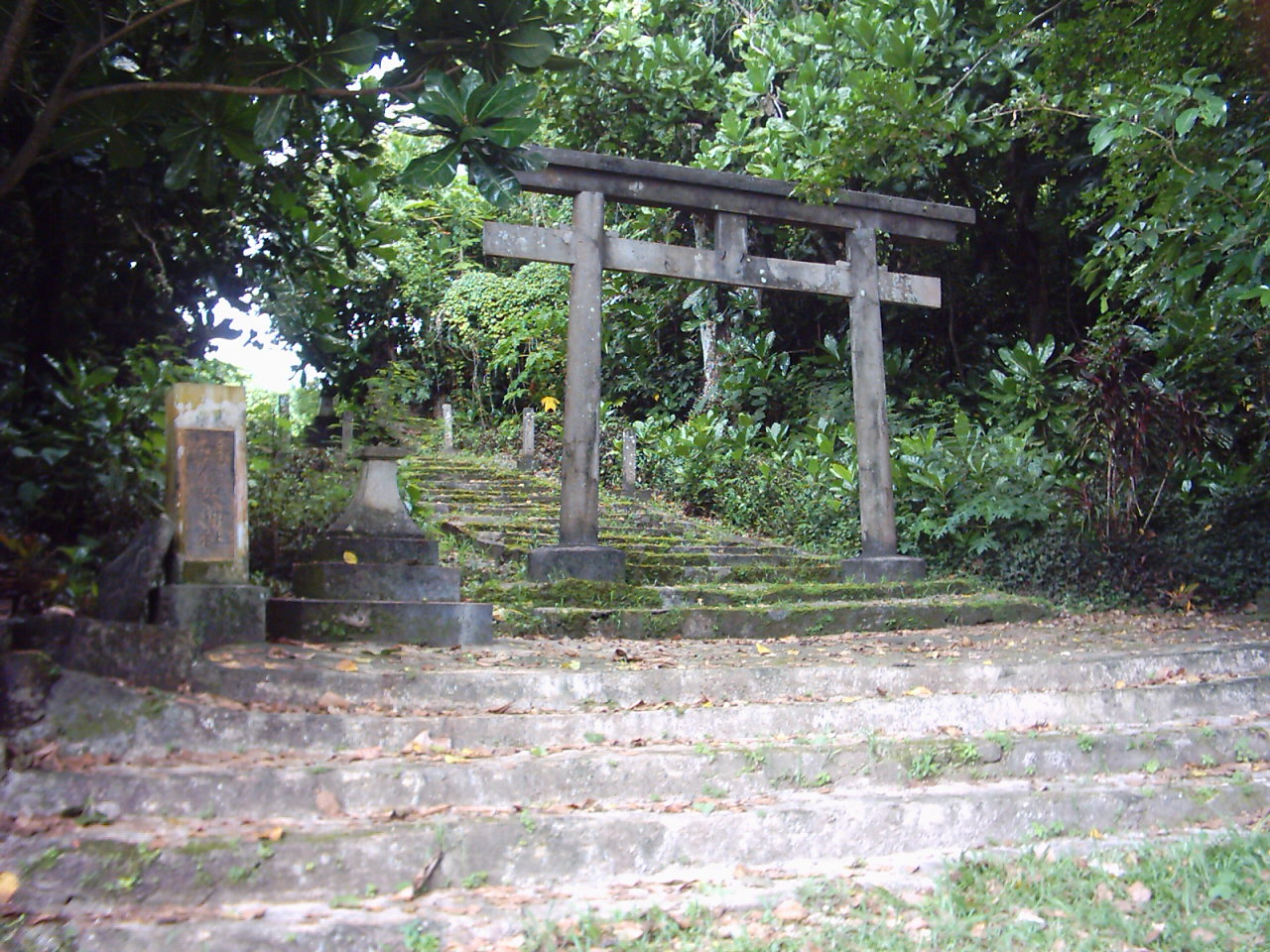
Tinian Shinto shrine.

In 1914, during World War I, the island was captured by Japan, which was awarded formal control in 1918 by the League of Nations as part of the South Seas Mandate. The island was settled by ethnic Japanese, Koreans, and Okinawans, who developed large-scale sugar plantations. Under Japanese rule, extensive infrastructure development occurred, including the construction of port facilities, waterworks, power stations, paved roads, and schools, along with entertainment facilities and Shinto shrines. Initial efforts to settle the island were met with difficulties, including an infestation of scale insects, followed by a severe drought in 1919. Efforts were resumed under the aegis of the Nan'yō Kōhatsu kabushiki gaisha in 1926, with new settlers from Okinawa as well as Fukushima and Yamagata Prefectures, and the introduction of coffee and cotton as cash crops in addition to sugar, and the construction of a Katsuobushi processing plant. By June 1944, some 15,700 Japanese civilians resided on Tinian (including 2,700 ethnic Koreans and 22 ethnic Chamorro).

In the Japanese area, thousands of colonists arrived, and it was used for agriculture and military purposes.

=== World War II ===
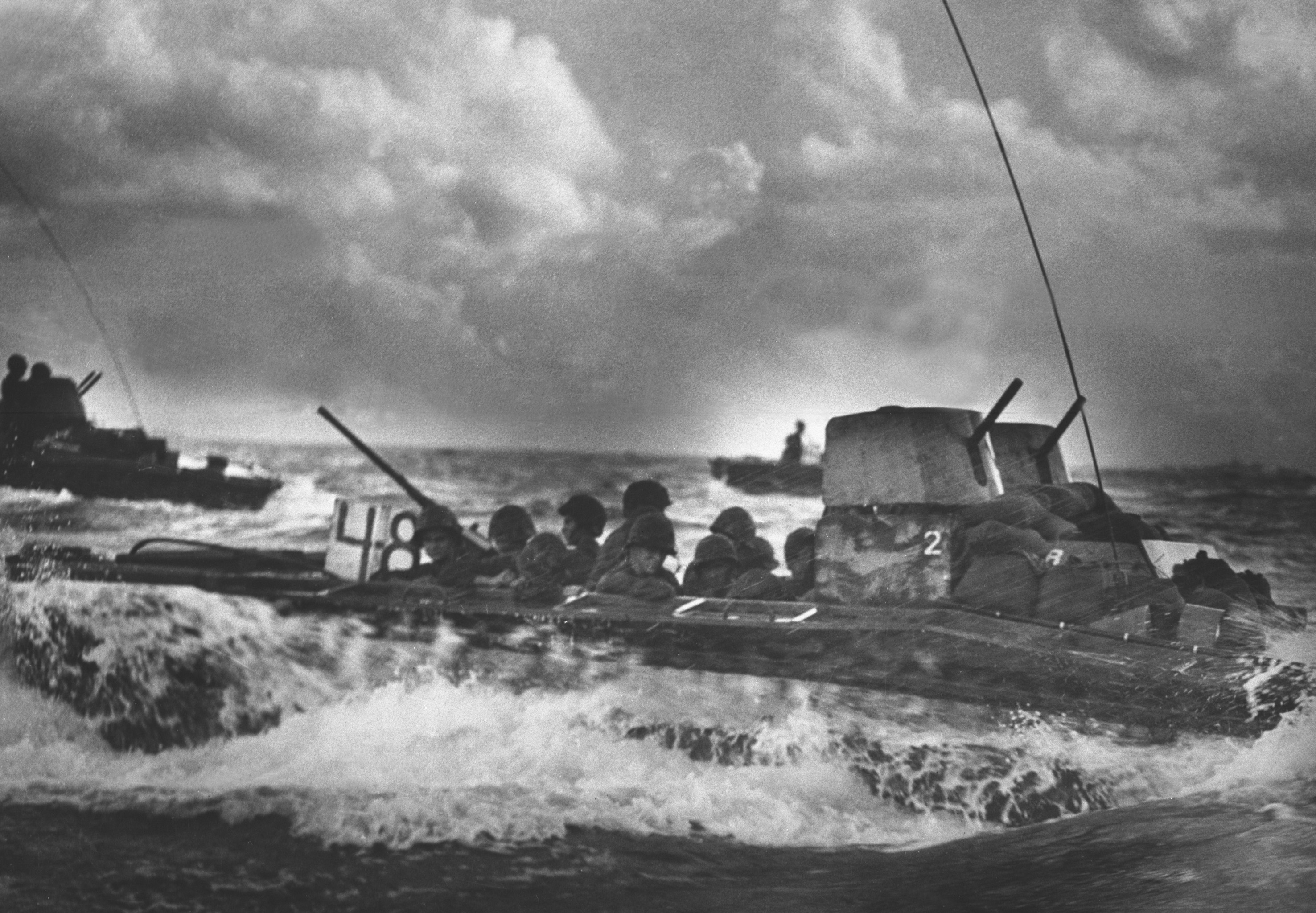
U.S. Marines during the Battle of Tinian in 1944.

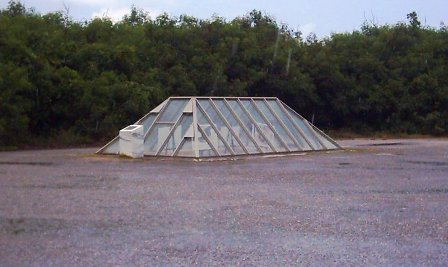
The atom bomb pit "No.1" on Tinian's North Field, where Little Boy was loaded aboard the Enola Gay.

The Japanese military did not garrison Tinian until the latter stages of World War II when the Japanese realized its strategic importance as a possible base for American Boeing B-29 Superfortress bombers. The island was seized by the Allies during the Battle of Tinian from July 24 to August 1, 1944. Of the 8,500-man Japanese garrison, 313 survived the battle. At the time, there were an estimated 15,700 Japanese civilians (including 2,700 ethnic Koreans) on the island. Many hundreds were also killed in the crossfire, took their own lives, or were executed by the Japanese military to avoid capture by the Americans.

Tinian is approximately 1,500 miles (2,400 kilometres) from mainland Japan and was suitable as a staging base for continuous heavy bomber attacks on the Japanese Islands. Immediately after the island's seizure by the US, construction began on the largest airbase of WWII, which covered the entire island (except its three highland areas). The Tinian Naval Base was a 40,000-personnel installation. The Navy Seabees (110th NCB) laid out the base in a pattern of city streets resembling New York City's Manhattan Island and named the streets accordingly.

The former Japanese town of Sunharon was nicknamed "The Village" because its location corresponded to that of Greenwich Village. A large square area between West and North Fields, used primarily for the location of the base hospitals and otherwise left undeveloped, was called Central Park. Some of the roads named from NYC include Broadway, 42nd Street, Lenox Avenue, Riverside Drive, and Eighth Avenue.

Two runway complexes, West Field and North Field, having a combined total of six 8,500-foot (2,600-meter) runways, were constructed. Today, the four runways at North Field are overgrown and abandoned. A five-year, $409-million contract was awarded in 2024 to upgrade the North Field. One of the two West Field runways remains in use as part of Tinian International Airport.

==== West Field ====
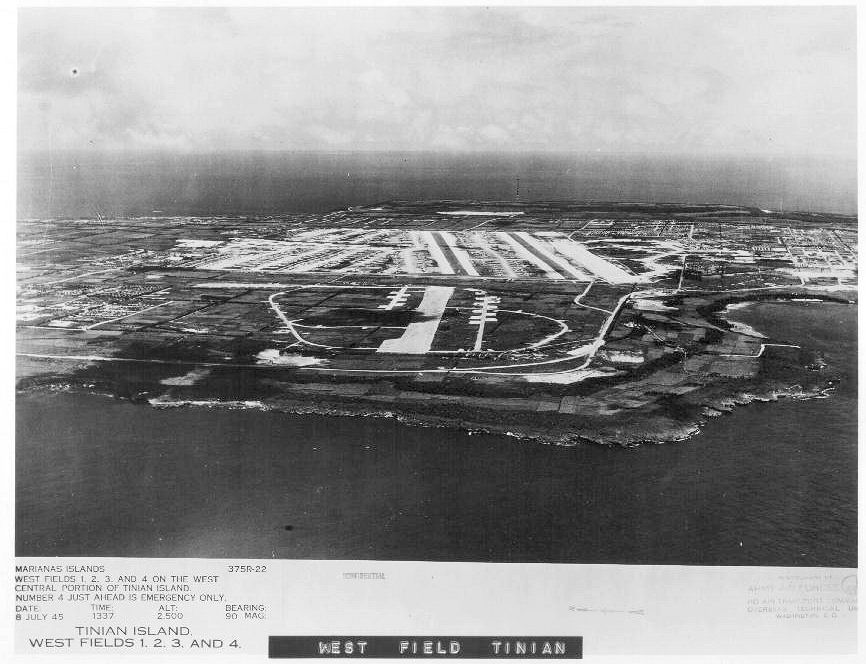
West Field, Tinian, July 8, 1945

The Japanese built an airfield with two parallel runways. The Americans repaired it and then called it West Field. From here, seven squadrons of the 58th Bombardment Wing flew combat and reconnaissance missions throughout Southeast Asia and finally into the Japanese home islands, the latter as part of the bombing of Japan.

After World War II, West Field was Tinian's airport, called Gurguan Point Airfield, and today is Tinian International Airport.

==== North Field ====
The Japanese had constructed three small fighter strips on Tinian, but none were suitable for bomber operations. Under the Americans, nearly the entire northern end of the island was occupied by the runways, almost 11 miles (18 km) of taxiways, and the airfield area, designed to accommodate the entire 313th Bombardment Wing complement of Boeing B-29 Superfortress bombers.

North Field was the departure point of the 509th Composite Group specialized Silverplate nuclear weapons delivery B-29 bombers Enola Gay and Bockscar, which respectively carried the two atomic bombs named Little Boy and Fat Man that were dropped on Hiroshima and Nagasaki.

Remains of the US bomber base and Atom Bomb Pits, as well as the remains of Japanese fortifications, are located at North Field. A memorial on the old airfield at the loading pits is roofed with glazed panels in metal framing for safer viewing. Both pits were reopened in conjunction with the 60th Anniversary Commemoration of the Battles of Saipan and Tinian. The pits were originally constructed to load the bombs since they were too large to be loaded conventionally. The B-29s were maneuvered over a pit with their bomb bay doors open to facilitate loading.

=== Postwar Tinian ===
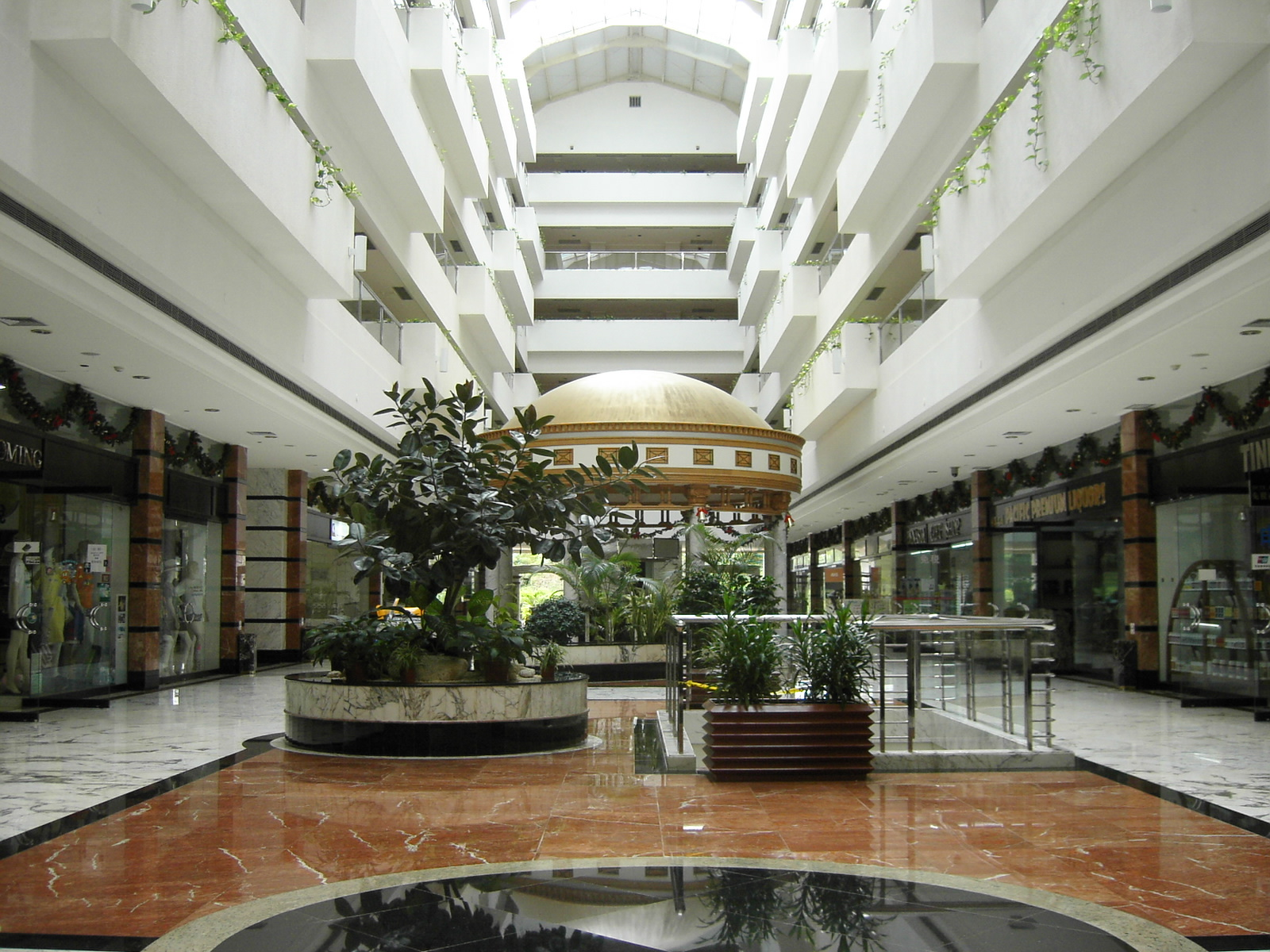
Tinian Dynasty Hotel lobby in 2011, it operated from 1998 to 2015

After the end of World War II, Tinian became part of the Trust Territory of the Pacific Islands, controlled by the United States. The island continued to be dominated by the United States military and was administered as a sub-district of Saipan until 1962. Since 1978, it has been a municipality of the Commonwealth of the Northern Mariana Islands.

During the 1980s, one of the runways on North Field was kept active to allow US Air Force C-130s to take off and land in support of U.S. Marine Corps training exercises in the island's north end. The two northern airstrips, Alpha and Bravo, were cleared of vegetation, and the limestone coral that had been disturbed by roots was excavated and replaced by Marines of the 9th Engineer Support Battalion, 3rd FSSG, 3rd Marine Division then stationed at Camp Hansen, Okinawa in late 1981. That unit had been transported by sea aboard the USS Cayuga (LST-1186). The military presence began to be replaced by tourism in the 1990s, though it still plays an important role in the local economy.

On November 4, 1986, the Northern Marianas, including Tinian, became a part of the United States, and the people there became U.S. citizens.

Primary business on the island in the postwar period included fishing, cattle, and tourism. In the 1990s, an ill-fated attempt at operating casinos began. There are still many ranches and some 1–2 thousand cattle on Tinian.

=== 21st century ===
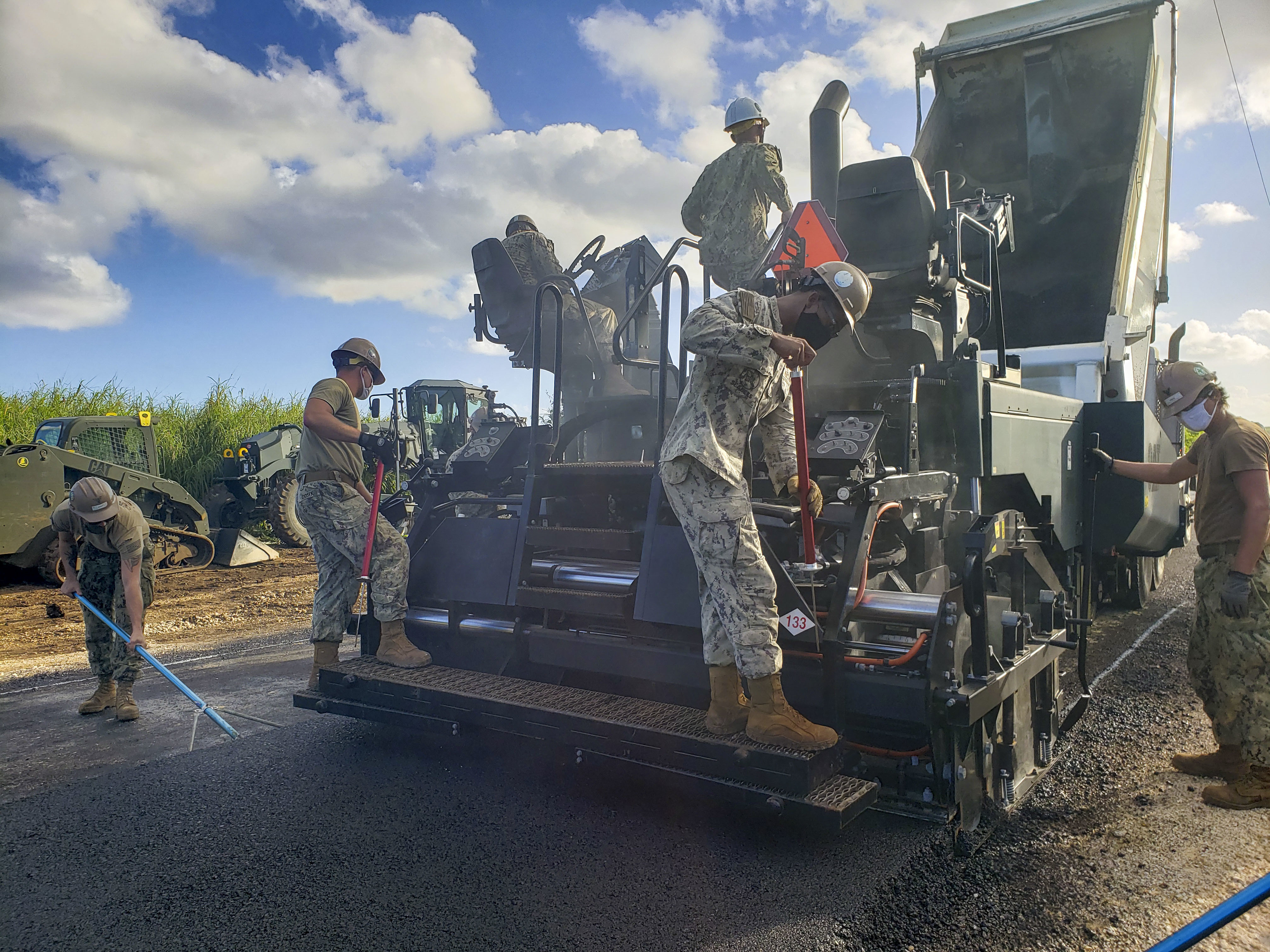
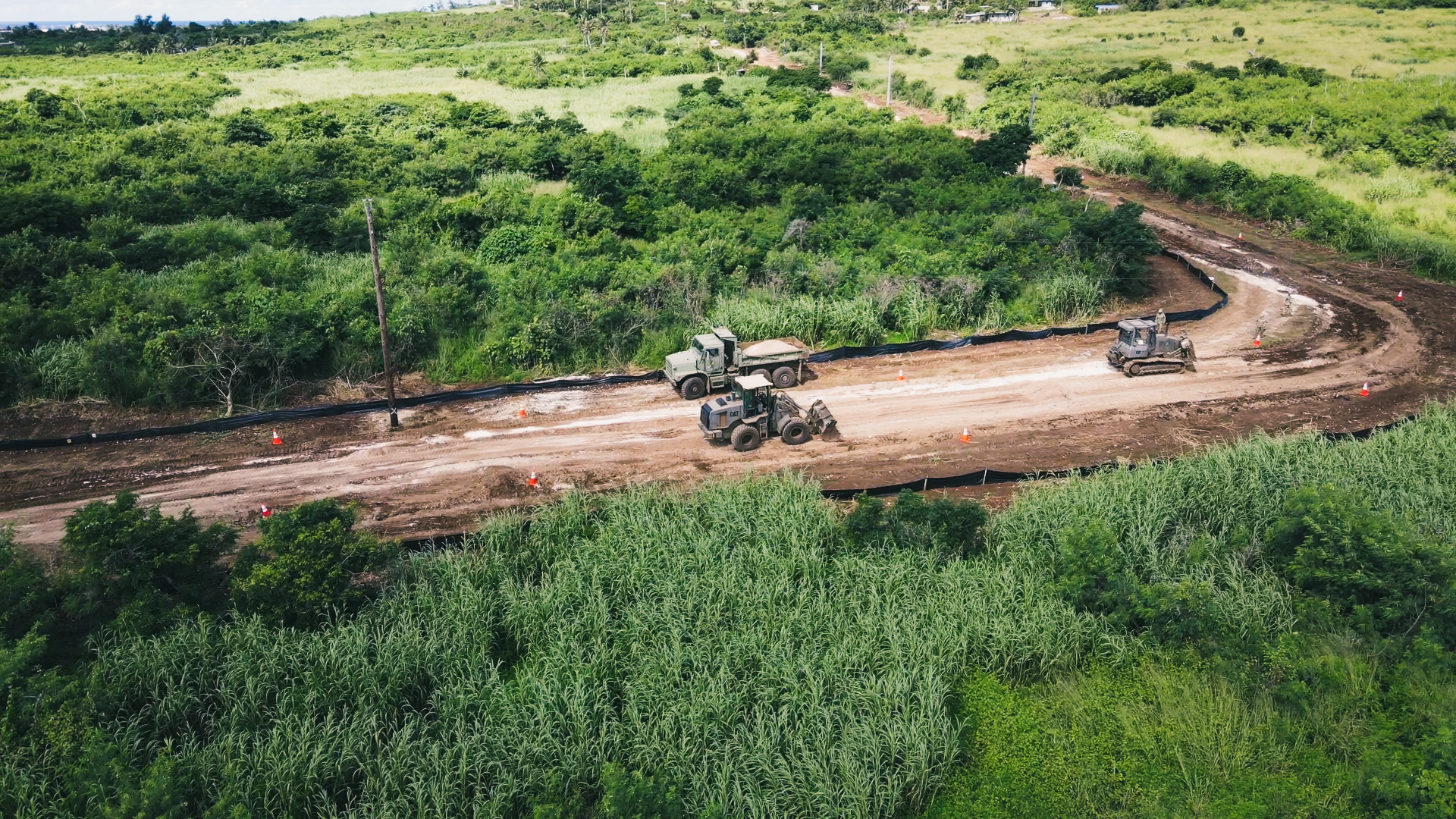
US Navy Seabees construct a road on Tinian in 2020

In 2009, Star Marianas Air, based in Tinian, was founded, and by the 2010s, small aircraft operated routes between Saipan, Guam, Tinian, and Rota, for example. By 2016, the airline had a fleet consisting of five Piper Super-Chieftains and six Piper Cherokee Sixes.

The Tinian Dynasty Hotel and Casino shut down in 2016, with the company blaming Typhoon Soudelor for a decrease in visitors. The Hong Kong-based company that operated what was the only casino on Tinian had its gambling license revoked and was going bankrupt.

On October 24, 2018, Typhoon Yutu made landfall on the island of Tinian as a Category 5-equivalent super typhoon, becoming the most powerful storm on record to hit the Northern Mariana Islands and causing an extensive amount of damage.

A new casino, called Tinian Diamond Casino, was in the final stages of completion by 2022 and was working to reestablish a ferry between Tinian and nearby Saipan. However, it never opened.

==== Revival of U.S. military base on Tinian ====
In late 2023, it was reported that the U.S. House of Representatives and Senate approved $79 million for Tinian's Divert Airfield in the National Defense Authorization Act for Fiscal Year 2024.

In 2024, the U.S. Air Force awarded a $409 million contract to Fluor Corporation, a construction company in Texas, to restore the island's former airfield. The re-militarization of the island caused concern for local residents, who fear rising geopolitical tensions between the US and China could make Tinian a target in the event of a conflict over Taiwan.

"Sometimes there's very little oversight of what the military does because the community is not involved. It tends to take place at the agency level," said cultural anthropologist Isa Arriola, who is also a Northern Mariana Islander.

It was reported at a hearing on Tinian, residents pointed out that the U.S. military's amphibious landings would could cut off access to a popular fishing area. In response to the concern, a U.S. Navy representative assured the community that the military would “relocate” the fishing ground's natural resources to another beach.

In addition to North Field, a second alternative airfield for Andersen Air Force Base is under construction on Tinian. Located on the north side of the civilian Tinian Airport, the first phase of work on Tinian Divert Airfield was scheduled to be completed by October 2025.The Tinian Divert Airfield is a U.S. Air Force project to create a secondary landing site on Tinian Island in the Pacific, designed to support agile combat employment (ACE) and serve as a backup to the primary Anderson Air Force Base on Guam. Guam and Tinian are part of a north–south defensive line known as the Second Island Chain under America's containment strategy.

== Municipality ==
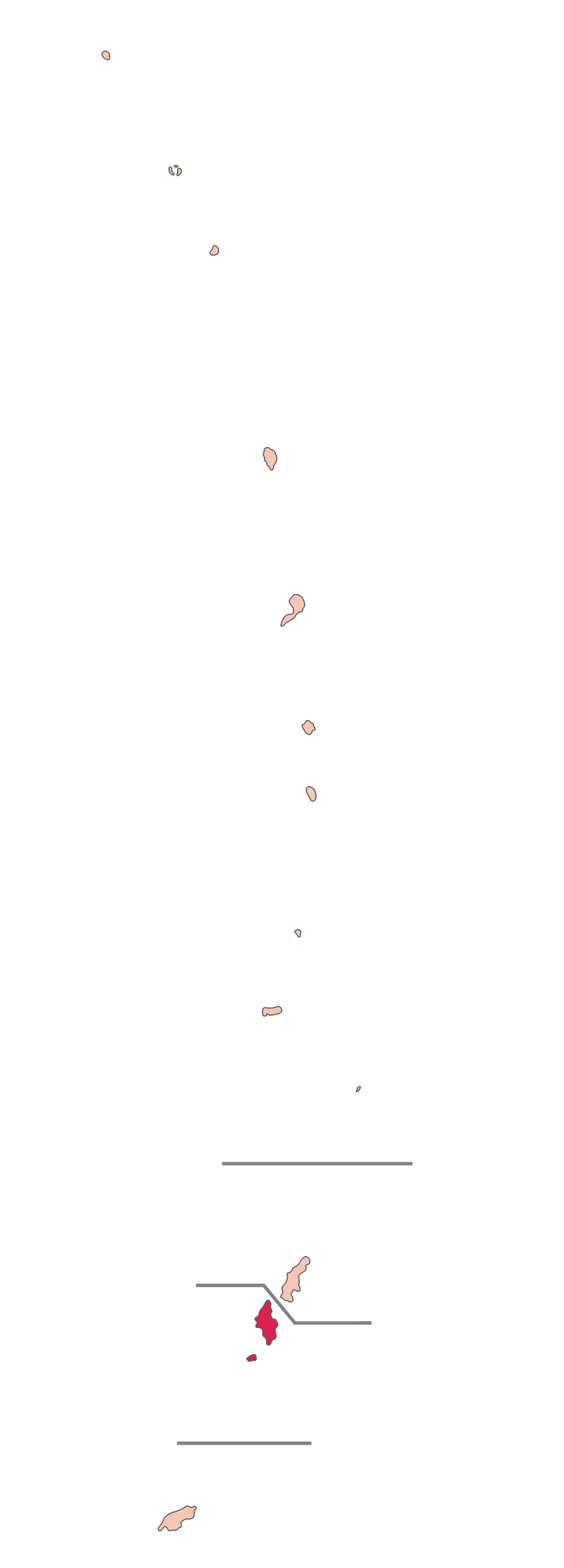
Map of the four municipalities of CNMI, with Tinian Municipality highlighted in red.

Tinian Municipality is one of the four constituent municipalities of the Northern Mariana Islands. It consists of Tinian and Aguijan islands and their offshore islets. The municipality is the second southernmost in the Northern Marianas and has a land area of 108.1 km^{2} (41.7 sq mi). The population of the 2000 census was 3,540 persons, all living on the island of Tinian (Aguijan is uninhabited). The municipal seat and main village of the island of Tinian is San Jose, situated on the southwest coast.

== Geography ==
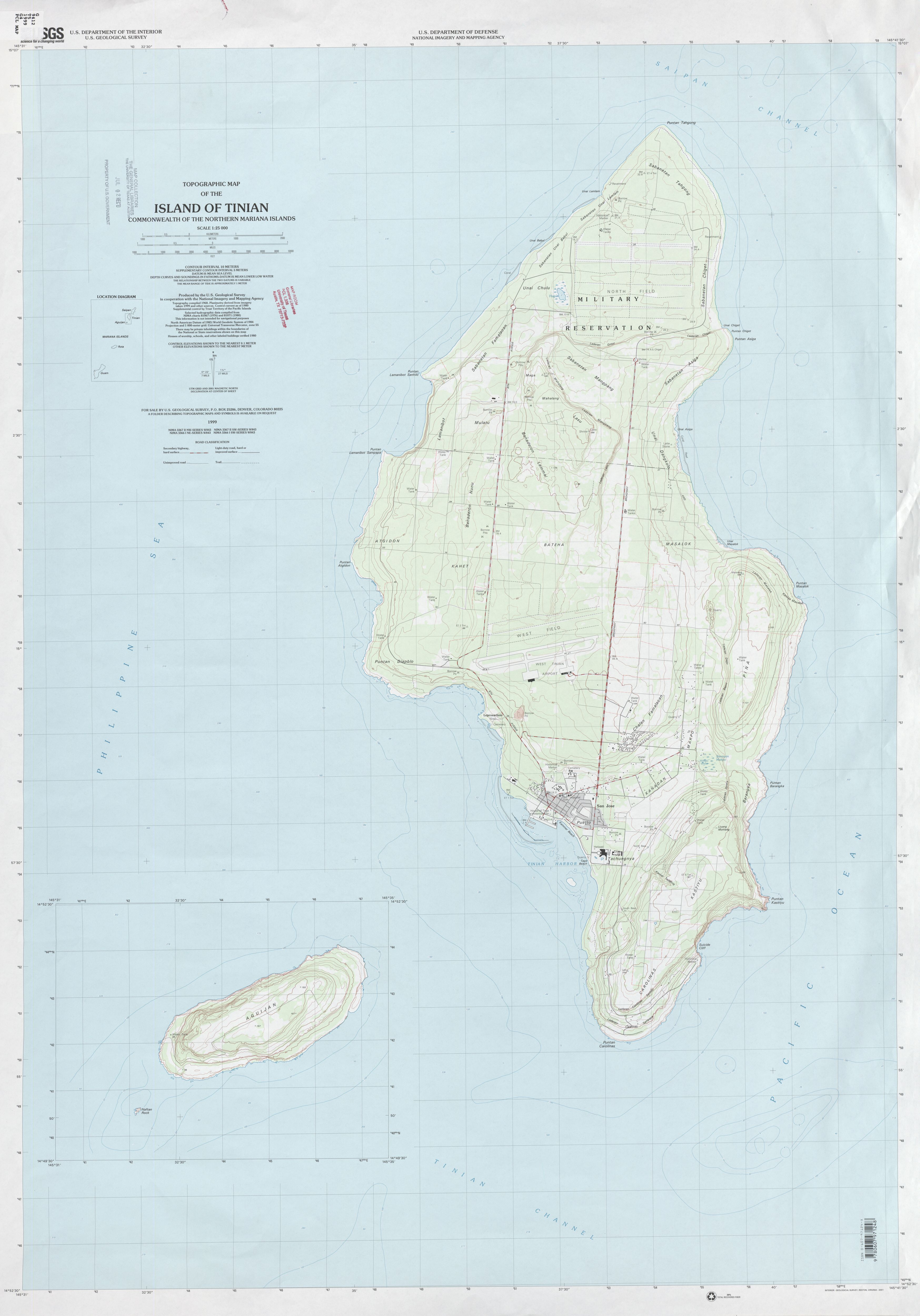
Topographic map of the island of Tinian, showing buildings as of 1999.

Tinian is about 5 nautical miles (9.3 km) southwest of Saipan, from which it is separated by the Saipan Channel. It has a land area of 39 square miles (100 km^{2}), with its highest elevation on the Kastiyu plateau at 187 meters (614 ft). It is considerably flatter than Saipan. The island has limestone cliffs and caves. There is a variety of marine life and coral reefs surrounding the island. Its clear, warm waters are ideal for snorkeling, scuba diving, and sport fishing.

Aguijan Island, a small island, lies to the south, and Tatsumi Bank, a fishing forum, lies to the southeast.

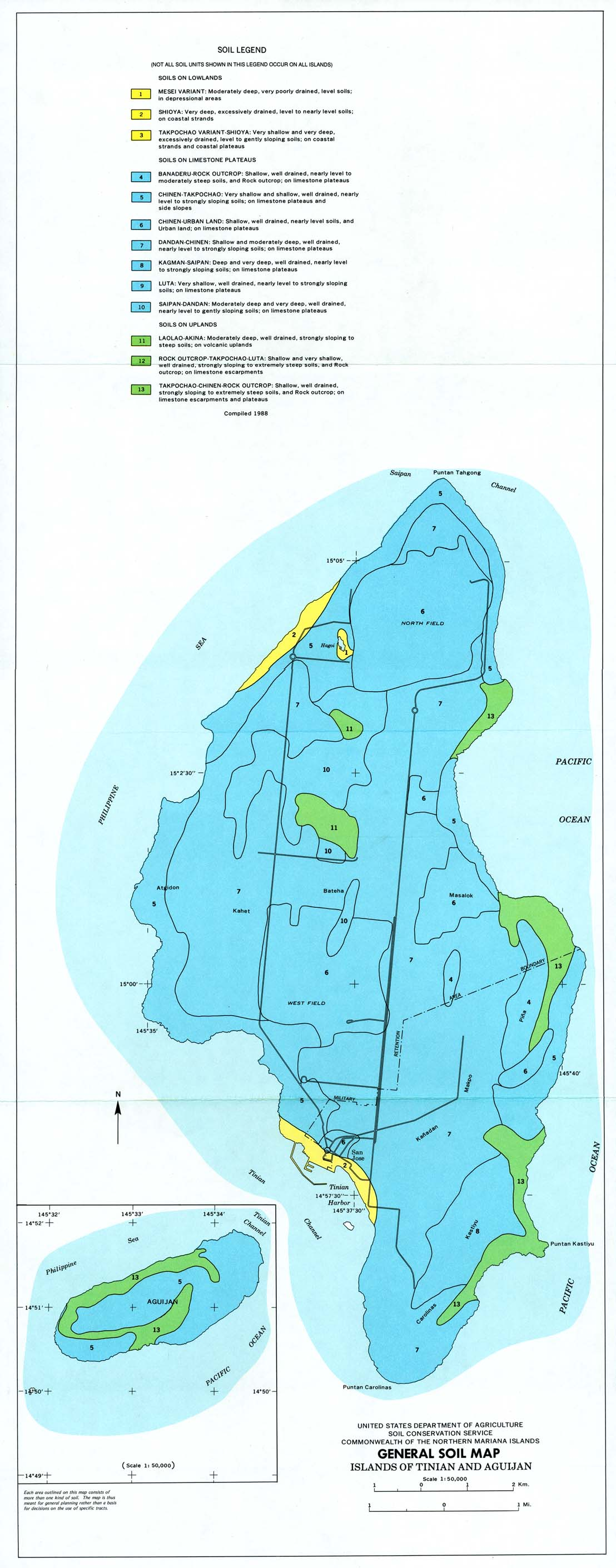
Map of soil types on the islands of Tinian and Aguijan

== Plant, wildlife, and marine life ==
There is a variety of flora and fauna; the Tinian monarch is the island's only endemic bird species and is threatened by habitat loss. The island has been recognised as an Important Bird Area (IBA) by BirdLife International because it supports populations of Micronesian megapodes, white-throated ground doves, Mariana fruit doves, Micronesian myzomelas, rufous fantails, Saipan white-eyes and Micronesian starlings.

Surveys of bird populations in 1982, 1996, and 2008 have found that the bird population, including native birds, is stable. Examples of native bird species on Tinian include Mariana Fruit-Dove (Ptilinopusroseicapilla), Micronesian Honeyeater (Myzomela rubratra), and Tinian Monarch (Monarcha takatsukasae).

== Population ==
The population of Tinian was 2,044 (as of 2020), which corresponds to less than 5% of all residents of the Northern Mariana Islands and a population density of 20 people per km^{2}. Most of the inhabitants are Chamorros (about 75%) and members of various other groups of islands in the Caroline Islands. There are also minorities of Filipino, Bangladeshi, East Asian, and European-descended people.

Tinians are United States citizens.

== Economy ==
Much of the local economy of Tinian is dependent on tourism. However, tourist infrastructure is relatively poorly developed. The village of San Jose has several smaller hotels, restaurants, and bars. Agriculture is primarily on the subsistence level. The largest employers on the island are the government and the casino, which was legalized in 1989. The 2010 census showed a population of 3,136 for the island.

== Transportation ==
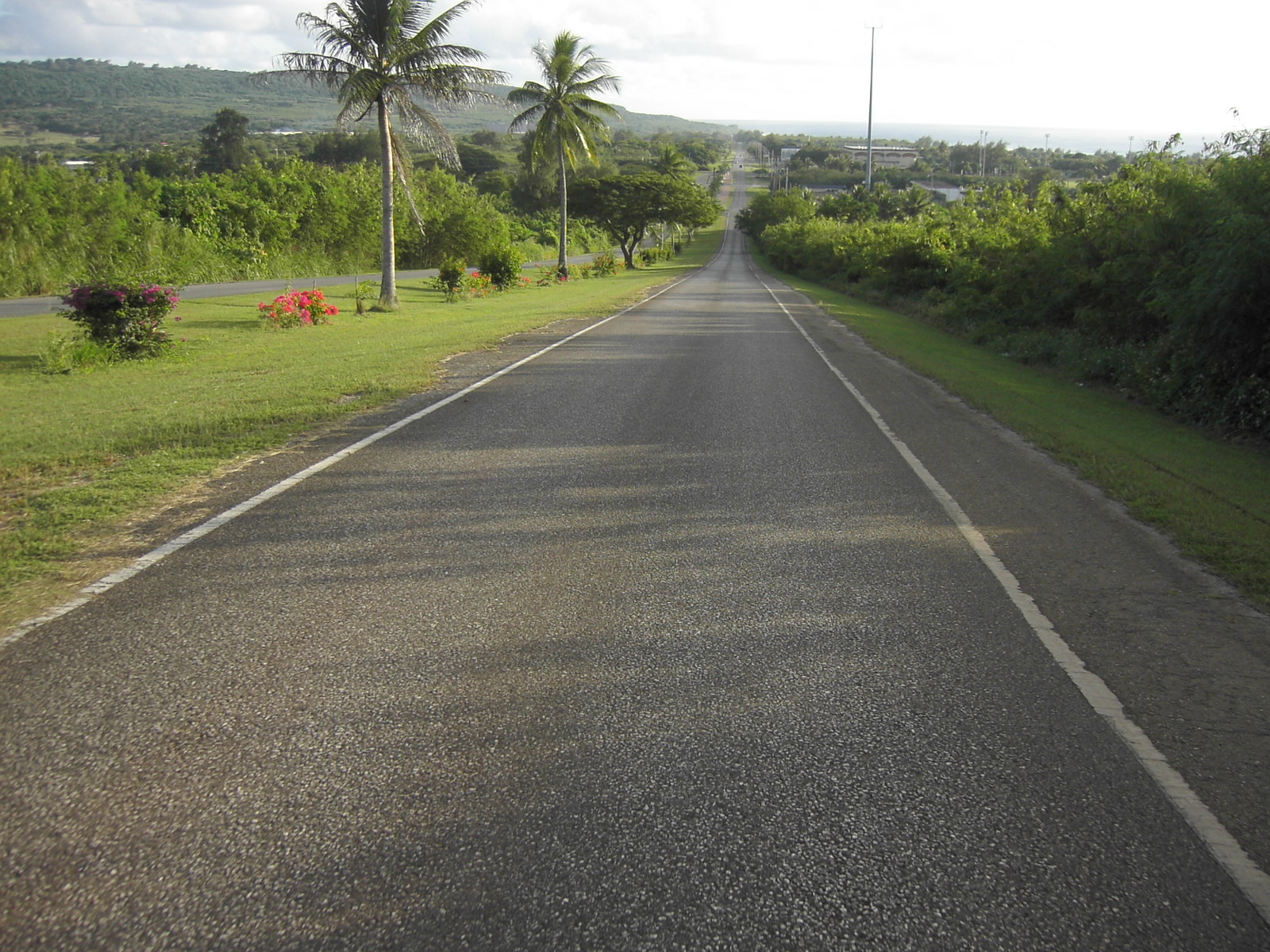
A road on Tinian

=== Air ===
Tinian Airport (TIQ) is small and serviced by Star Marianas Air, which operates daily scheduled flights to Saipan. Freedom Air, which had served the island, filed for bankruptcy in October 2013 and suspended all operations in March 2014.

=== Ferry ===
The ferry boat service that operated twice daily between Tinian and Saipan ran at a loss estimated to be US$1 million a year and has since ceased.

== Government ==
The local government is the Municipality of Tinian and Aguiguan, which also includes the uninhabited island Aguijan. The municipality has a land area of 108.1 km^{2} (41.7 sq mi). The population of the 2000 census was 3,540. The municipal seat and main village of the island of Tinian is San Jose, on the southwest coast. Mayor Edwin P. Aldan was inaugurated in January 2019, succeeding Joey San Nicolas.

== Local attractions ==
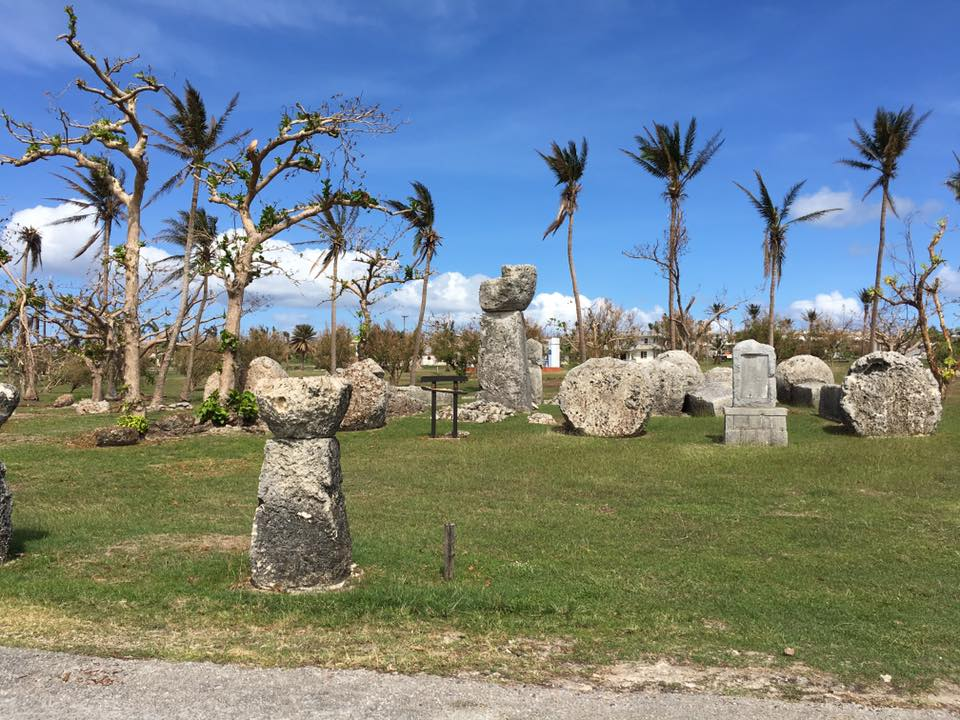
The ruins of the House of Taga stones

=== House of Taga ===
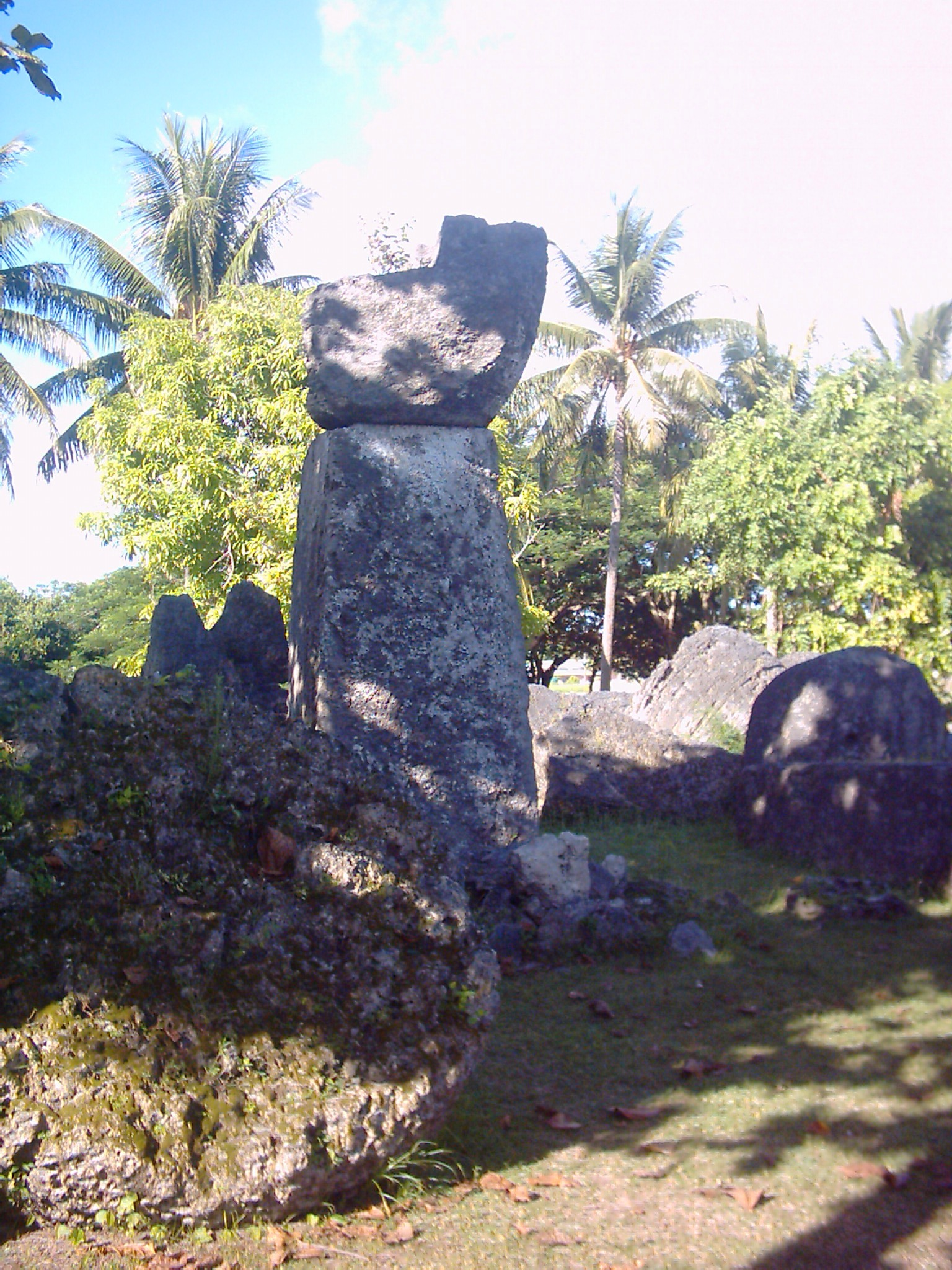
House of Taga, Tinian

The House of Taga is a latte stone site, one of the most significant structures in the Marianas. The stones are quarried limestone, each approximately 20 feet (6.1 m) in length. Of the twelve large Latte structures, only one is still standing. The site is one of seven locations on Tinian on the National Register of Historic Places listings in the Northern Mariana Islands.

=== Beaches ===
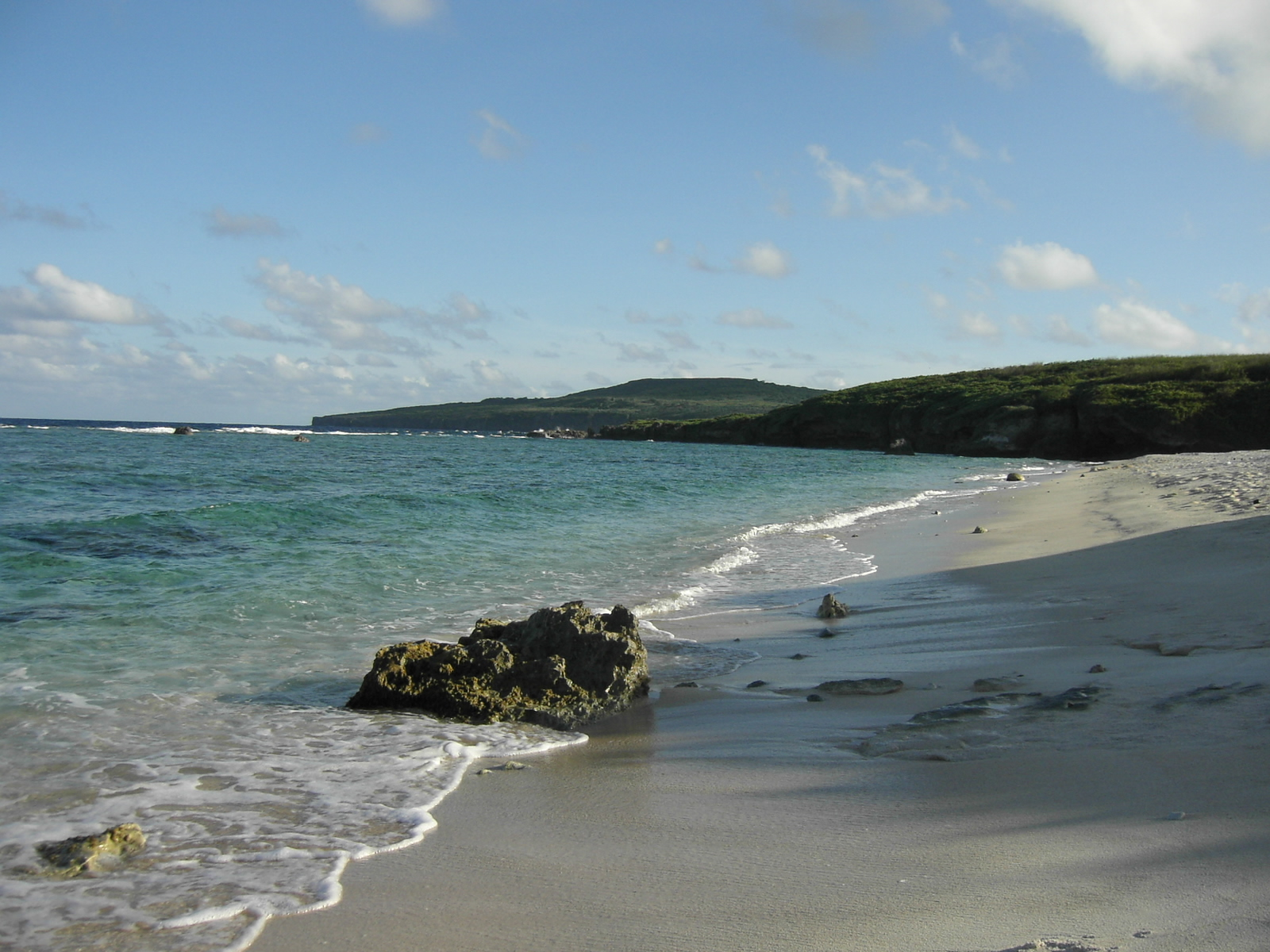
Tinian beach

Major Beaches on Tinian include:

- Tachogna, near Taga beach
- Taga Beach is popular, with a small cliff where you can jump into the water.
- Chaga, a small beach in the NW of Tinian
- Unai Dankulu or Long Beach, actually a series of beaches on the North East

In 2022, Chiget Beach was reopened for use after being cleared. The issue was unexploded ordnance on the beach.

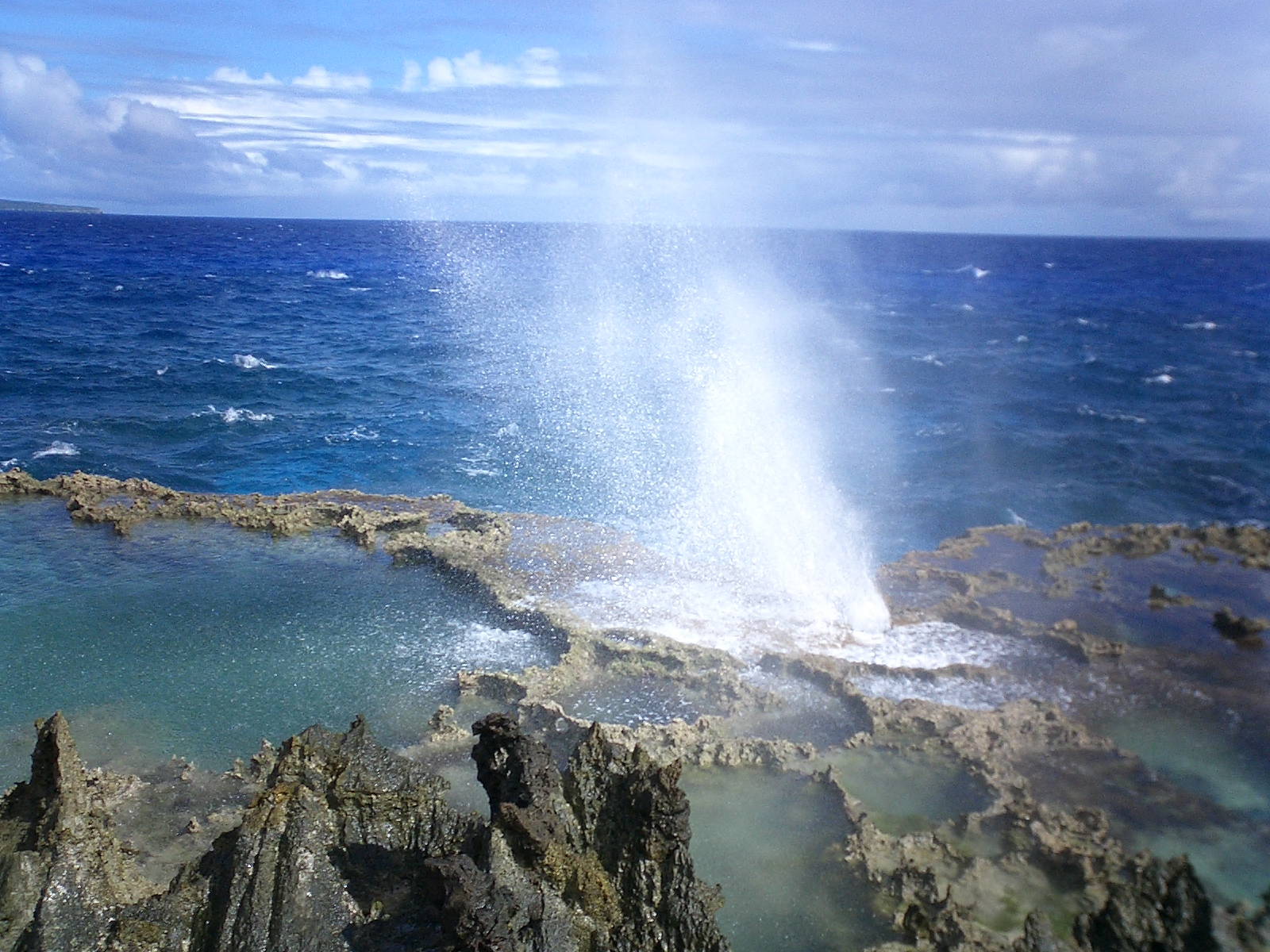
Tinian Blowhole, a natural blowhole on the coast

One of the natural wonders is a blowhole, in which water gets shot up 10 meters. Snorkeling and scuba diving is a popular tourist activity in Tinian.

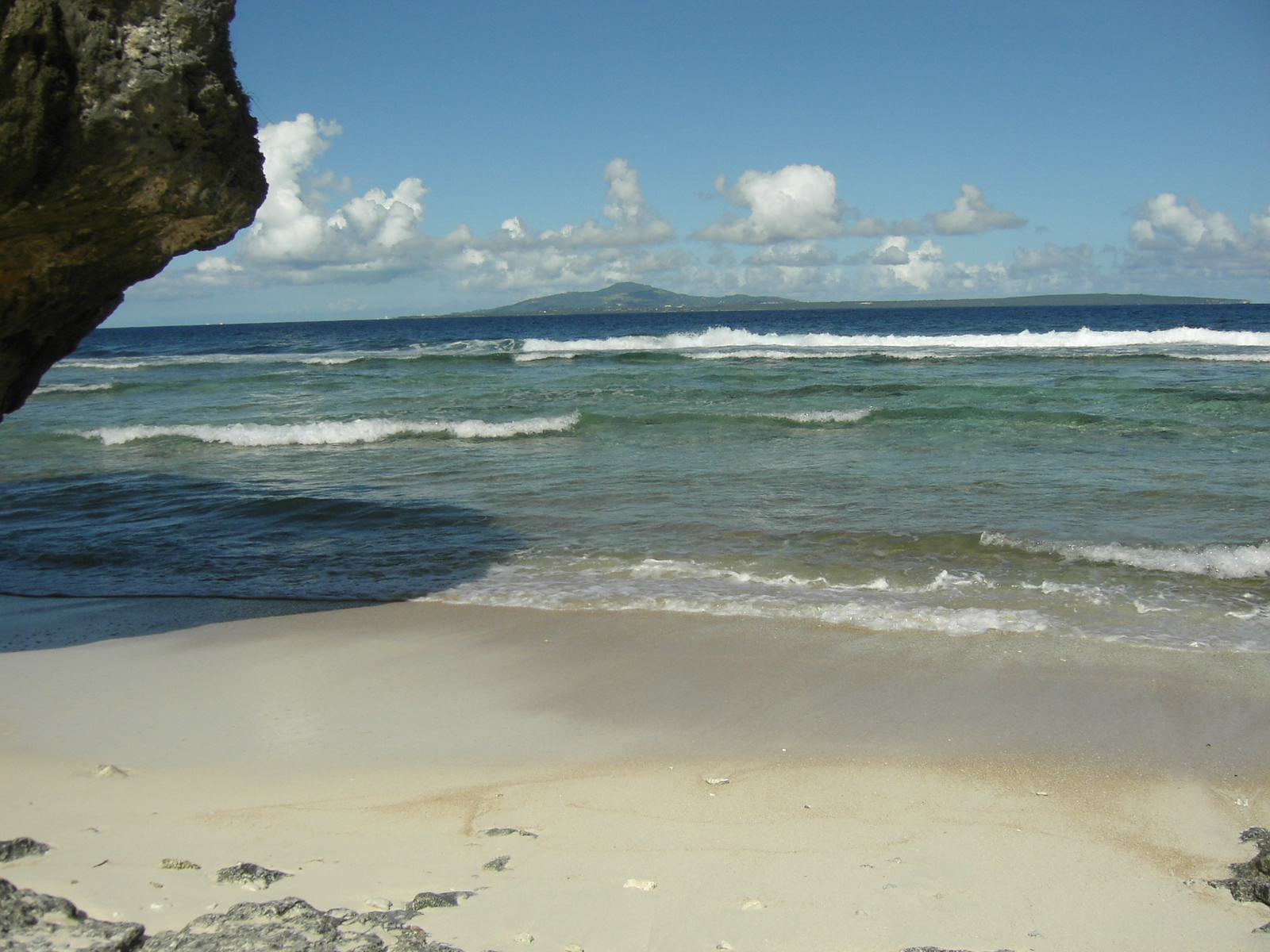
Masalok Beach on Tinian

== Education ==
Commonwealth of the Northern Mariana Islands Public School System operates public schools including Tinian Elementary School, and Tinian Jr./Sr. High School.

State Library of the Commonwealth of the Northern Mariana Islands operates the Tinian Public Library in San Jose Village.

== Notable people ==
- Kimberlyn King-Hinds (born 1975), delegate to the U.S. House of Representatives for the Northern Mariana Islands
