= Attorney General of the Northern Mariana Islands =

Attorney General of the Commonwealth of the Northern Mariana Islands

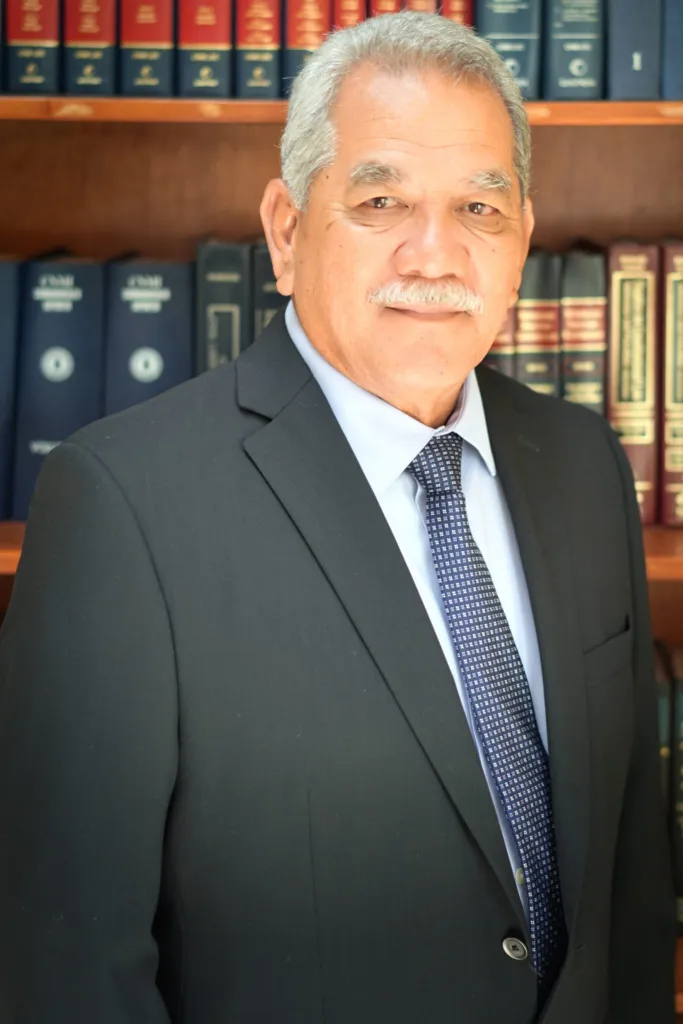
- Incumbent; Edward Manibusan since January 12, 2015
- Inaugural holder: Michael D'Angelo
- Website: Official website

The Office of the Attorney General of the Northern Mariana Islands (Chamorro: Abugådu Heneråt; Carolinian: Sóulemil Allégh) provides "legal counsel and representation to the...government and its agencies in many issues vital to the people’s interest. These issues include the protection of children from abuse and neglect, preservation of the environment, protecting the Commonwealth’s financial assets, the protection of consumers, and public safety." The office has the following divisions:

- Administrative Services
- Child Support Enforcement
- Civil Division
- Consumer Protection
- Criminal Division
- Investigative Division
- Solicitor’s Division

== List of attorneys general (1978–present) ==
Image	Name	Term of service
	Michael D'Angelo	1978
	(+) James E. Sinding	1979–1981
	Peter Van Name Esser	1982–1983
	(+) Rexford C. Kosack	1983–1986
	Alexandro C. Castro	1986–1989
	Edward E. Manibusan	1989–1990
	Robert C. Naraja	1990–1994
	(+) Richard Weil	1994–1995
	(+) Loren A. Sutton	1995 (acting)
	Cizo Sebastian Aloot	1995–1996 (acting)
	Robert B. Dunlap	1996–1998 (acting)
	Sally B. Pfund	1998 (acting)
	(+) Maya B. Kara	1998–2000 (acting)
	(+) Herbert D. Soll	2000–2002
	Robert T. Torres	2002
	Ramona Villagomez Manglona	2002–2003
	Pamela S. Brown	2003–2005
	Matthew T. Gregory	2006–2008
	Gregory V. Baka	2008–2009 (acting)
	Edward T. Buckingham, III	2009–2012
	Ellsbeth Viola Alepuyo	2012 (acting)
	Joey P. San Nicolas	2012–2014
	Gilbert J. Birnbrich	2014–2015
	Edward Manibusan	2015–present

+ Deceased
Persons who served as Acting Attorney General for less than 30 days total, or during the term of a Senate-confirmed or elected AG, are omitted.

== See also ==
- Politics of the Northern Mariana Islands
