= U.S. state and local government responses to the COVID-19 pandemic =

States, territories, and counties that issued a stay-at-home order in 2020. Came into effect before March 22, 2020 Came into effect before March 29, 2020 Came into effect before April 5, 2020 Came into effect before April 12, 2020 No order ever issued Full map including municipalities

State, territorial, tribal, and local governments responded to the COVID-19 pandemic in the United States with various declarations of emergency, closure of schools and public meeting places, lockdowns, and other restrictions intended to slow the progression of the virus.

Multiple groups of states formed compacts in an attempt to coordinate some of their responses. On the West coast: California, Oregon, and Washington state; in the Northeast: Massachusetts, New York, New Jersey, Connecticut, Delaware, Pennsylvania, and Rhode Island; and in the Midwest: Michigan, Ohio, Wisconsin, Minnesota, Illinois, Indiana, and Kentucky.

There was a link between public health outcomes and partisanship between states. At the beginning of the pandemic to early June 2020, Democratic-led states had higher case rates than Republican-led states, while in the second half of 2020, Republican-led states saw higher case and death rates than states led by Democrats. As of mid-2021, states with tougher policies generally had fewer COVID cases and deaths {needs update}. Thousands of US counties also initiated their own policy responses to the pandemic, resulting in significant variability even within states.

== State-level regulations ==
=== Initial pandemic responses, including full lockdowns ===
This is a list of regulations that were imposed at the state level, restricting activities and closing facilities as a result of the pandemic. Many counties and municipal jurisdictions have imposed more stringent regulations. A Columbia University model estimated 54,000 deaths would have been prevented if states had enacted restrictions starting a few weeks earlier, on March 1.

State/territory	State of emergency declared	Stay at home ordered	Stay at home order lifted	Face coverings required in public	Gatherings banned	Out-of-state travel restrictions	Closures ordered				Sources
State/territory	State of emergency declared	Stay at home ordered	Stay at home order lifted	Face coverings required in public	Gatherings banned	Out-of-state travel restrictions	Schools	Daycares	Bars & sit-down restaurants	Non-essential retail	Sources
Alabama	March 13	April 4	April 30	No	10 or more	No	Yes (remainder of term)	Yes	Yes	Yes	
Alaska	March 11	March 28	April 21	No	10 or more	Mandatory quarantine	Yes (remainder of term)	Yes	Yes	Yes	
American Samoa	January 29	No	N/a	No	10 or more	Travel suspended	Yes (remainder of term)	Yes	No	No	
Arizona	March 11	March 31	May 15	No	50 or more	Limited quarantine	Yes (remainder of term)	Yes	Yes	Yes	
Arkansas	March 11	No	N/a	Yes	10 or more	No	Yes (remainder of term)	Yes	Yes	Regional	
California (government response)	March 4	March 19	January 25	Yes	All	No	Yes (remainder of term)	Yes	Yes	Yes	
Colorado	March 10	March 26	May 8	Yes	10 or more	No	Yes (remainder of term)	Restricted	Yes	Yes	
Connecticut	March 10	March 23	May 20	Yes	All	Recommended quarantine	Yes (remainder of term)	Yes	Yes	Yes	
Delaware	March 12	March 24	May 15	Yes	All	Mandatory quarantine	Yes (remainder of term)	Yes	Yes	Yes	
(Washington, D.C.) District of Columbia	March 11	March 30	May 29	Yes	10 or more	No	Yes (remainder of term)	Yes	Yes	Yes	
Florida	March 1	April 3	April 30	No	10 or more	Limited quarantine / Screened	Yes (remainder of term)	Yes	Yes	Yes	
(Georgia (U.S. state)) Georgia	March 14	April 3	April 30	No	10 or more	No	Yes (remainder of term)	No	Yes	Yes	
Guam	March 14	No	N/a	No	All	No	Yes (remainder of term)	Yes	Yes	Yes	
Hawaii	March 4	March 25	May 31	Yes	11 or more, and public gathering in public places	Mandatory quarantine	Yes (remainder of term)	Yes	Yes	Yes	
Idaho	March 13	March 25	April 30	No	All	Mandatory quarantine	Yes (remainder of term)	Yes	Yes	Restricted	
Illinois	March 9	March 21	May 30	Yes	All	No	Yes (remainder of term)	Yes	Yes	Yes	
Indiana	March 6	March 25	May 1	Yes	All outside, and 11 or more inside a household	No	Yes (remainder of term)	Yes	Yes	Yes	
Iowa	March 9	No	N/a	No	10 or more	No	Yes (remainder of term)	Yes	Yes	Yes	
Kansas	March 9	March 30	May 3	Yes	10 or more	Limited quarantine	Yes (remainder of term)	No	Yes	Yes	
Kentucky	March 6	March 26 (advisory)	No (advisory)	Yes	10 or more	Mandatory quarantine	Yes (remainder of term)	Yes	Yes	Yes	
Louisiana	March 11	March 23	May 14	Yes	11 or more	No	Yes (remainder of term)	Yes	Yes	Yes	
Maine	March 15	April 2	May 31	Yes	10 or more	Mandatory quarantine	Yes (remainder of term)	Yes	Yes	Restricted	
Maryland	March 5	March 30	May 15	Yes	10 or more	Mandatory quarantine	Yes (remainder of term)	Yes	Yes	Yes	
Massachusetts	March 10	March 24 (advisory)	May 18 (advisory)	Yes	11 or more	Mandatory quarantine	Yes (remainder of term)	Yes	Yes	Yes	
Michigan	March 11	March 24	June 5	Yes	All	No	Yes (remainder of term)	Yes	Yes	Yes	
Minnesota	March 13	March 27	May 4	Yes	All	No	Yes (remainder of term)	Yes	Yes	Yes	
Mississippi	March 4	April 3	May 11	No	All	No	Yes (remainder of term)	No	Yes	Yes	
Missouri	March 13	April 6	May 3	No	10 or more	Regional	Yes (remainder of term)	No	Yes	Yes	
Montana	March 12	March 28	April 24	No	10 or more	Mandatory quarantine	Yes (districts' choice)	Yes	Yes	Yes	
Nebraska	March 13	No	N/a	No	10 or more	Limited quarantine	Yes (remainder of term)	Restricted	Restricted	No	
Nevada	March 12	April 1	May 15	Yes	10 or more	Mandatory quarantine	Yes (remainder of term)	Yes	Yes	Yes	
New Hampshire	March 13	March 27	June 15	No	50 or more	Mandatory quarantine	Yes (remainder of term)	Yes	Yes	Yes	
New Jersey	March 9	March 21	June 9	Yes	All	No	Yes (remainder of term)	Yes	Yes	Yes	
New Mexico	March 11	March 24	May 15	Yes	6 or more	Mandatory quarantine	Yes (remainder of term)	Yes	Yes	Yes	
(New York (state)) New York (government response)	March 7	March 22	May 15	Yes	All	No	Yes (remainder of term)	Yes	Yes	Yes	
North Carolina	March 10	March 30	May 8	Yes	10 or more	No	Yes (remainder of term)	Yes	Yes	Yes	
North Dakota	March 13	No	N/a	No	50 or more	Mandatory quarantine	Yes (remainder of term)	Yes	Yes	Yes	
(Northern Mariana Islands) N. Mariana Islands	January 29	No	N/a	No	10 or more	No	Yes (remainder of term)	Yes	No	No	
Ohio	March 9	March 23	May 30	Yes	11 or more	Mandatory quarantine	Yes (remainder of term)	Restricted	Yes	Yes	
Oklahoma	March 15	April 2 (partial advisory)	N/a	No	11 or more	Limited quarantine	Yes (remainder of term)	Yes	Yes	Yes	
Oregon	March 8	March 23	June 19	Yes	All	No	Yes (remainder of term)	Yes	Yes	Restricted	
Pennsylvania	March 6	April 1	May 8	No	10 or more (recommended)	Limited quarantine	Yes (remainder of term)	Yes	Yes	Yes	
Puerto Rico	March 12	March 15	May 3	No	All	Screened	Yes (remainder of term)	Yes	Yes	Yes	
Rhode Island	March 9	March 28	May 8	Yes	25 or more	Mandatory quarantine	Yes (remainder of term)	Yes	Yes	Yes	
South Carolina	March 13	April 7	May 12	No	50 or more	Limited quarantine	Yes (remainder of term)	Yes	Yes	Yes	
South Dakota	March 13	Regional	N/a	No	50 or more	No	Yes (remainder of term)	Yes	No	No	
Tennessee	March 12	April 2	April 30	Varies by county	10 or more	No	Yes (remainder of term)	Yes	Yes	Yes	
Texas (government response)	March 13	April 2	April 30	Yes	10 or more	Limited quarantine	Yes (remainder of term)	Yes	Yes	Yes	
Utah	March 6	Regional	N/a	Yes	10 or more	No	Yes (remainder of term)	Yes	Yes	Regional	
(United States Virgin Islands) U.S. Virgin Islands	March 13	March 25	September 8	No	All	No	Yes (remainder of term)	Yes	Yes	Yes	
Vermont	March 16	March 25	May 15	No	10 or more	Mandatory quarantine	Yes (remainder of term)	Yes	Yes	Yes	
Virginia	March 12	March 30	June 10	Yes	10 or more	No	Yes (remainder of term)	Yes	Yes	Restricted	
(Washington (state)) Washington	February 29	March 23	May 4	Yes	All	No	Yes (remainder of term)	Yes	Yes	Yes	
West Virginia	March 4	March 23	May 4	Yes	All	No	Yes (remainder of term)	Yes	Yes	Yes	
Wisconsin	March 12	March 25 (declared unconstitutional on May 13)	May 26 (declared unconstitutional on May 13)	Yes	All	Mandatory quarantine	Yes (remainder of term)	Restricted	Yes	Yes	
Wyoming	March 12	Regional	N/a	No	10 or more	Mandatory quarantine	Yes (remainder of term)	Yes	Yes	No	

In Michigan, Puerto Rico, Texas, and Vermont, retailers who sold a mix of essential and non-essential items were only allowed to sell essential items.

=== Fully reopening for states that chose to shut down ===
==== September 2020 ====
Florida nearly fully reopened on September 25, 2020. All businesses were allowed to reopen at 100% except bars which were allowed to be restricted to 50% capacity by local governments. The governor, after initially leaving mask mandates up to local governments, overrode all local mandates and announced that no Florida government could fine someone for failing to social distance or wear a mask.

==== February 2021 ====
On February 5, Iowa announced that all mandates would be repealed by February 8. This caught some by surprise since Iowa was struggling (compared to other states) to distribute coronavirus vaccines in early February.

On February 26, Arkansas fully repealed all mandates except for a mask mandate, which the governor said would likely be repealed at the end of March. Arkansas continues to make recommendations.

==== March 2021 ====
Mississippi announced on March 2, 2021, that it would fully reopen on March 3. The state would continue to make recommendations, but would repeal all mandates. Texas also announced on March 2 that it would be fully reopened on March 10, 2021, with no mask requirements; the state would continue to issue recommendations.

Wyoming announced on March 8, 2021, that it will fully reopen March 16. That reopening would include ending its mask mandate. Additionally, by March 11, 2021, Connecticut and West Virginia had fully reopened except for mask mandates, and Arizona had fully reopened except for mask and social distancing mandates.

== Indian Reservations ==
On March 19, the Wiyot Tribe issued a shelter-in-place order on the Table Bluff Reservation effective March 20 to April 7.

The Navajo Nation imposed a stay-at-home order on the entire reservation, the largest reservation in the country, on March 20. The Navajo Nation reissued this order on March 24.

The Northern Cheyenne and Crow Indian reservations in Montana imposed curfews.

On March 21, the Makah Reservation in northwestern Washington State issued a shelter-in-place order. On March 22, the Lummi Nation also announced a shelter in place order after five cases in the area were confirmed, including two members of the tribe.

On March 23, the Red Lake Indian Reservation in northwestern Minnesota issued a shelter-in-place order and curfew for 30 days. The Southern Ute Indian Reservation in southwestern Colorado issued a stay-at-home advisory. On March 26, the reservation closed its borders and replaced its stay-at-home advisory with a mandatory order.

On March 23, the Eastern Shoshone and Northern Arapaho tribes issued a joint stay-at-home directive for the Wind River Indian Reservation. The Quinault Indian Nation issued a shelter-in-place order for the Quinault Reservation until further notice.

On March 24, the Nooksack Tribe issued a shelter-in-place order effective March 24 until April 7. The Swinomish Tribe issued a stay-at-home order for the Swinomish Indian Tribal Community effective March 25 through April 6.

On March 26, the Mille Lacs Indian Reservation issued a stay-at-home order effective March 27 until further notice. The Confederated Salish and Kootenai Tribes issued a shelter-in-place order for the Flathead Indian Reservation effective March 26.

On March 27, the Crow Tribe of Montana and Northern Cheyenne Tribe issued stay-at-home orders for the Crow and Northern Cheyenne Indian reservations, respectively, effective March 28 through April 10. The Nez Perce Tribe of Idaho issued a stay-at-home order effective until further notice. The Shoshone-Bannock tribes issued a stay-at-home order for the Fort Hall Indian Reservation effective until April 17. The Coeur d'Alene Reservation issued a stay-at-home order. The Rosebud Sioux Tribe issued a shelter-in-place order for the Rosebud Indian Reservation (which is coterminous with Todd County, South Dakota).

All 22 tribes in Arizona, including the Ak-Chin Indian Community, Gila River Indian Community, Hualapai Tribe, Salt River Pima Maricopa Indian Community, and Tohono Oʼodham Nation, have declared states of emergency, closed facilities and casinos, and limited governmental business to essential functions, among other measures.

=== CARES Act and tribal nations ===
On March 25, Congress announced that $8 billion of the CARES Act would be allocated to help native tribes fight COVID-19. More than $600 million was redistributed to the Navajo Nation. On 22 April 2020, 10 tribal nations (including Alaska's Akiak Native Community, Asaʼcararmiut Tribe, Aleut Community of St. Paul Island, and the Navajo Nation) began procedures to sue the U.S. Treasury and Interior department secretaries over the allocation of funds to Alaska Native corporations. In May 2020, the Department of Treasury stated that the funding for Alaska Native corporations would be held back while the lawsuit awaited a decision.

== See also ==
- U.S. federal government response to the COVID-19 pandemic
- Impact of the COVID-19 pandemic on religion
- Impact of the COVID-19 pandemic on politics
- Impact of the COVID-19 pandemic on education
- Political effects of Hurricane Katrina
