= 2022 in the Northern Mariana Islands =

- Decades: 2000s; 2010s; 2020s
- See also: History of the Northern Mariana Islands; Historical outline of the Northern Mariana Islands; List of years in the Northern Mariana Islands; 2022 in the United States

Events from 2022 in the Northern Mariana Islands.

== Incumbents ==
- Governor: Ralph Torres
- Lieutenant Governor: Arnold Palacios

== Events ==
Ongoing – COVID-19 pandemic in the Northern Mariana Islands

- 8 November – The 2022 Northern Mariana Islands gubernatorial election took place
- 25 November – The runoff election is won by Arnold Palacios, who took over as Governor in January 2023.

=== Sports ===
- 17 to 25 June – The 2022 Pacific Mini Games were held Saipan.
