= 2024 in the Northern Mariana Islands =

- Decades: 2000s; 2010s; 2020s
- See also: History of the Northern Mariana Islands; Historical outline of the Northern Mariana Islands; List of years in the Northern Mariana Islands; 2024 in the United States

Events from 2024 in the Northern Mariana Islands.

== Incumbents ==
- Governor: Arnold Palacios
- Lieutenant Governor: David M. Apatang

== Holidays ==
- 1 January - New Year's Day
- 15 January - Martin Luther King Jr. Day
- 19 February – Presidents' Day
- 24 March – Commonwealth Covenant Day
- 29 March – Good Friday
- 27 May – Memorial Day
- 19 June – Juneteenth
- 4 July - Independence Day
- 2 September – Labor Day
- 14 October – Commonwealth Cultural Day
- 4 November – Citizenship Day
- 11 November – Veterans Day
- 28 November – Thanksgiving
- 8 December – Constitution Day
- 25 December -– Christmas Day

== Deaths ==
- January 4 – Felicidad Ogumoro, 74, politician, vice speaker of the House of Representatives (2010–2013).

== See also ==
- An Act to amend Public Law 93-435 with respect to the Northern Mariana Islands
