= 2020 in the Northern Mariana Islands =

- Decades: 2000s; 2010s; 2020s
- See also: History of the Northern Mariana Islands; Historical outline of the Northern Mariana Islands; List of years in the Northern Mariana Islands; 2020 in the United States

Events from 2020 in the Northern Mariana Islands.

== Incumbents ==
- Governor: Ralph Torres
- Lieutenant Governor: Arnold Palacios

== Events ==
Ongoing – COVID-19 pandemic in the Northern Mariana Islands

- 28 March – The islands confirmed their first two COVID-19 cases.
