= 2026 in the Northern Mariana Islands =

- Decades: 2000s; 2010s; 2020s
- See also: History of the Northern Mariana Islands; Historical outline of the Northern Mariana Islands; List of years in the Northern Mariana Islands; 2026 in the United States

Events from 2026 in the Northern Mariana Islands.

== Incumbents ==
- Governor: David M. Apatang
- Lieutenant Governor: Dennis C. Mendiola

== Events ==
- April 11 – A typhoon watch is declared ahead of Typhoon Sinlaku, which makes landfall April 14.
- April 15 – A cargo ship capsizes off the coast of the Northern Mariana Islands during Typhoon Sinlaku. Six crew members are lost; the bodt of one is recovered.
- April 24 – United States President Donald Trump declares a state of major disaster in the Northern Marianas Islands following Typhoon Sinlaku, allowing eligible residents to apply for disaster relief.
- August 23 – Chinese national Lian Yong Wei dies in the custody of ICE in Saipan.
- November 3:
  - 2026 Northern Mariana Islands general election
  - 2026 United States House of Representatives election in Northern Mariana Islands: Kimberlyn King-Hinds wins reelection.

== Holidays ==
- 1 January - New Year's Day
- 19 January - Martin Luther King Jr. Day
- 16 February – Presidents' Day
- 24 March – Commonwealth Covenant Day
- 3 April – Good Friday
- 25 May – Memorial Day
- 19 June – Juneteenth
- 4 July - Independence Day
- 7 September – Labor Day
- 12 October – Commonwealth Cultural Day
- 4 November – Citizenship Day
- 11 November – Veterans Day
- 26 November – Thanksgiving
- 8 December – Constitution Day
- 25 December – Christmas Day
