= 2025 in the Northern Mariana Islands =

- Decades: 2000s; 2010s; 2020s
- See also: History of the Northern Mariana Islands; Historical outline of the Northern Mariana Islands; List of years in the Northern Mariana Islands; 2025 in the United States

Events from 2025 in the Northern Mariana Islands.

== Incumbents ==
- Governor: Arnold Palacios (until July 23), David M. Apatang (starting July 23)
- Lieutenant Governor: David M. Apatang (until July 23), Dennis C. Mendiola (starting July 23)

== Holidays ==
- 1 January - New Year's Day
- 20 January - Martin Luther King Jr. Day
- 17 February – Presidents' Day
- 24 March – Commonwealth Covenant Day
- 18 April – Good Friday
- 26 May – Memorial Day
- 19 June – Juneteenth
- 4 July - Independence Day
- 1 September – Labor Day
- 13 October – Commonwealth Cultural Day
- 4 November – Citizenship Day
- 11 November – Veterans Day
- 27 November – Thanksgiving
- 8 December – Constitution Day
- 25 December – Christmas Day

== Events ==
- July 24 – Lieutenant Governor David M. Apatang is sworn in as the new governor of the Northern Mariana Islands following the death of Governor Arnold Palacios the previous day.

== Deaths ==
- 23 July – Arnold Palacios, 69, governor (since 2023), lieutenant governor (2019–2023) and president of the Senate (2017–2019).

== See also ==
- An Act to amend Public Law 93-435 with respect to the Northern Mariana Islands
