= 2019 in the Northern Mariana Islands =

- Decades: 1990s; 2000s; 2010s; 2020s
- See also: History of the Northern Mariana Islands; Historical outline of the Northern Mariana Islands; List of years in the Northern Mariana Islands; 2019 in the United States

Events in the year 2019 in the Northern Mariana Islands.

== Incumbents ==
- Governor: Ralph Torres
- Lieutenant Governor: Victor Hocog (until 14 January), Arnold Palacios (starting 14 January)

== Deaths ==
- 6 January – Francisco Dela Cruz, politician, member of the House of Representatives (b. 1962).
