= List of years in the Northern Mariana Islands =

This is a list of the individual Northern Mariana Islands year pages. On November 4, 1986, the Northern Mariana Islands came under United States sovereignty.

== 20th century ==
1980s
1986
1987
1988
1989

1990s
1990
1991
1992
1993
1994
1995
1996
1997
1998
1999

== 21st century ==
2000s
2000
2001
2002
2003
2004
2005
2006
2007
2008
2009

2010s
2010
2011
2012
2013
2014
2015
2016
2017
2018
2019

2020s
2020
2021
2022
2023
2024
2025
2026
2027
2028
2029

== See also ==
- History of the Northern Mariana Islands
- List of years in the United States
