= 2023 in the Northern Mariana Islands =

- Decades: 2000s; 2010s; 2020s
- See also: History of the Northern Mariana Islands; Historical outline of the Northern Mariana Islands; List of years in the Northern Mariana Islands; 2023 in the United States

Events from 2023 in the Northern Mariana Islands.

== Incumbents ==
- Governor: Ralph Torres (until 9 January); Arnold Palacios (from 9 January)
- Lieutenant Governor: Arnold Palacios (until 9 January); David M. Apatang (from 9 January)

== Events ==
Ongoing – COVID-19 pandemic in the Northern Mariana Islands

- 9 January – Arnold Palacios takes over as Governor.
- 24 May – People in Guam and the Northern Mariana Islands are told to seek refuge as Typhoon Mawar approaches with winds reaching 282 km/h.

== Deaths ==
- 4 February – Edward Pangelinan, politician (born 1941).
