= 2018 in the Northern Mariana Islands =

- Decades: 1990s; 2000s; 2010s; 2020s
- See also: History of the Northern Mariana Islands; Historical outline of the Northern Mariana Islands; List of years in the Northern Mariana Islands; 2018 in the United States

Events in the year 2018 in the Northern Mariana Islands.

== Incumbents ==
- President: Donald Trump
- Governor: Ralph Torres

== Events ==
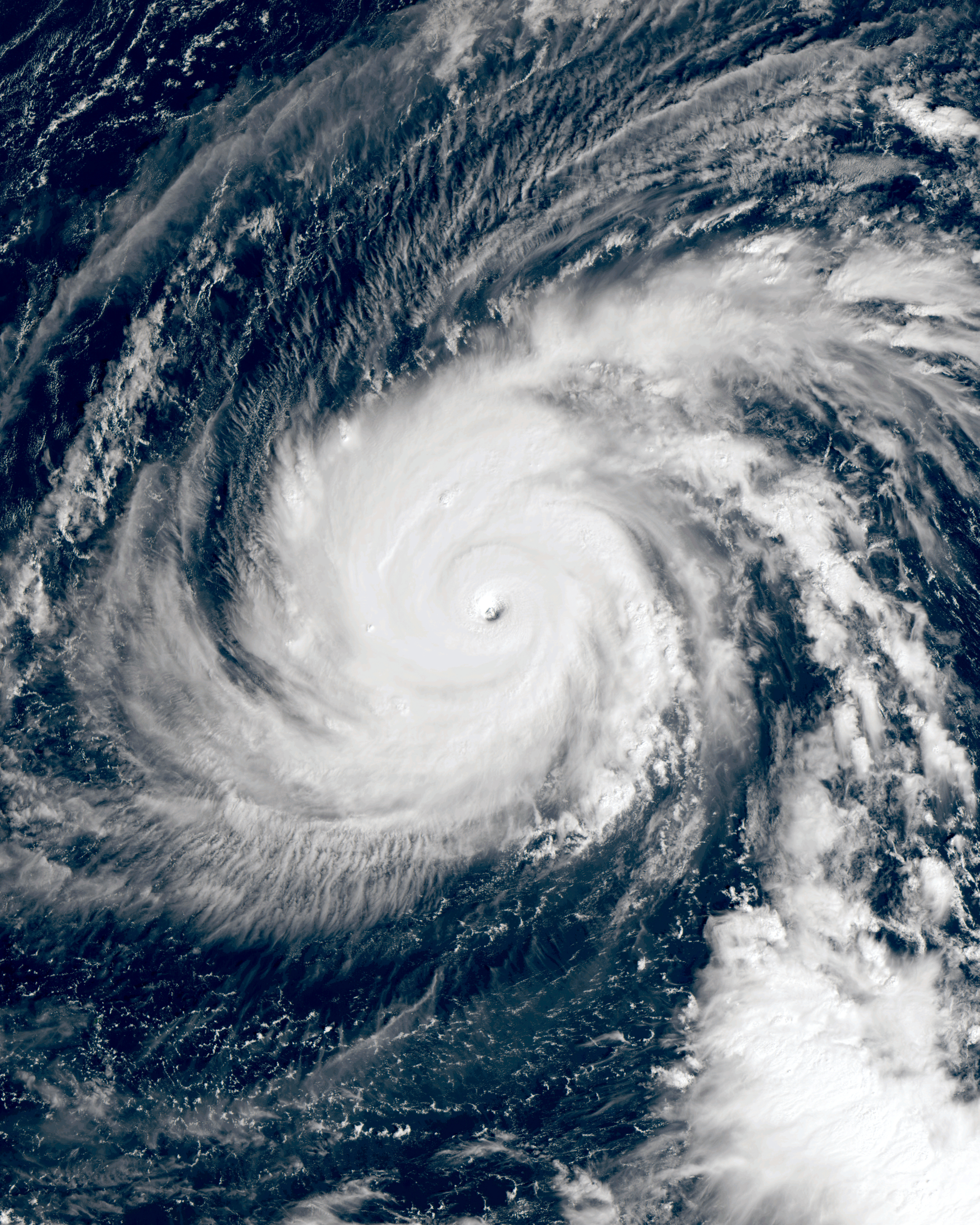
Typhoon Yutu at peak intensity over Tinian on 24 October

- 24 October – The Typhoon Yutu caused catastrophic damage to the islands of Tinian and Saipan, and became the strongest tropical cyclone to ever impact the Mariana Islands.
- 13 November – 2018 Northern Mariana Islands general election
- 13 November – The 2018 Northern Mariana Islands gubernatorial election had two candidates, and incumbent Governor Ralph Torres won the election ahead of Juan Babauta.

== Deaths ==
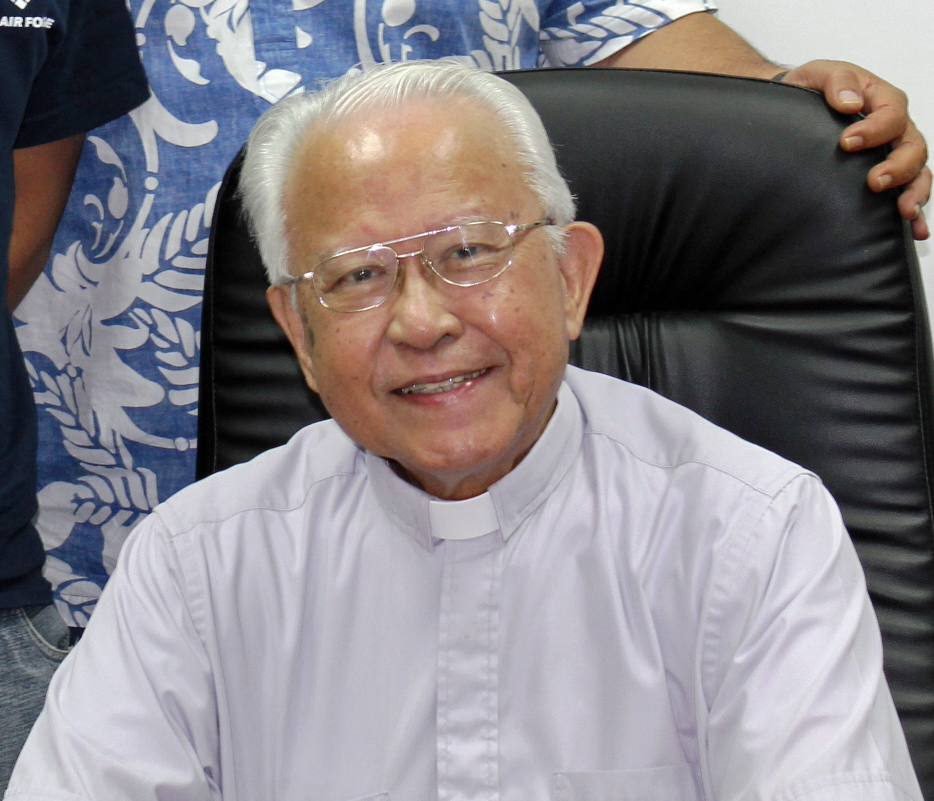
Tomas Aguon Camacho

- 5 March – Tomas Aguon Camacho, Roman Catholic Bishop (b. 1933).
- 20 March – Ramon Deleon Guerrero, politician (b. 1946)
