= An Act to amend Public Law 93-435 with respect to the Northern Mariana Islands =

Bill of the 113th Congress

- Long title: To amend Public Law 93–435 with respect to the Northern Mariana Islands, providing parity with Guam, the Virgin Islands, and American Samoa.
- Announced in: the 113th United States Congress
- Sponsored by: Del. Gregorio Kilili Camacho Sablan (D, MP-0)
- Number of co-sponsors: 34

Codification
- U.S.C. sections affected: 48 U.S.C. § 1705, 48 U.S.C. § 1706,

Legislative history
- Introduced in the House as H.R. 573 by Rep. Gregorio Sablan (D-CNMI) on February 6, 2013; Committee consideration by United States House Committee on Natural Resources, United States House Natural Resources Subcommittee on Fisheries, Wildlife, Oceans and Insular Affairs

The bill H.R. 573 (H.R. 573) (long title: To amend Public Law 93-435 with respect to the Northern Mariana Islands, providing parity with Guam, the Virgin Islands, and American Samoa) is a bill that was introduced into the United States House of Representatives in the 113th United States Congress. The bill would extend the geographic boundaries of the Commonwealth of the Northern Mariana Islands and would allow the United States Military to establish naval defensive sea areas and airspace reservations when necessary for national defense.

== Provisions/Elements of the bill ==
This summary is based largely on the summary provided by the Congressional Research Service, a public domain source.

If enacted H.R. 573 would accomplish two main things. First, to the government of the Commonwealth of the Northern Mariana Islands, it would convey submerged lands surrounding such Islands and extending three geographical miles outward from their coastlines. Second, it would include the Northern Mariana Islands among the islands where the President of the United States may establish naval defensive sea areas and airspace reservations when necessary for national defense.

== Procedural history ==
H.R. 573 was introduced into the House by Rep. Gregorio Sablan (D-CNMI) on February 6, 2013. It was referred to the United States House Committee on Natural Resources and then to the United States House Natural Resources Subcommittee on Fisheries, Wildlife, Oceans and Insular Affairs.

The House Majority Leader Eric Cantor announced on Friday, May 10, 2013, that H.R. 1580 would be considered the following week.

As of May 14, 2013, the bill had 36 co-sponsors - 33 Democrats and 3 Republicans.

== See also ==
- Northern Mariana Islands
- List of bills in the 113th United States Congress
