= Health Alert Network =

The Health Alert Network (HAN) is a program run by the Centers for Disease Control and Prevention to provide public health assistance to American communities.

The HAN project is intended to "ensure that each community has rapid and timely access to emergent health information; a cadre of highly-trained professional personnel; and evidence-based practices and procedures for effective public health preparedness, response, and service on a 24/7 basis."

HAN provides vital health information and the infrastructure to support the dissemination of that information at the state and local levels. A vast majority of the State-based HAN programs have over 90% of their population covered under the umbrella of HAN.

The HAN Messaging System currently directly and indirectly transmits Health Alerts, Advisories, and Updates to over one million recipients. The current system is being phased into the overall PHIN messaging component.
