= Greater Sullivan County Public Health Network =

The Greater Sullivan County Public Health Network (GSCPHN) is a collaborative of municipalities and health and human service agencies in the greater Sullivan County region. The GSCPHN is one of 15 public health regions in the state of New Hampshire in the United States. The Greater Sullivan County Public Health Network strives to increase planning and collaboration across municipal boundaries and health and safety sectors.

== Background ==
The state of New Hampshire does not have county health departments. Rather, the state is geographically divided into 15 public health regions. Together these 15 public health regions comprise the New Hampshire Public Health Network system. The Greater Sullivan County Public Health Network is housed by the Sullivan County government and is financed under an agreement with the New Hampshire Department of Health & Human Services - Division of Public Health Services with funds provided by the Centers for Disease Control and Prevention.

The Greater Sullivan County Public Health Network is bordered by the Greater Monadnock Public Health Network to the south, the Upper Valley Public Health Network to the north, and the Franklin/Bristol Public Health Network and Greater Concord Public Health Network to the east.

== Service area ==
The Greater Sullivan County Public Health Network serves 15 municipalities in New Hampshire: Acworth, Charlestown, Claremont, Croydon, Goshen, Langdon, Lempster, New London, Newbury, Newport, Springfield, Sunapee, Sutton, Unity, and Wilmot. The combined population of these municipalities is around 30,000 people.

== Mission ==
The mission of the Greater Sullivan County Public Health Network is to work closely with regional partners to create consistent public health messages and programs, and to ensure that the region is prepared for health emergencies. The GSCPHN is committed to helping people live healthier lives - in accordance with the Sullivan County mission "All Day, Every Day, We Make Life Better."

== Regional partners ==
The Greater Sullivan County Regional Coordination Committee (RCC) is a collaborative group of town officials, health officers, fire department personnel, police officers, subject matter experts, schools, faith-based organizations and non-profit organizations from the Greater Sullivan region. The RCC includes representatives from each of the 15 towns that the GSCPHN serves. Additional partners include representatives from organizations and agencies that serve the citizens of the Sullivan County region: Sullivan County, Sullivan County Nursing Home, Valley Regional Hospital, New London Hospital, Connecticut Valley Home Care, Lake Sunapee Region VNA and Hospice, SAU #6 Claremont School District, SAU #43 Newport School District, SAU #60 Fall Mountain Regional School District, SAU #85 Sunapee School District, Newton-Bartlett Funeral Home, the American Red Cross, Golden Cross Ambulance Service, the New Hampshire Department of Health & Human Services, the Centers for Disease Control and Prevention, the New Hampshire Department of Safety - Division of Homeland Security & Emergency Management, and the NH Community Health Institute.

== H1N1 pandemic (2009-2010) ==
During the H1N1 pandemic, the Greater Sullivan County Public Health Network was the lead public health agency in the Sullivan County region, and was responsible for coordinating and conducting all public vaccine clinics. The GSCPHN administered over 1,500 doses of H1N1 vaccine at 34 public vaccine clinics during the H1N1 pandemic.

== Medical Reserve Corps unit ==
The GSCPHN oversees the Greater Sullivan County Medical Reserve Corps unit. This unit was organized to support first responders during a disaster or public health emergency.
