= Greater Monadnock Public Health Network =

The Greater Monadnock Public Health Network (GMPHN) is a community health and safety collaborative which works to enhance and improve public health-related services. Formerly known as the Cheshire Public Health Network, the GMPHN is one of 15 public health regions in the state of New Hampshire. The Greater Monadnock Public Health Network strives to increase planning and collaboration across municipal boundaries and health and safety sectors.

== About ==
The state of New Hampshire does not have county health departments. Rather, the state is geographically divided into 15 public health regions. Together these 15 public health regions comprise the New Hampshire Public Health Network system.

The Greater Monadnock Public Health Network is housed by Cheshire Medical Center and in collaboration with Cheshire County is financed under an agreement with the New Hampshire Department of Health & Human Services - Division of Public Health Services with funds provided by the Centers for Disease Control and Prevention.

The Greater Monadnock Public Health Network is bordered by the Greater Sullivan County Public Health Network to the north, and the Greater Concord Public Health Network, Greater Manchester Public Health Network, and Greater Nashua Public Health Network to the east.

== Service area ==
The Greater Monadnock Public Health Network serves 33 municipalities in the Monadnock region (all of Cheshire County and the 10 westernmost towns in Hillsborough County). The municipalities are Alstead, Antrim, Bennington, Chesterfield, Dublin, Fitzwilliam, Francestown, Gilsum, Greenfield, Greenville, Hancock, Harrisville, Hinsdale, Jaffrey, Keene, Marlborough, Marlow, Nelson, New Ipswich, Peterborough, Richmond, Rindge, Roxbury, Sharon, Stoddard, Sullivan, Surry, Swanzey, Temple, Troy, Walpole, Westmoreland, and Winchester.

== Mission ==
The mission of the Greater Monadnock Public Health Network is to:

1. Coordinate regional health and safety services among local government, health and social service agencies, businesses, hospitals, schools, first responders, faith-based organizations and emergency preparedness and response initiatives;
2. Continually assess resources to inventory strengths and gaps;
3. Identify needs and promote wise use of existing resources;
4. Advance and improve resources via technical assistance, educational programs, trainings, exercises, and drills; and
5. Create and test models for public health emergencies, and maintain the region's public health emergency preparedness and response plans.

== Regional partners ==
Over 50 municipalities, agencies, and organizations comprise the membership of the GMPHN's Regional Coordinating Committee. Key partners include representatives from each of the municipalities, including selectmen, town managers/administrators, emergency management directors, health officers, fire and police personnel, school nurses, and human service directors.

Additional partners include representatives from organizations and agencies that serve the citizens of the Monadnock region: Cheshire Medical Center / Dartmouth-Hitchcock Keene, Monadnock Community Hospital, Cheshire County Government, Home Healthcare, Hospice & Community Services, the American Red Cross, Monadnock United Way, Monadnock Family Services, Keene State College, Franklin Pierce University, School Administrative Units (SAUs) 1, 24, 29, 47, 60, 87, 92, 93, 94, Southwestern NH Fire Mutual Aid, Southwestern Community Services, the New Hampshire Department of Health & Human Services, and the New Hampshire Department of Safety - Division of Homeland Security & Emergency Management.

== H1N1 pandemic (2009-2010) ==
During the H1N1 pandemic, the Greater Monadnock Public Health Network was the lead public health agency in the Monadnock region, and was responsible for coordinating and conducting all public vaccine clinics. From early December 2009 through the spring of 2010, the Greater Monadnock Public Health Network conducted some 94 free vaccine clinics and administered over 7,000 doses of H1N1 vaccine to the public.

== Medical Reserve Corps Unit ==
The GMPHN oversees the Greater Monadnock Medical Reserve Corps unit. This unit was organized to support first responders during a disaster or public health emergency. The Greater Monadnock Medical Reserve Corps (GMMRC) members are trained and credentialed. The GMMRC helped respond to the H1N1 pandemic, and also deployed volunteers to assist during Hurricane Irene in 2011. The GMMRC unit is also involved in various non-emergency public health initiatives in the Monadnock region.

== Emergency Alert System ==
The Greater Monadnock Public Health Network is responsible for maintaining the Monadnock region's emergency alert system. Monadnock residents sign up for free text message alerts and free email alerts by going to www.nixle.com. Alternately, Monadnock residents who want to only receive free text message alerts text the word GMPHN to 888777. Currently over 5,300 Monadnock residents have opted into the Greater Monadnock Public Health Network's emergency alert system.
