= COVID-19 pandemic in New Hampshire =

Ongoing COVID-19 viral pandemic in New Hampshire, United States

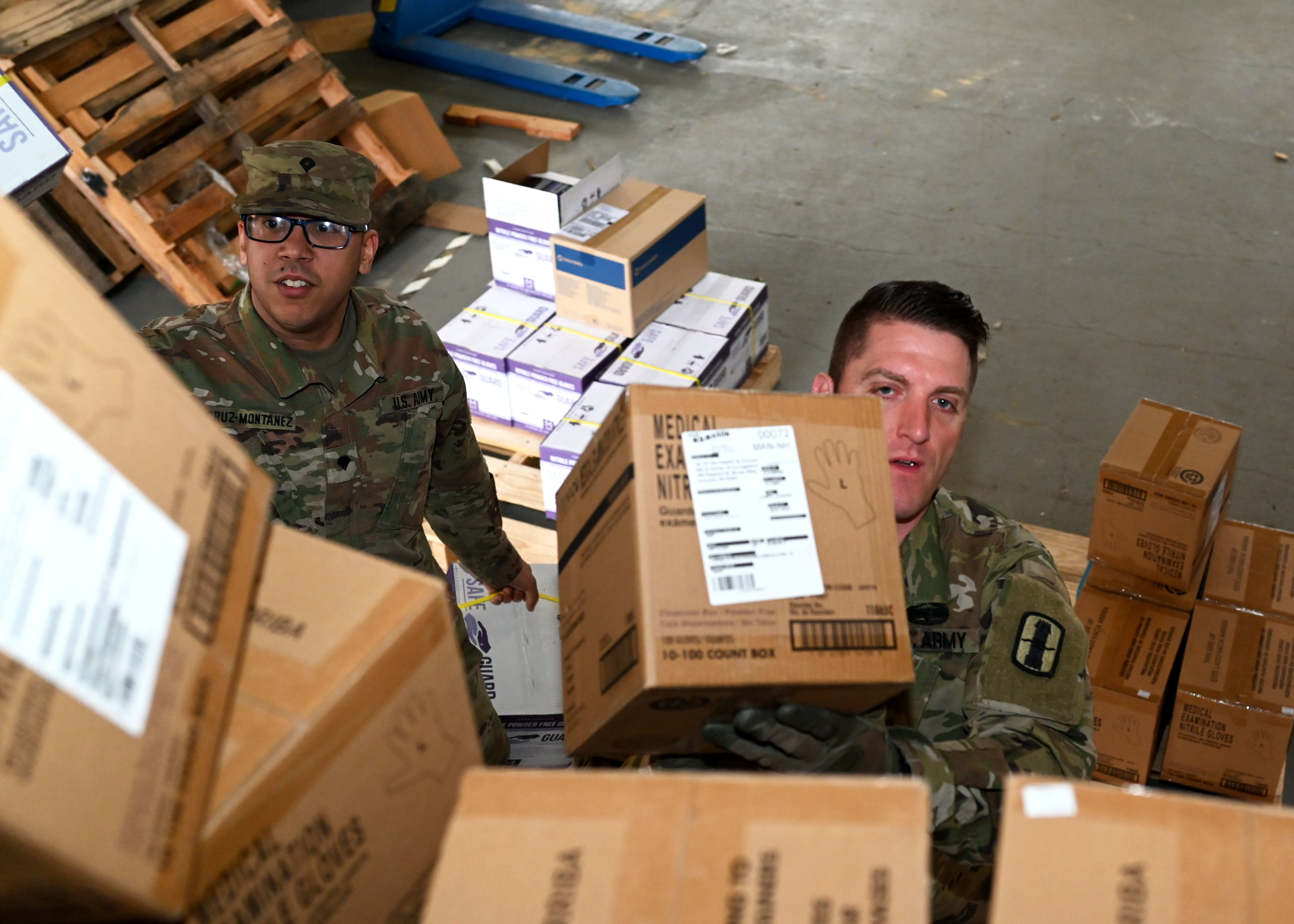
- The NH National Guard loading boxes of personal protective equipment in Concord
- Disease: COVID-19
- Pathogen: SARS-CoV-2
- Location: New Hampshire, U.S.
- Index case: Grafton County
- Arrival date: March 2, 2020
- Confirmed cases: 344,823
- Hospitalized cases: 849 (cumulative); 185 (current)
- Recovered: 19,864
- Deaths: 2,662

Government website
- www.nh.gov/covid19

The COVID-19 pandemic in New Hampshire is part of an ongoing pandemic of coronavirus disease 2019 (COVID-19) in the U.S. state of New Hampshire. The first confirmed case was reported on March 2, 2020. A state of emergency was declared March 13, which included a ban on gatherings of 50 or more people. A small group filed a lawsuit claiming the order infringed on their right to assemble and worship; a judge dismissed the suit. On March 26, all nonessential businesses were closed and Governor Chris Sununu advised people to only leave home for essential necessities. That stay-at-home order was extended several times before being allowed to expire on June 15. Through November 22, a total of 74 emergency orders had been issued by Sununu. Sununu lifted the mask mandate as of April 16, 2021.

On March 29, the New Hampshire Department of Health and Human Services (DHHS) launched a dashboard with daily updates regarding the spread of the coronavirus in the state. Counts as of the first day of each month have been reported as follows:

Date	Cumulative totals			Ref.
Date	Cases	Hospitalizations	Deaths	Ref.
April 1	415	58	4	
May 1	2,310	270	81	
June 1	4,685	456	245	
July 1	5,802	565	373	
August 1	6,613	695	416	
September 1	7,297	715	432	
October 1	8,317	738	441	
November 1	11,214	780	483	
December 1	21,766	841	528	
January 1	45,154	910	769	
February 1	66,058	1,036	1,059	
March 1	75,588	1,118	1,170	

As of October 20, 2021, New Hampshire has administered 996,103 COVID-19 vaccine first doses. This covers 73% of the population. There are 849,565 people who are fully vaccinated, which accounts for 62% of the population.

== Timeline ==
=== March ===
The first reported case was on March 2, of a male Dartmouth–Hitchcock Medical Center employee who had recently returned from a trip to Italy. A second case, a man who had had close contact with the first reported case, was confirmed the following day, March 3. The man with the first case had defied quarantine orders and attended a private event organized by Dartmouth College's Tuck School of Business in White River Junction, Vermont, on February 28.

The third and fourth cases were reported on March 7 concerning a man from Grafton County who believed he contracted it at a church, leading the Hope Bible Fellowship church to cancel all activities. The fourth case involved a man from Rockingham County who had been in Italy.

On March 13, the seventh case was reported from a resident of Rockingham County who had visited the NH Division of Motor Vehicles Manchester office from March 2 to 10.

March 23 marked the date of the first confirmed death due to the virus in the state, as the number of confirmed cases in state rose to above one hundred. The second death from the virus, a man from Hillsborough County, was confirmed on March 27.

=== April ===
Throughout the month of April, the New Hampshire Department of Health and Human Services' daily updates note rising cases of COVID-19 through community-based transmission or cases that cannot be traced to contact with a person with a confirmed COVID-19 diagnosis or recent travel.

The first confirmed case of COVID-19 is reported in Coos county on April 3.

In April, COVID-19 outbreaks were reported in long-term care facilities and nursing homes in Greenfield, Manchester, Nashua, Concord, Salem, Dover, Derry and Franklin.

=== August ===
On August 2, the Foxwoods Resort Casino 301 NASCAR race was held at New Hampshire Motor Speedway with 12,000 to 15,000 fans in attendance, "the largest gathering for a sports event in New England since the onset of the coronavirus pandemic."

On August 8, 16 people who attended events hosted at a church in Windham tested positive.

On August 25, 10 prisoners and one staff member had tested positive in the Rockingham County Department of Corrections. A long-term care facility in Manchester reported 27 residents and 16 employees had tested positive, and there were 7 deaths.

On August 26, there were six confirmed cases among New Hampshire residents who had attended the Sturgis Motorcycle Rally in South Dakota.

On August 29, over 100 people attended a fraternity party at the University of New Hampshire. Few of them wore masks.

=== September ===
In September, 11 positive cases were reported from the August 29 fraternity party at the University of New Hampshire.

=== December ===
On December 7, New Hampshire passed 25,000 cumulative cases of COVID-19 since the start of the pandemic.

== Government response ==
=== 2020 ===
==== March ====
On March 13, with the seventh case reported in the state, Governor Chris Sununu declared a state of emergency. This limited visitors to assisted living and long-term care facilities, and suspended out-of-state trips for state employees. The seventh case was the first for which an advisory was issued to the public for potential exposure specifically at Manchester's Division of Motor Vehicles branch from March 2 to March 5. Over the next few days, more measures to limit the spread of the virus were announced including the closure of K-12 public schools on March 15, and the closure of restaurants and bars except for takeout and delivery and a limit on gatherings of more than fifty people beginning March 16. In addition to these restrictions, unemployment benefits were expanded to those temporarily out of work due to COVID-19-related closures or due to self-quarantining, and evictions and utility disconnections were banned to help those affected by the spread of the virus.

On March 17 and 18, the American Civil Liberties Union of NH (ACLU-NH) and the New Hampshire Association of Criminal Defense Lawyers (NHACDL) urged correctional facilities in the state to release COVID-19 response plans and incorporate policies that protect the civil rights of incarcerated individuals. These policies included limits on number of people arrested and incarcerated, cost reduction for means of remote communication, testing and treatment protocols, and additional precautions for incarcerated individuals who are extra vulnerable to COVID-19. Corrections Commissioner Helen Hanks responded on March 18 that correction facilities had already started to adopt some of these policies.

On March 26, Sununu announced a stay-at-home order going into effect the following day at midnight requiring the closure of all non-essential in-person businesses.

==== April ====
Governor Chris Sununu issued Emergency Orders 21 through 38 and Executive Orders 2020-05 through 2020-07 during the month of April. These orders increased funding (21, 22), modified governmental procedure to follow health guidelines (23, 29, 35, 37, 38), extended the state of emergency in New Hampshire (2020-05, 2020-08), clarified or amended previous orders (24, 25, 2020-07), restricted hotels to vulnerable populations and essential workers (27), created plans to isolate COVID-19 positive first responders and homeless folks (28), outlined new healthcare or health insurance requirements (30, 34, 36), established the Governor's Office for Emergency Relief and Recovery (2020-06), established the COVID-19 Long Term Care Stabilization Program (31), extended previous orders implementing remote instruction for public k-12 schools (32), activated the New Hampshire Crisis Standards of Care Plan (33).

==== May ====
On May 1, Sununu extended the stay-at-home order until May 31, while relaxing restrictions on some businesses effective May 11.

On May 6, Sununu announced a new online COVID-19 testing registration portal. Residents with COVID-19 symptoms, underlying health conditions, age over 60, or are healthcare workers can use the portal to request testing without medical referral. This portal supplements existing means for requesting tests, which are through healthcare providers or by calling the COVID-19 Coordinating Office. More than 2,200 residents requested testing within the first 24 hours of the portal's launch. Additionally, due to the stabilizing of the COVID-19 outbreak and subsequent transition to containment, the New Hampshire Department of Health & Human Services (NH DHHS) recommended on May 7 that health service providers administer testing to all patients with at least mild symptoms of COVID-19.

On May 29, Sununu extended the stay-at-home order until June 15. The NH DHHS also introduced a new dashboard on this day to help the public track COVID-19 impact on the community daily. This replaced the COVID-19 Weekly Summary Report.

==== June ====
On June 1, beaches were allowed to reopen, with restrictions, such as no parking being allowed along Route 1A; Ocean Boulevard in the area of the Hampton Beach Casino Ballroom was closed to vehicular traffic in order to create "a walking mall for better social distancing."

On June 11, Sununu confirmed that the stay-at-home order would expire on June 15. This included eliminating the 10-people-or-under limit for group gatherings and allowing businesses previously deemed non-essential (such as gyms, libraries, and pools) to re-open or expand. Residents were encouraged to continue wearing masks in public and observe social distancing.

On June 25, New Hampshire Motor Speedway announced that it would welcome fans for a NASCAR race on August 2 following guidelines from Sununu to restrict attendance to 35% capacity; the event had originally been scheduled for July 19. A series of distancing measures, cleaning protocols, and logistical modifications were to be put into place.

==== August ====
On August 11, Sununu issued an executive order mandating masks for all social gatherings of over 100 people, in anticipation of Laconia Motorcycle Week.

==== November ====
On November 20, a statewide mask mandate went into effect, per an executive order from Sununu, applicable to "anyone over the age of 5 in indoor public spaces and outdoors when social distancing cannot be maintained." The order was issued to remain in effect through January 15, 2021.

=== 2021 ===
On April 15, 2021, Governor Sununu lifted the mask mandate, given that vaccinations were increasing, deaths were decreasing, and hospitalizations "remain manageable."

In September 2021, New Hampshire state representative William Marsh changed his party affiliation from Republican to Democrat, citing his opposition to the state Republican party's policies against vaccine mandates and mask mandates.

== Statistics ==
COVID-19 pandemic medical cases in New Hampshire by county
County (Note: County where individuals with a positive case reside. Location of diagnosis and treatment may vary.)	Cases (Note: Reported confirmed cases. Actual case numbers are probably higher.) (Note: Includes 2,364 cases from unknown counties.)	Hosp. (Note: Includes 22 hospitalized cases from unknown counties.)	Deaths	Population (Note: July 2019 population estimate from "U.S. Census Bureau Quick Facts: New Hampshire". United States Census Bureau.)	Cases / 100k
10 / 10	382,242	9,441	3,055	1,359,711	28,112.0
Belknap	17,713	642	222	61,303	28,894.2
Carroll	12,454	374	76	48,910	25,463.1
Cheshire	19,368	354	137	76,085	25,455.7
Coos	8,477	165	139	31,563	26,857.4
Grafton	23,518	324	105	89,886	26,164.3
Hillsborough	122,531	3,577	1,055	417,025	29,382.2
Merrimack	40,594	1,340	314	151,391	26,814.0
Rockingham	85,574	1,392	667	309,769	27,625.1
Strafford	37,664	958	254	130,633	28,831.9
Sullivan	11,985	293	86	43,146	27,777.8
Final update May 11, 2023, with data through the previous day Data is publicly reported by New Hampshire Department of Health and Human Services

== See also ==
- Timeline of the COVID-19 pandemic in the United States
- COVID-19 pandemic in the United States – for impact on the country
- COVID-19 pandemic – for impact on other countries
