= 2009 swine flu pandemic in the United States =

Reported cases by state/territory
State or territory	State-reported confirmed cases	State-reported hospital- izations	Confirmed deaths
Total	115,318	27,632	3,433
Alabama	2,453/NLU	NR	19
Alaska	1,563	18^{wave 1}	13 (11)
Arizona	8,726	1,897	152
Arkansas	154/NLU	NR	53
California	10,545	8,589	657
Colorado	1,321	578	70
Connecticut	5,491	766	35
Delaware	381	NR	7
District of Columbia	54	NR	1
Florida	3,676	1,227	230
Georgia	1,012	860	81
Hawaii	2,221	NR	13
Idaho	1,171	389^{wave 2}	23^{wave 2}
Illinois	3,387	3,042	111
Indiana	782	NR	39
Iowa	929	700	41
Kansas	1,201	NR	29
Kentucky	2,092	NR	39
Louisiana	1,876	NR	52
Maine	2,232	230	21
Maryland	1,772	996	45
Massachusetts	1,979	397	33
Michigan	655/NLU	NR	88
Minnesota	2,220	1,813	61
Mississippi	1,292	NR	26
Missouri	1,523	NR	17
Montana	961	9	19
Nebraska	430	40	15
Nevada	5,516	NR	44
New Hampshire	722	NR	10
New Jersey	1,006/NLU	512	42
New Mexico	1,007	1,007	58
New York	2,738	909	206
North Carolina	638	267	107
North Dakota	650	60	2
Ohio	227/NLU	NR	52
Oklahoma	237/NLU	7	44
Oregon	1,833	1,419	79
Pennsylvania	10,940	NR	78
Rhode Island	203	76	13
South Carolina	1,634	NR	49
South Dakota	2,081	422	23
Tennessee	1,163	NR	57
Texas	6,128	1,994	231
Utah	988	302	48
Vermont	404	149	3
Virginia	327	NR	37
Washington	1,882	1,561	99
West Virginia	1,214	853	22
Wisconsin	9,579	1,317	55
Wyoming	725	NR	10
American Samoa	90	NR	1
Guam	338	NR	2
Northern Mariana Islands	71	NR	0
Puerto Rico	908	NR	60
U.S. Virgin Islands	80	NR	1
NR: Not Reported - NLU: No Longer Updated

The 2009 flu pandemic in the United States was caused by a novel strain of the Influenza A/H1N1 virus, commonly referred to as "swine flu", that was first detected on April 15, 2009. While the 2009 H1N1 virus strain was commonly referred to as "swine flu", there is no evidence that it is endemic to pigs (i.e. actually a swine flu) or of transmission from pigs to people; instead, the virus spreads from person to person. On April 25, the World Health Organization declared a public health emergency, followed concurringly by the Obama administration on April 26.

The U.S. Centers for Disease Control and Prevention (CDC) reported that during the outbreak about half of all influenza viruses being reported were 2009 H1N1 viruses, with the other half being those of the regular seasonal influenza. Unique to this particular strain, about 60% of the 2009 H1N1 influenza cases were occurring among people between 5 years and 24 years of age, and 40% of the hospitalizations were occurring among children and young adults. About 80% of the deaths were in people younger than 65 years of age. The CDC noted that this differed greatly from typical seasonal influenza epidemics, during which about 70% to 90% of deaths are estimated to occur in people 65 years and older. Antibody studies showed that children had no existing cross-reactive antibody to the 2009 H1N1 influenza virus, while about one-third of adults older than 60 years of age had cross-reactive antibody.

By April 21, 2009, CDC had begun working to develop a virus that could be used to make a vaccine to protect against the new virus. Following preparation for distribution beginning in June, the first doses were administered in October 2009. On August 10, 2010, WHO declared an end to the global 2009 H1N1 influenza pandemic. However, the virus continues to circulate as a seasonal flu virus, and cause illness, hospitalization, and deaths worldwide every year. From April 12, 2009, to April 10, 2010, the CDC estimates there were 60.8 million cases (range: 43.3 - 89.3 million), 274,304 hospitalizations (range: 195,086 - 402,719), and 12,469 deaths (range: 8868 - 18,306) in the United States due to the virus.

A follow-up study done in September 2010 showed that the risk of serious illness resulting from the 2009 H1N1 flu was no higher than that of the yearly seasonal flu. For comparison, the CDC estimates the global H1N1 death toll at 284,000 and the WHO estimates that 250,000 to 500,000 people die of seasonal flu annually.

== History ==
The earliest reported cases in the US began appearing in early April 2009, in California. In late April, the Centers for Disease Control and Prevention (CDC) activated its Emergency Operations Center and declared a public health emergency. On April 25, the World Health Organization (WHO) declared a public health emergency of international concern. WHO declared H1N1 a pandemic on June 11.

By the end of May, the flu had infected people in all 50 states. As of June 16, the total number of confirmed cases was 27,717 and on June 25, the CDC said there were over one million (1,000,000) cases, most of which had not been reported or diagnosed. Deaths relating to influenza began appearing in the US in late April, and by early June, 15 states had reported fatalities related to or directly occurring from the virus.

By October 5, the first doses of an H1N1 vaccine were given in the U.S. The CDC distributed vaccines for the flu using mechanisms already in place for its Vaccines for Children (VFC) program.

On October 24, and the CDC said more than 1,000 had died from the flu. President Obama declared a national emergency. On December 10, 2009, the CDC reported an estimated 50 million Americans or 1 in 6 had been infected and 10,000 had died. On December 23, 2009, the CDC reported a reduction of the disease by 59% percent. On February 12, the CDC reported 57 million Americans had been sickened, 257,000 had been hospitalized and 11,690 people had died (including 1,180 children) due to flu from April through to mid-January.

== Initial cases ==
The Centers for Disease Control and Prevention (CDC) identified the first two A/09(H1N1) swine flu cases in California on April 17, 2009, via the Border Infectious Disease Program, for a San Diego County child, and a naval research facility studying a special diagnostic test, where influenza sample from the child from Imperial County was tested. By April 21, enhanced surveillance was established to search for additional cases in both California and Texas and the CDC determined that the virus strain was genetically similar to the previously known A(H1N1) swine flu circulating among pigs in the United States since about 1999.

It was established that the virus was a combination of human, North American swine, and Eurasian swine influenza viruses; the viruses from the initial two Californian cases were also noted to be resistant to amantadine and rimantadine, two common influenza antiviral drugs. No contact with pigs was found for any of the seven Californian nor either of the two Texas cases, suggesting human-to-human transmission of the virus.

On April 28, 2009, the director of the Centers for Disease Control and Prevention confirmed the first official US death of swine flu. Tests confirmed that a 23-month-old toddler from Mexico, who was probably infected there, died on April 27 from the flu while visiting Texas.

== Outbreak across the US ==
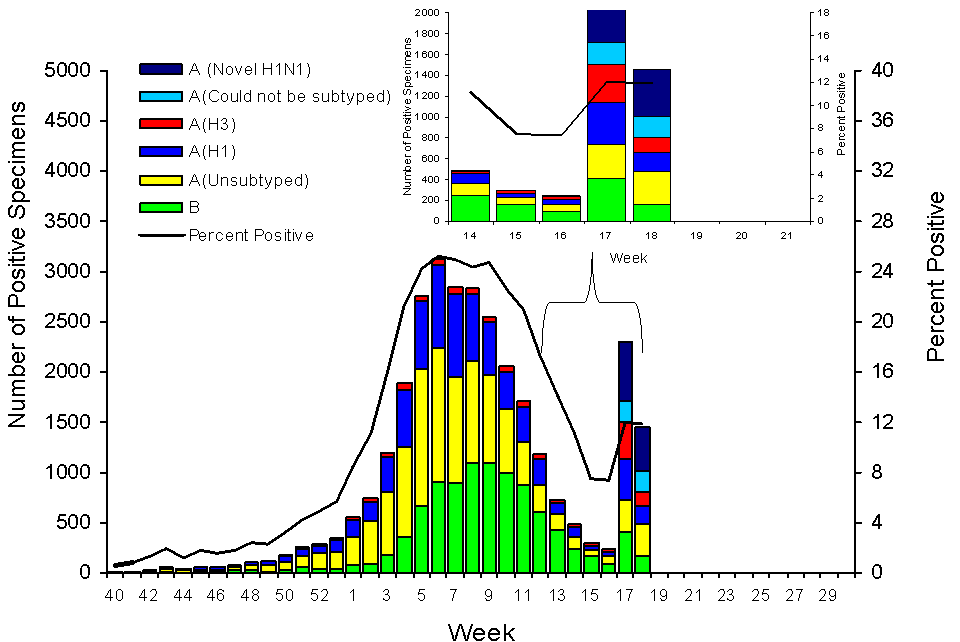
CDC report for the 2008–2009 flu season week 18 (May 17), subtypes and percent positive tests

Cases of H1N1 spread rapidly across the United States, with particularly severe outbreaks in Texas, New York, Utah, and California. Early cases were associated with recent travel to Mexico; many were students who had traveled to Mexico for spring break. On May 4, 2009, the CDC reported one death, 286 confirmed cases of H1N1 flu across 36 states, 35 hospitalizations, and expected H1N1 to eventually spread to all states. A large number of cases, according to medics, have happened in the days that preceded the launch of the alert and came out only in these days due to a massive backlog. By May 5, 2009, the number had risen to 403 and a second death was reported in Texas. The CDC and government officials had expressed cautious optimism about the severity and spread of H1N1.

Changes in surveillance of cases of influenza-like illness, including new guidelines for identifying cases to test, increased laboratory testing, and new test kits able to distinguish this novel strain, resulted in a spike in the percent of cases tested positive for influenza. Of the positive cases, about a third were due to the novel strain. Also found were a substantial number of cases where the strain could not be subtyped.

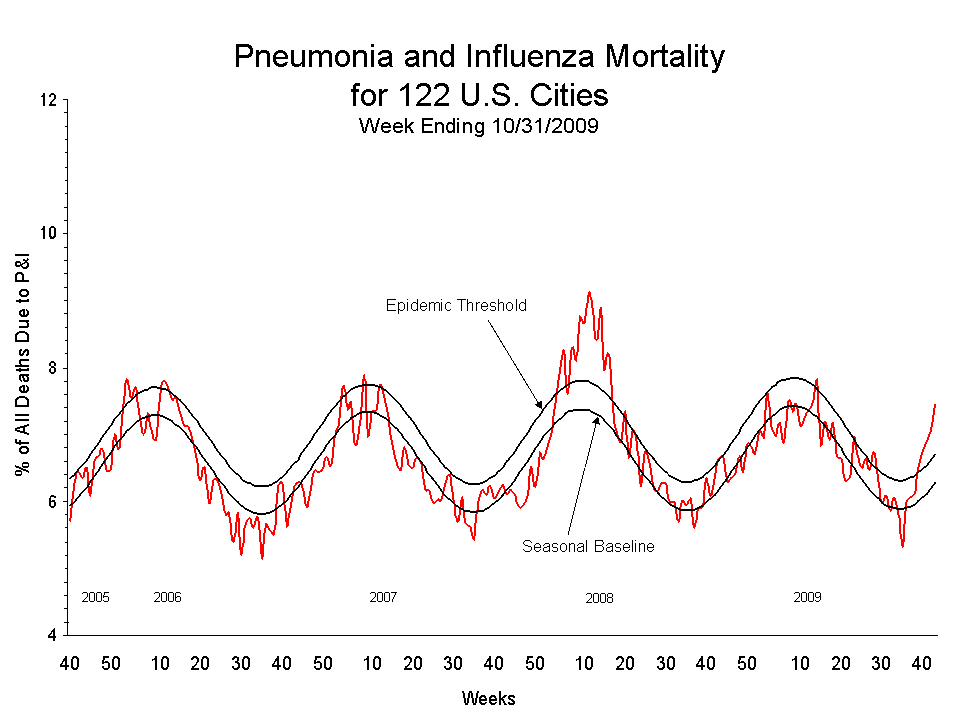
Pneumonia and influenza deaths in 122 US cities, 5 years through October 2009

The proportion of US deaths due to pneumonia and influenza climbed above the epidemic threshold in the 2007–2008 winter flu season but not in the 2008–2009 season. Although the 2009 H1N1 outbreak reached epidemic levels of infection early in 2009, it did not contribute to epidemic levels of pneumonia and influenza related deaths until October 2009.

2009 US Swine Flu Summary	
Number of Confirmed Cases/Deaths	See Table Above
Number of States/Territories with Reported Cases	56
Number of States/Territories with Confirmed Deaths	55
Earliest Confirmed Infection in US	March 28, 2009
First Death Inside the US	April 27, 2009
First Death of US Citizen	May 5, 2009
Number of People Hospitalized	9,079 (as of September 3)
Fatalities	593 (as of September 3)

=== The second wave ===
In early October 2009, the Centers for Disease Control and Prevention announced that swine flu was widespread across the country. It also said there was significant flu activity in virtually all states, which was considered to be quite unusual for this time of year. There was particular worry about pregnant women. As of late August, 100 had been hospitalized in intensive care units and 28 had died since the beginning of the outbreak in April. On October 1, it was acknowledged that a recruit in basic training in Fort Jackson, South Carolina, was the Army's first swine flu death. The recruit fell ill on September 1 and died of pneumonia on September 10.

Dell Children's Medical Center in Austin, Texas, erected two tents in its parking lot to handle emergency room visits, and hospitals around Colorado Springs recorded a 30 percent spike in flu visits. As pediatric cases were increasing, the Dept. of Health and Human Services released 300,000 courses of children's liquid Tamiflu from the national pandemic stockpile in late September, with the first batches sent to Texas and Colorado.

In late September, the disease centers reported that 936 had died of flu symptoms or of flu-associated pneumonia since August 30, when it began a new count of deaths, including some without laboratory-confirmed swine flu.

The Agriculture Department reported on October 16 that three pigs at the Minnesota State Fair, in St. Paul, were tested positive in late August for H1N1 virus, which were the first cases in the country, although infected pigs had been found in eight other countries. There were 103 pigs tested at the Fair, including the three infected, though all appeared healthy. Scientists said the virus was already spreading widely among people, and, in fact, was more common in humans than in pigs, so humans were more likely to catch it from others than from pigs.

In mid-October, it was reported that flu caused by the H1N1 virus was widespread in 41 states, and flu-like illnesses accounted for 6.1 percent of all doctor visits, which was considered high, particularly for October. Forty-three children had died from H1N1 since August 30, which is approximately the number that usually dies in an entire flu season. Nineteen of the forty-three were teenagers while sixteen were between ages five to eleven. The rest were under five. It is reported that the severity of the disease was not increasing. About fifteen to twenty percent of the patients hospitalized for the flu were placed in the intensive care unit, a level similar to that for seasonal flu.

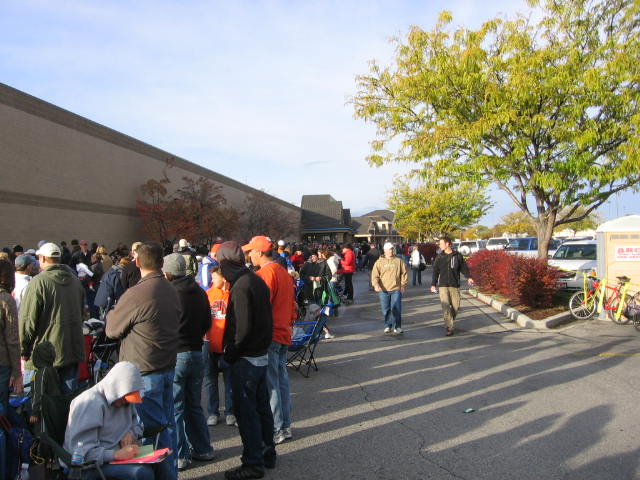
High-risk groups line up at a defunct Kmart on October 24, 2009, for the first H1N1 vaccines publicly available in Boise, Idaho.

Projections of the supply of H1N1 vaccine had decreased significantly from a level of 120 million doses ready in October, estimated during the summer, to an estimate of 28 to 30 million doses by the end of the month. On October 14, 11.4 million doses of the H1N1 vaccine were said to be available. As of November 20, 2009, the CDC reported sharp declines in H1N1 activity throughout the United States, with influenza-like illness (which may also include meningitis, pneumonia, strep pharyngitis, gastroenteritis, and the common cold) accounting for 5.5% of doctors visits, down sharply from 8% in late October, the peak of the second wave. However, taking the vaccine is still urged by the CDC, as a third wave of the disease may sweep across the US, possibly in January/February 2010. As of December 24, the second wave of H1N1 has clearly peaked, with pneumonia and influenza deaths falling below the epidemic threshold for the first time in 11 weeks, and the proportion of doctors visits due to influenza-like illness falling to baseline (2.3%), down from 5.5% 1 month before, on November 20. However, it was reported that influenza activity was beginning to increase in West Virginia, with 5.2% of patients treated by West Virginia health care providers having influenza-like illness, a major increase from 2% of patients treated by West Virginia health care providers having influenza-like illness in November.

On August 10, 2010, WHO declared an end to the global 2009 H1N1 influenza pandemic. However, the virus continues to circulate as a seasonal flu virus, and cause illness, hospitalization, and deaths worldwide every year.

== H1N1 characteristics and severity ==
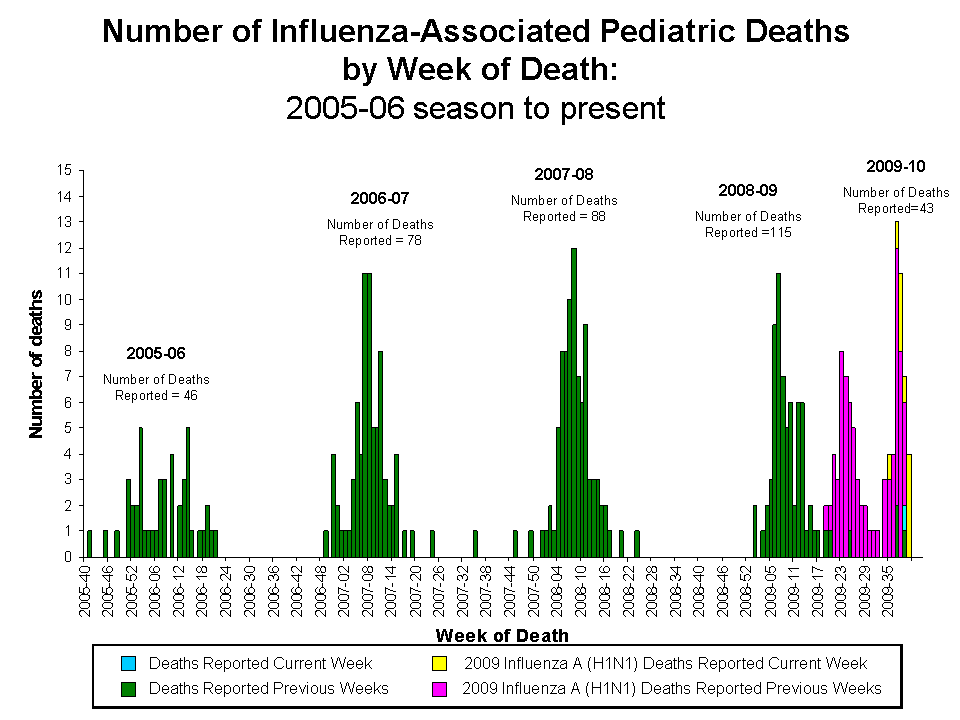
Influenza-associated pediatric deaths reported to CDC, from 2005–06 to start of 2009–2010

The new strain was identified as a combination of several different strains of Influenzavirus A, subtype H1N1, including separate strains of this subtype circulating in humans (see human influenza) and in pigs (see swine influenza). The strain transmits between humans and was initially reported to have a relatively high mortality rate in Mexico. In April 2009 the World Health Organization (WHO) and the U.S. Centers for Disease Control and Prevention (CDC) expressed serious concerns that the new strain had the potential to become an influenza pandemic. On April 25 it was reported that, because the virus was already widespread, containment would be "nearly impossible."

By this time, there had also been speculation that the flu death toll in Mexico could be lower than first thought. Gerald Evans, head of the Association of Medical Microbiology and Infectious Disease Canada and a member of a federal pandemic-planning committee, said on April 29:

There was a lot of speculation and what seemed to be evidence there were dozens and dozens of deaths. Careful analysis showed these people likely died of something else, and not influenza. That's really good news, and that would fit with what we've seen outside of Mexico.

Another Canadian expert, Neil Rau, criticized the WHO's decision to raise its pandemic alert to level 5, saying:

I don't agree with (the WHO) because I think it's a panic metre, not a pandemic metre. [...] If that flu-like illness is not deadly, I don't know what the cause for alarm is for people who are not really sickened by this virus. [...] I'm really eager to know how much worse this is than seasonal flu. So far it's looking like it's not that serious.

CNN noted on April 28, 2009, that in any individual week between January 1 and April 18, there had been at least 800 deaths in the U.S. due to normal influenza, which is higher than the 150 total deaths worldwide from the swine flu up to that time.

As of May 28, 2010, the official U.S. death toll attributed directly to the novel H1N1 and seasonal influenza was 2,117. This total exceeds the 849 U.S. deaths directly attributed to seasonal influenza in 2006. Many of the other deaths commonly attributed to influenza are caused by complicated influenza, where a second infection causes death, usually pneumonia (of which 48,657 of 55,477 official deaths in 2006 occurred in people aged 65 years and older). The final estimate was of over 12,000 deaths throughout the pandemic (April 2009 – April 2010).

=== H1N1 unique characteristics ===
The CDC reported that during the outbreak about half of all influenza viruses being detected through laboratory reports were 2009 H1N1 viruses, with the other half being those of the regular seasonal influenza viruses. Surveillance reports indicated that about 57% of the 2009 H1N1 influenza confirmed and probable cases were occurring among people between 5 years and 24 years of age, and 41% of the hospitalizations were occurring among older children and young adults. The highest rates of hospitalization were among children younger than 5 years of age; the next highest hospitalization rate was in people 5 years to 24 years of age. Antibody studies showed that children had no existing cross-reactive antibody to the 2009 H1N1 influenza virus, while about one-third of adults older than 60 years of age had cross-reactive antibody. One possible explanation for this pre-existing antibody in older adults was that they may have had previous exposure, either through infection or vaccination, to an influenza A H1N1 virus that was more closely related to the 2009 H1N1 flu virus.

Based on data from previous influenza pandemics and seasonal influenza, pregnant women had been recognized as a high-risk group early in the outbreak. People with other previously recognized medical conditions that placed them at high risk of complications from seasonal influenza also appeared to be at increased risk of complications from 2009 H1N1 influenza. One report found that seventy-one percent of hospitalized patients had one or more underlying chronic medical conditions and reported deaths had occurred in people ranging in age from 22 months old to 57 years old. Also, only 13% of hospitalizations had occurred in people 50 years and older, and there were few cases and no deaths in people older than 65 years, which was unusual when compared with seasonal flu.

== Response ==
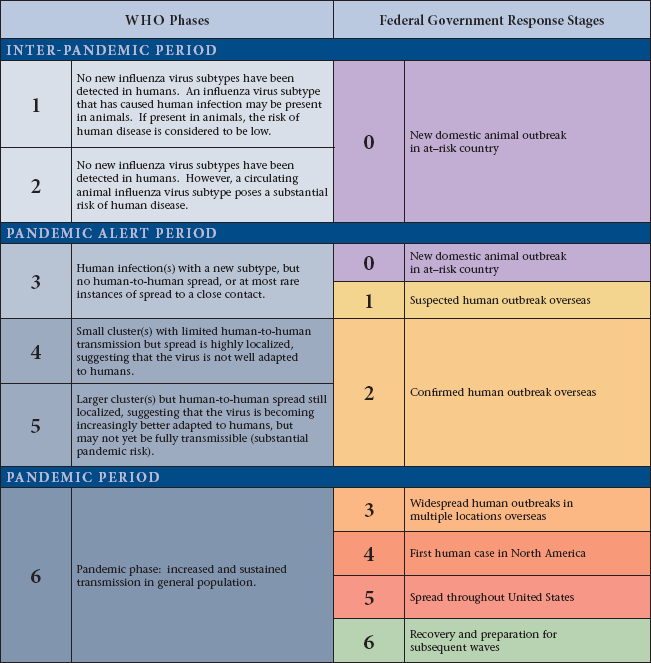
Congruent U.S. Government and WHO Pandemic Response Charts.

The Federal response remained at US Pandemic Stage 0, congruent with the World Health Organization (WHO) Pandemic Phases 1, 2 and 3; however, the WHO's Pandemic Phase was raised to 4 on April 27, which is congruent with US Pandemic Stage 2. On April 29, the WHO raised the pandemic alert level to phase 5.

The United States federal government declared a public health emergency, and several U.S. states then indicated that they may follow suit. Secretary of Homeland Security Janet Napolitano noted that this declaration was standard operating procedure, which was also done for the 2009 presidential inauguration and for flooding.

After many days of deliberation the WHO declared that the current influenza had become a true pandemic, raising the Pandemic Alert level to Phase 6, the highest on the WHO scale and congruent with U.S. Federal Government Response Stages 3–6.

=== Obama administration reactions ===
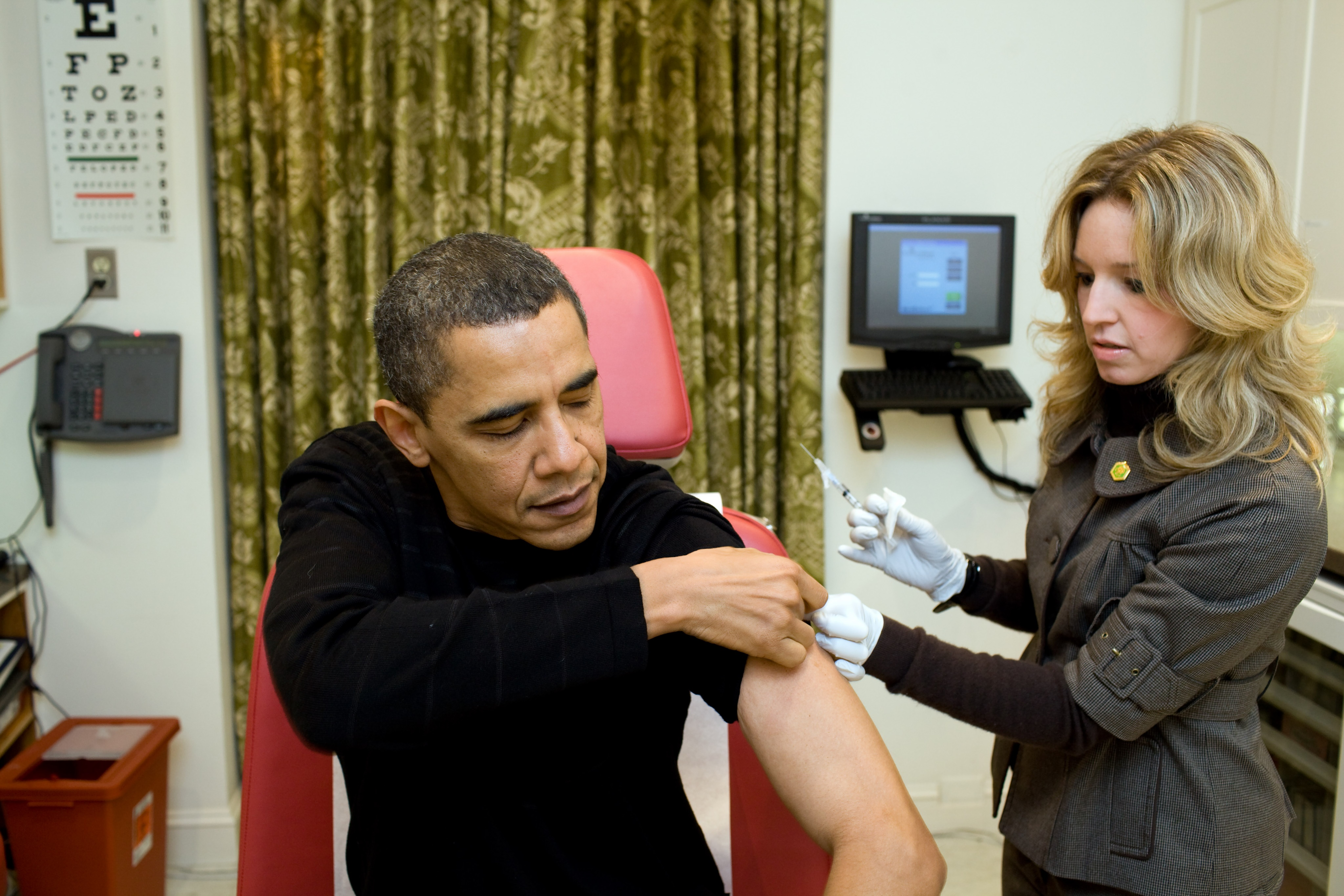
Barack Obama being vaccinated on Dec. 20, 2009.

An official for the White House said on April 24 that "the White House is taking the situation seriously and monitoring for any new developments. The president has been fully briefed." President Barack Obama stated that "We are closely monitoring the emerging cases of swine flu." He also noted, "This is obviously a cause for concern ... but it is not a cause for alarm." Obama suggested that U.S. schools should consider shutting down, as a future possibility, if their students were to become infected. White House Press Secretary Robert Gibbs said the effort to get a team in place to respond to the health scare had not been hindered by the lack of a secretary of Health and Human Services or appointees in any of the department's 19 key posts. The president's nominee, Kansas Gov. Kathleen Sebelius, was still awaiting confirmation from the U.S. Senate until passing on April 28. The President had not yet made appointments to either the Commissioner of the Food and Drug Administration, the Surgeon General, or the Director of the Centers for Disease Control and Prevention. The current acting Surgeon General, Steven K. Galson, was also currently serving as the Acting Assistant Secretary for Health.

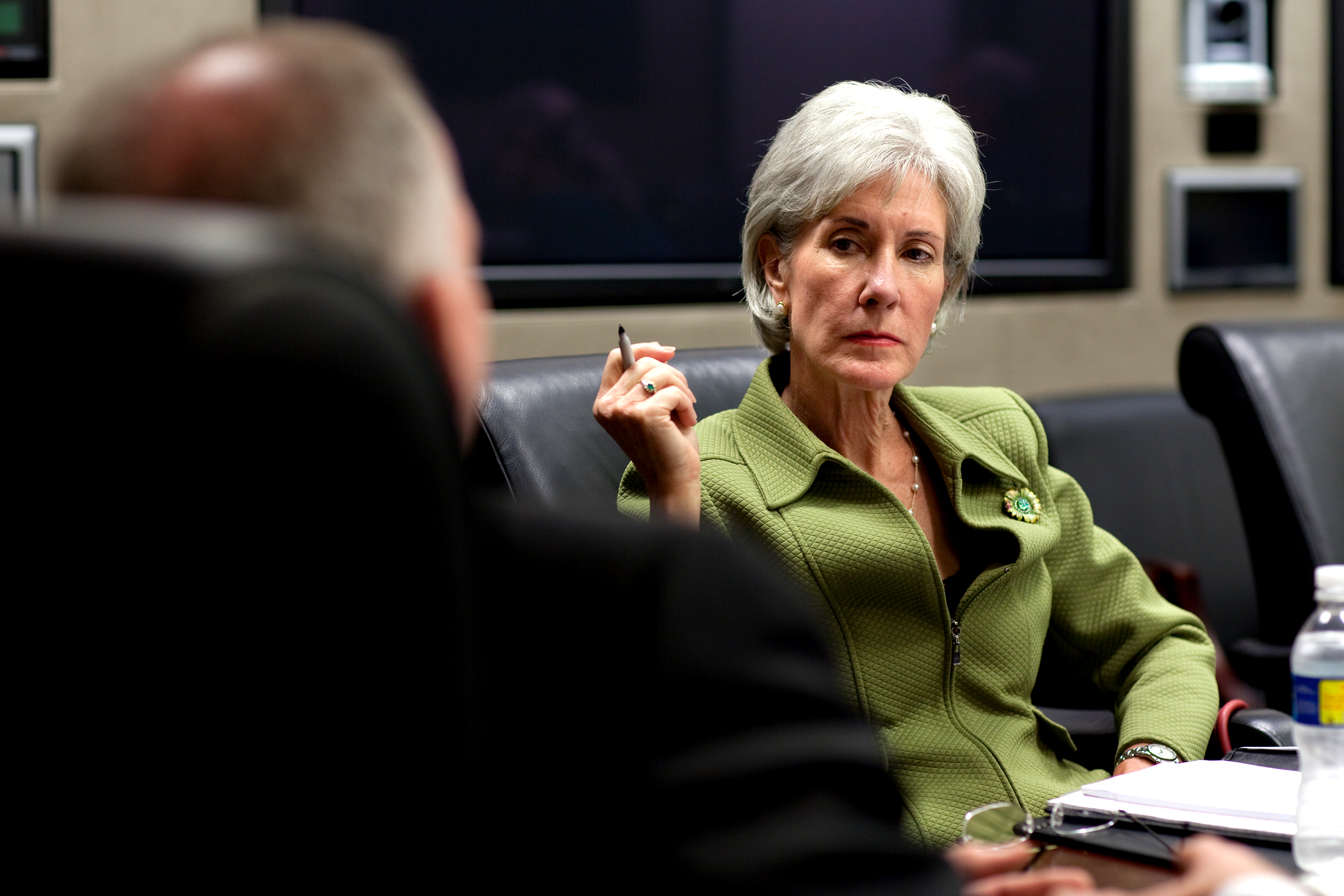
Health and Human Services Secretary Kathleen Sebelius in a meeting in the Situation Room of the White House regarding the H1N1 virus.

On April 30, it was reported that an aide to Steven Chu, the US Energy Secretary, had fallen ill from the virus after helping arrange President Obama's trip to Mexico. However, the White House stated that the President was not at risk of contracting the flu. Kathleen Sebelius was confirmed as the Secretary of Health and Human Services by the Senate on April 28, 2009, with a vote of 65–31.

On October 24, President Obama declared the 2009 H1N1 swine flu a national emergency. The declaration made it easier for U.S. medical facilities to handle a surge in flu patients by allowing the waiver of some requirements of Medicare, Medicaid and other federal health insurance programs as needed.

=== Centers for Disease Control and Prevention (CDC) ===
In this video, Joe Bresee, with CDC's Influenza Division, describes the symptoms of swine flu and warning signs to look for that indicate the need for urgent medical attention. See also this video with subtitles: Video on YouTube

==== Activation of Emergency Operations Center ====
During the week of April 19, 2009, the CDC activated its Emergency Operations Center (EOC), with RADM Stephen Redd as the Incident Commander, to augment the ongoing investigation of human cases of swine influenza A (H1N1). More than 250 CDC professionals worked from the CDC EOC as part of the agency's response. As of May 4, 2009, the CDC reported that it had deployed 25% of the supplies and medicines in the Strategic National Stockpile to the various states.

==== Swine flu test kits ====
As of April 29, only the CDC could confirm U.S. swine flu cases. Besser stated during an April 30 press briefing that California and New York had diagnostic test kits, and that the kits would be sent to all states starting the following day. On May 6, the CDC announced that testing kits were now available for all states. It was expected this would generate an increase in the number of confirmed cases as more states began doing their own tests.

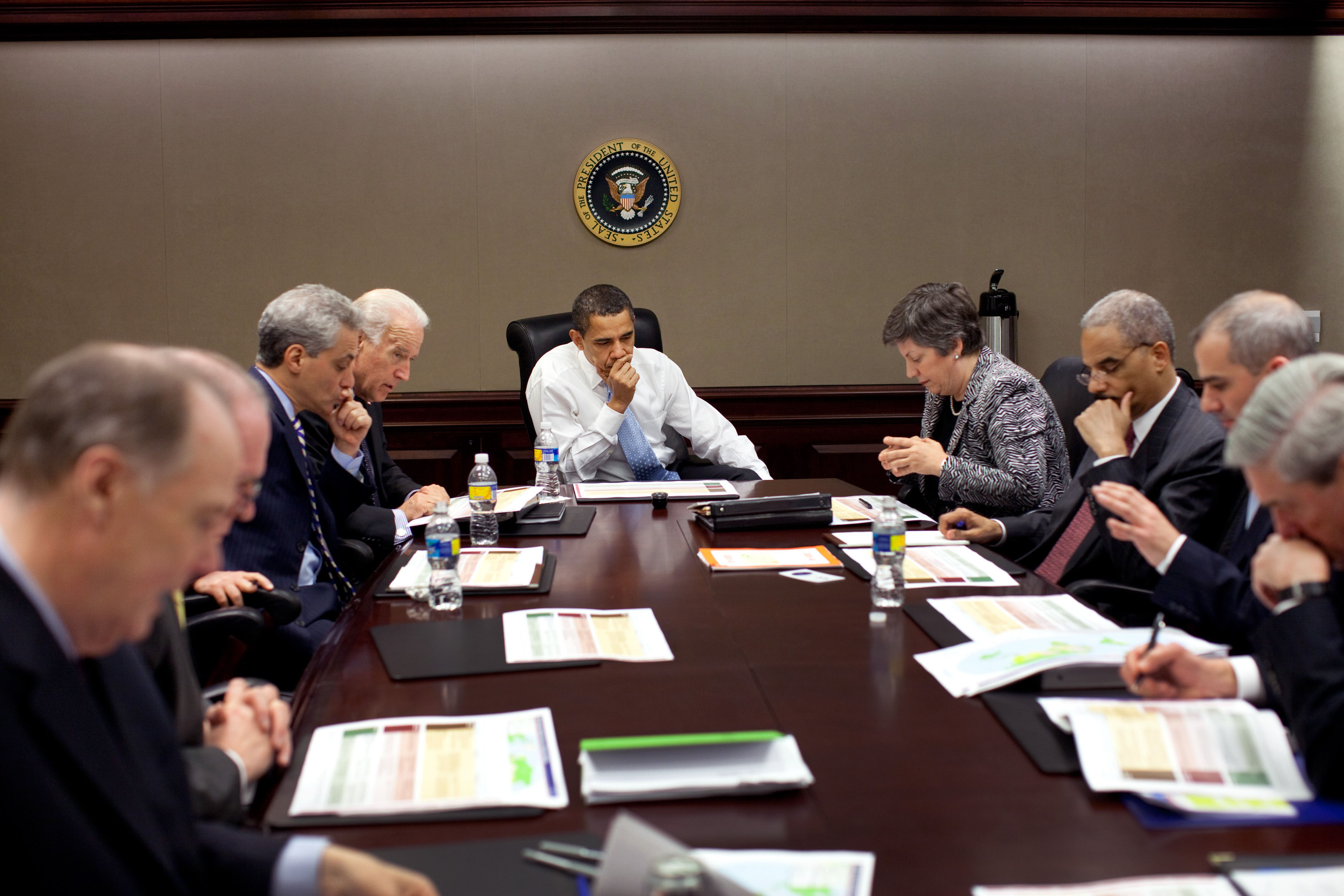
President Obama is briefed in the Situation Room about the swine flu outbreak.

==== Influenza reporting requirements ====
In the United States, the majority of the 70 National Respiratory and Enteric Virus Surveillance System (NREVSS) laboratories do not report the influenza A subtype.

However, in 2007, human infection with a novel influenzavirus A became a nationally notifiable condition. Novel influenza A virus infections include all human infections with influenza A viruses that are different from currently circulating human influenza H1 and H3 viruses. These viruses include those that are subtyped as nonhuman in origin and those that are unsubtypable with standard methods and reagents. The new strain responsible for this outbreak was one such virus.

==== Recommendations for schools ====
Initially the CDC had issued a recommendation that schools close for as long as two weeks if a student catches swine flu. Some school districts closed all schools if a single child was classified as probable. On May 5 the CDC retracted its advice stating that schools that were closed based on previous CDC guidance related to this outbreak may reopen. By that time at least 726 schools nationwide serving more than 480,000 students had closed for at least some period of time. The CDC amended its advice, citing new information on disease severity and the limiting effectiveness of school closure as a control measure. The new advice given stated, "Decisions about school closure should be at the discretion of local authorities based on local considerations, including public concern and the impact of school absenteeism and staffing shortages."

=== Food and Drug Administration ===
The Food and Drug Administration (FDA) authorized emergency use of medicines and diagnostic tests for flu. (FDA is part of Department of Health and Human Services.) The FDA stated it was also responding to this threat by:

- working with other government agencies and manufacturers on a series of issues related to antiviral medications.
- growing the 2009 H1N1 flu virus and preparing to make vaccine seed lots, which may be used eventually to produce a safe and effective vaccine.
- helping to prepare reagents needed for vaccine production and coordinating closely with other public health agencies for clinical development and testing.
- accelerating access to new diagnostic tools for this 2009 H1N1 flu virus

On May 6, 2009, the FDA announced that it had approved a new manufacturing facility for seasonal flu vaccine, owned by Sanofi Pasteur, which could also be used for manufacturing a vaccine for the new H1N1 flu strain. The FDA also issued a warning for consumers to be wary of products claiming to cure or prevent swine flu.

=== Other federal agencies ===
==== Department of Homeland Security ====
Secretary Napolitano stated that DHS was the principal federal office for incidents such as the H1N1 flu outbreak, and "Under that role, we have been leading a true collaborative effort." The Department of Homeland Security issued a document, dated November 1, 2005, entitled "National Strategy for Pandemic Influenza", detailing planning for potential pandemics. https://web.archive.org/web/20090507013213/http://www.pandemicflu.gov/plan/federal/pandemic-influenza.pdf

==== State Department ====
The State Department suggested travelers to Mexico stay alert and comply with guidance from Mexican public health officials, but did not impose any travel restrictions on US citizens to Mexico. However, the State Department did recommend US citizens avoid non-essential travel to Mexico.

==== Department of Agriculture ====
The Department of Agriculture (USDA) reported no swine in the US have been infected so far, but the USDA is monitoring swine across the US for signs of infection.

==== Department of Commerce ====
The Department of Commerce sent a letter to Russia and China requesting that those countries lift their ban on American pork products.

==== Department of Defense ====
The Department of Defense (DOD) monitored the swine flu situation and had contingency plans to deal with such outbreaks. As of May 7, 2009, the DOD reported 104 confirmed cases among Armed Forces personnel and their families. DOD maintained a daily summary and map.

==== Department of Education ====
The Department of Education provided guidance to schools in the US affected by swine flu, as well as precautions to take.

=== State and local ===
Schools closed in many states in response to local flu outbreaks. By April 30, 2009, 300 U.S. schools and school districts had announced closures in response to the outbreak, giving 169,000 students time off. On May 4, 2009, about 533 schools in 24 states in the U.S. were closed, affecting about 330,000 students. On September 25, 2009, 42 schools were closed in eight states as the second wave of the pandemic began.

On May 5, Kathleen Sebelius stated in a CDC news conference that school closures for single confirmed cases of H1N1 influenza were unnecessary, but that children displaying an influenza-like illness should stay home.

=== Travel industry ===
Several US airlines waived fees for cancellations and flight changes. At least one cruise line changed itinerary to avoid Mexican ports of call.

== Summary ==
2009	A(H1N1) Outbreak and pandemic milestones
28 March	(United States) First case in the US of what would later be identified as swine flu origin.
21 April	First case confirmed in California.
23 April	First case confirmed in Texas.
25 April	First case confirmed in Kansas.
25 April	Community outbreaks confirmed in the United States.
26 April	(New York (state)) First case confirmed in New York.
26 April	First case confirmed in Ohio.
26 April	Acting HHS Secretary Charles E. Johnson declares 2009 H1N1 a public health emergency
28 April	First case confirmed in Indiana.
29 April	First non-US citizen death confirmed in Texas.
29 April	First case confirmed in Nevada.
29 April	First case confirmed in Arizona.
29 April	First case confirmed in Maine.
29 April	First case confirmed in Massachusetts.
29 April	First case confirmed in Michigan.
30 April	First case confirmed in Nebraska.
30 April	First case confirmed in South Carolina.
30 April	First case confirmed in Minnesota.
30 April	First case confirmed in Colorado.
30 April	First case confirmed in Virginia.
30 April	First case confirmed in Kentucky.
30 April	First case confirmed in New Jersey.
1 May	First case confirmed in Florida.
1 May	First case confirmed in Missouri.
1 May	First case confirmed in Connecticut.
1 May	First case confirmed in Delaware.
2 May	First case confirmed in New Mexico.
2 May	First case confirmed in Utah.
2 May	First case confirmed in New Hampshire.
2 May	First case confirmed in Rhode Island.
2 May	First case confirmed in Iowa.
2 May	First case confirmed in Wisconsin.
2 May	First case confirmed in Alabama.
3 May	First case confirmed in Idaho.
3 May	First case confirmed in Pennsylvania.
3 May	First case confirmed in Louisiana.
3 May	First case confirmed in North Carolina.
3 May	First case confirmed in Tennessee.
4 May	First case confirmed in Oregon.
4 May	(Georgia (U.S. state)) First case confirmed in Georgia.
4 May	First case confirmed in Maryland.
5 May	(Washington (state)) First case confirmed in Washington.
5 May	First case confirmed in Oklahoma.
5 May	First case confirmed in Hawaii.
5 May	First US citizen death confirmed in Texas.
6 May	(Washington, D.C.) First case confirmed in District of Columbia.
7 May	First case confirmed in South Dakota.
8 May	First case confirmed in Vermont.
8 May	First case confirmed in Arkansas.
9 May	(Washington (state)) First death confirmed in Washington.
11 May	First case confirmed in Montana.
13 May	First case confirmed in North Dakota.
14 May	First death confirmed in Arizona.
15 May	First case confirmed in Mississippi.
17 May	(New York (state)) First death confirmed in New York.
19 May	First death confirmed in Missouri.
20 May	First death confirmed in Utah.
25 May	First death confirmed in Illinois.
26 May	First case confirmed in Puerto Rico.
27 May	First case confirmed in Wyoming.
27 May	First case confirmed in Alaska.
2 June	First case confirmed in West Virginia. All 50 states have confirmed H1N1.
2 June	First death confirmed in Virginia.
3 June	First death confirmed in Michigan.
3 June	First death confirmed in Connecticut.
4 June	First death confirmed in California.
5 June	First death confirmed in Pennsylvania.
5 June	First death confirmed in Wisconsin.
8 June	First death confirmed in Oregon.
8 June	First death confirmed in Oklahoma.
15 June	First death confirmed in New Jersey.
15 June	First death confirmed in Massachusetts.
15 June	First death confirmed in Minnesota.
16 June	First death confirmed in Florida.
16 June	First death confirmed in Rhode Island.
16 June	(United States Virgin Islands) First case confirmed in US Virgin Islands.
23 June	First death confirmed in Maryland.
24 June	First death confirmed in North Carolina.
26 June	First case confirmed in American Samoa.
29 June	First death confirmed in Hawaii.
1 July	First case confirmed in Guam.
6 July	First death confirmed in Ohio.
6 July	First death confirmed in Nevada.
10 July	First death confirmed in Indiana.
10 July	(Georgia (U.S. state)) First death confirmed in Georgia.
15 July	First death confirmed in Nebraska.
15 July	First death confirmed in Tennessee.
20 July	First death confirmed in Guam.
21 July	First case confirmed in Northern Mariana Islands.
27 July	First death confirmed in Alaska.
29 July	First death confirmed in Alabama.
29 July	First death confirmed in Colorado.
3 August	First death confirmed in Iowa.
6 August	First death confirmed in Kansas.
6 August	First death confirmed in Montana.
6 August	First death confirmed in Mississippi.
8 August	First death confirmed in Arkansas.
10 August	First death confirmed in New Mexico.
13 August	First death confirmed in Maine.
13 August	First death confirmed in Louisiana.
14 August	(United States) First case of Oseltamivir (Tamiflu) resistance confirmed.
17 August	First death confirmed in New Hampshire.
19 August	First death confirmed in Wyoming.
28 August	First death confirmed in South Carolina.
2 September	(United States Virgin Islands) First death confirmed in US Virgin Islands.
3 September	First death confirmed in Kentucky.
4 September	First death confirmed in West Virginia.
10 September	(United States) First Oseltamivir (Tamiflu) resistance spread from person to person confirmed.
28 September	First death confirmed in Idaho.
2 October	First death confirmed in South Dakota.
22 October	First death confirmed in Delaware.
26 October	First death confirmed in North Dakota.
28 October	President Obama declares H1N1 a National Emergency.
28 October	First death confirmed in Vermont. All 50 states have confirmed H1N1 deaths.
4 November	First feline zoonosis confirmed in Iowa.
19 November	First death confirmed in American Samoa.
19 November	First feline death confirmed in Oregon.
24 November	First double infection case confirmed in West Virginia.

== See also ==
- COVID-19 pandemic in the United States
- Spanish flu
