= 2009 swine flu pandemic in the United States by state =

Reported cases by state/territory
State or territory	State-reported confirmed cases	State-reported hospital- izations	Confirmed deaths
Total	115,318	27,632	3,433
Alabama	2,453/NLU	NR	19
Alaska	1,563	18^{wave 1}	13 (11)
Arizona	8,726	1,897	152
Arkansas	154/NLU	NR	53
California	10,545	8,589	657
Colorado	1,321	578	70
Connecticut	5,491	766	35
Delaware	381	NR	7
District of Columbia	54	NR	1
Florida	3,676	1,227	230
Georgia	1,012	860	81
Hawaii	2,221	NR	13
Idaho	1,171	389^{wave 2}	23^{wave 2}
Illinois	3,387	3,042	111
Indiana	782	NR	39
Iowa	929	700	41
Kansas	1,201	NR	29
Kentucky	2,092	NR	39
Louisiana	1,876	NR	52
Maine	2,232	230	21
Maryland	1,772	996	45
Massachusetts	1,979	397	33
Michigan	655/NLU	NR	88
Minnesota	2,220	1,813	61
Mississippi	1,292	NR	26
Missouri	1,523	NR	17
Montana	961	9	19
Nebraska	430	40	15
Nevada	5,516	NR	44
New Hampshire	722	NR	10
New Jersey	1,006/NLU	512	42
New Mexico	1,007	1,007	58
New York	2,738	909	206
North Carolina	638	267	107
North Dakota	650	60	2
Ohio	227/NLU	NR	52
Oklahoma	237/NLU	7	44
Oregon	1,833	1,419	79
Pennsylvania	10,940	NR	78
Rhode Island	203	76	13
South Carolina	1,634	NR	49
South Dakota	2,081	422	23
Tennessee	1,163	NR	57
Texas	6,128	1,994	231
Utah	988	302	48
Vermont	404	149	3
Virginia	327	NR	37
Washington	1,882	1,561	99
West Virginia	1,214	853	22
Wisconsin	9,579	1,317	55
Wyoming	725	NR	10
American Samoa	90	NR	1
Guam	338	NR	2
Northern Mariana Islands	71	NR	0
Puerto Rico	908	NR	60
U.S. Virgin Islands	80	NR	1
NR: Not Reported - NLU: No Longer Updated

The United States experienced the beginnings of a pandemic of a novel strain of the influenza A/H1N1 virus, commonly referred to as "swine flu", in the spring of 2009. The earliest reported cases in the US began appearing in late March 2009 in California, then spreading to infect people in Texas, New York, and other states by mid-April. Early cases were associated with recent travel to Mexico; many were students who had traveled to Mexico for Spring Break. This spread continued across the country's population and by the end of May there were approximately 0 confirmed cases throughout all 50 states.

On April 28, 2009, the director of the Centers for Disease Control and Prevention (CDC) confirmed the first official US death of swine flu, a 23-month-old toddler from Mexico who died on April 27 while visiting Texas. By June 24, 132 deaths had been attributed to the virus. As of January 11, 2010, at least 554,000 deaths were attributed to the virus worldwide, and at least 12,469 deaths in the US were confirmed to be due to the virus. The CDC suspects, however, that the total number of deaths in the US is much higher than the official total, as some deaths probably went unconfirmed.

== Alabama ==
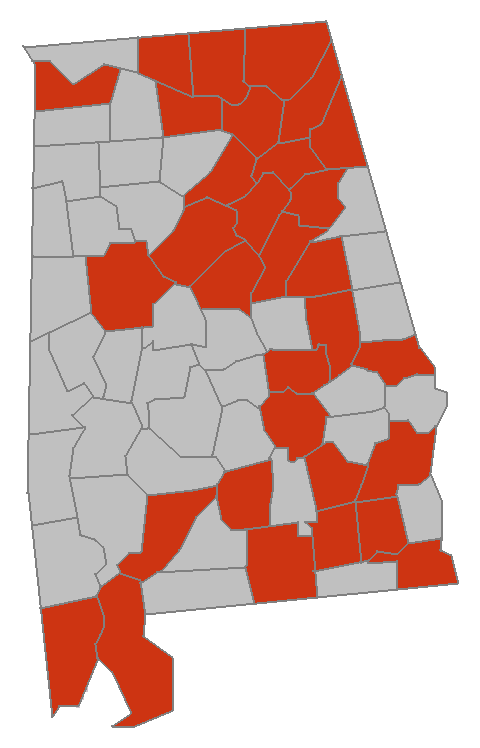
Alabama As of July 21, 2009: Case(s) confirmed

On May 2, 2009, the Alabama Department of Public Health confirmed the first case of H1N1 (swine flu) in Madison, Alabama, one of two probable cases previously identified at an elementary school in Madison. As a result, all public schools and most private schools and daycare centers in Madison County, Alabama, including the cities of Huntsville and Madison, closed for two days. After meeting with the state public health officer on May 3, 2009, all Madison city elementary schools were to be closed through May 13, 2009, but were reopened after the CDC updated its guidance to schools.

As of December 5, 2009, the Alabama Department of Public Health reports 2453 confirmed and 36 deaths from swine flu. As of January 9, 2010, Alabama was the only US state reporting widespread A/H1N1 flu activity.

== Alaska ==
On May 10, 2009, the Alaska state Division of Public Health reported the state's first probable case of swine flu in a crew member of a Royal Caribbean cruise ship traveling in Alaska waters. On May 12, they confirmed that the woman had been infected with swine flu but they do not consider it to be Alaska's first case because she became ill before entering state waters.

As of December 5, 460 cases of swine flu and 11 deaths were confirmed in Alaska. On July 27, Alaska health officials confirmed the first H1N1-related death.

== Arizona ==
As of October 31, the Arizona Department of Health Services had reported a total of 6,302 confirmed cases of H1N1 infection since April 2009, with at least one case reported in each of the state's 15 counties. 786 of the cases had resulted in hospitalization of the patient, and 81 deaths were associated with H1N1 infection in that period of time. Of the H1N1 associated deaths reported in the state, 72% suffered an underlying medical condition (asthma, lung or heart conditions, cancer, metabolic disorders, pregnancy, immunosuppressive disorders, neurologic diseases or other chronic diseases) at the time of death.

On April 28, the first cases of H1N1 influenza infection in Arizona were confirmed in four school-aged patients in the Phoenix metropolitan area. The schools attended by the patients were immediately closed following recommendations from the CDC; after only 3 days, however, local authorities reopened the schools, stating that the H1N1 flu appeared to be no more deadly than the seasonal flu. School closures in the area have since been eliminated in favor of simply sending the infected children home, resulting in slightly elevated absence rates statewide. The first death in the state due to H1N1 swine flu complications was reported by the Maricopa County Department of Public Health on May 14. As of January 15, Arizona has reported 142 deaths due to confirmed A/H1N1 influenza, including at least 2 in 2010 alone.

== Arkansas ==
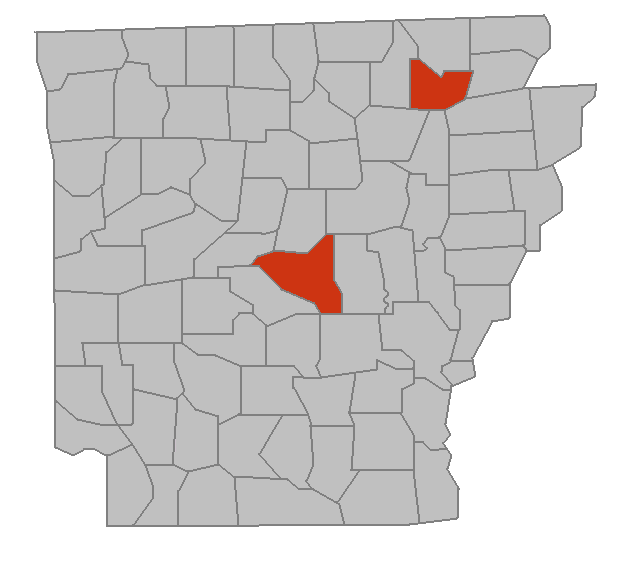
Arkansas As of July 21, 2009: Case(s) confirmed

During the 2009–2010 flu season, the Arkansas Department of Health reported 53 confirmed cases of swine flu. Four of the cases were from Camp Robinson, a US Army National Guard base in North Little Rock, Pulaski County.

== California ==
Deaths by county:

- Alameda – 33
- Berkeley City – 1
- Butte – 3
- Calaveras – 5
- Contra Costa – 15
- El Dorado – 1
- Fresno – 22
- Humboldt – 4
- Imperial – 2
- Kern – 22
- Kings – 3
- Lake – 1
- Long Beach City – 7
- Los Angeles – 149
- Madera – 4
- Marin – 5
- Mendocino – 4
- Merced – 5
- Monterey – 4
- Napa – 1
- Nevada – 1
- Orange – 56
- Placer – 5
- Riverside – 40
- Sacramento – 22
- San Benito – 1
- San Bernardino – 43
- San Diego – 63
- San Francisco – 8
- San Joaquin – 13
- San Luis Obispo – 3
- San Mateo – 11
- Santa Barbara – 9
- Santa Clara – 21
- Santa Cruz – 3
- Shasta – 2
- Solano – 8
- Sonoma – 11
- Stanislaus – 13
- Tehama – 2
- Trinity – 1
- Tulare – 6
- Tuolumne – 1
- Ventura – 14
- Yolo – 6
- Yuba – 3
- Total – 657

As of July 14, 2009: Death(s) confirmed Case(s) confirmed Case(s) unconfirmed (both suspected and probable cases)

CDC conference with the media on the swine flu outbreak on April 25, 2009

The first two cases detected in the US were two children living in San Diego County and Imperial County who became ill on March 28 and 30 respectively. A CDC alert concerning these two isolated cases was reported in the media on April 21. As of April 24 eight human cases were known in the US, including six in Southern California. The patients have recovered. The acting director of the US Centers for Disease Control (CDC) said that preliminary tests on seven out of fourteen samples from patients in Mexico had matched the virus found in the US, which experts say is a new strain of swine flu. None of the US patients had any contact with pigs, leading CDC officials to believe that human-to-human transmission has been occurring.

Gov. Arnold Schwarzenegger and the state of California activated the Joint Emergency Operations Center of the Department of Public Health, and are coordinating with the California Emergency Management Agency, the CDC, and the Mexican government. They have additionally stepped up other preparations to lessen the flu's threat. On April 28, Gov. Schwarzenegger declared a state of emergency which allows the state to deploy additional resources to the Department of Public Health and more quickly and easily purchase equipment and materials.

St. Mels Catholic School in Fair Oaks was closed after Sacramento County Health Department notified the school that a 7th grade student who reportedly recently returned from a family vacation in Mexico tested positive for an unidentified strain of influenza virus A. On April 27, CDC officials confirmed that the student tested positive for swine flu. In Marin County, a grandmother and her 20-month-old granddaughter have been confirmed to have the flu. By April 28, the CDC had confirmed 10 cases of swine flu in California.

California State University, Long Beach reported on April 29 that a student had returned a "probable positive" test result for swine influenza. The student showed symptoms on Sunday April 26 and went to the campus health services office the following day. The test results were received by the school on April 28 and distributed to all students and faculty. The affected student had not attended any classes since falling ill and has an apparently mild case of the disease that does not appear life-threatening. Three high schools in Riverside County were closed April 29 after two teenage girls, from Corona and Indio respectively, were confirmed to have contracted the virus. Branham High School in San Jose was closed that day for a week after one teenage girl was confirmed to be a probable case. Rucker Elementary School in Gilroy is set to be closed on Friday, May 1 after at least one student was being tested after exhibiting flu-like symptoms. Three students at the Grizzly Youth Academy in San Luis Obispo are confirmed cases of swine influenza. As many as 73 students are exhibiting flu-like symptoms at The academy and are assumed to have the virus. All are being isolated. The academy is set to stay open. On May 3, 2009, parent of students attending King Middle School in Berkeley were notified that their school would be closed down due to a swine flu outbreak involving students at the school. Days later, other schools were closed down because of students or staff exhibiting flu-like symptoms; for example, Sunnyside Elementary School and Woodville Elementary School, both in Tulare County.

On June 1, 2009, the first two deaths were confirmed, one by a middle-aged man in San Bernardino County, and another one by a middle-aged woman in Los Angeles County. A third death was confirmed on June 4, when a nine-year-old girl from Contra Costa County died. They were followed by an Orange County man's death on June 8 and a middle-aged man's death in Alameda County on June 9. As of June 9, there were 973 confirmed cases, 266 probable cases, and five deaths caused by the H1N1 flu. On June 10, another middle-aged man died in Alameda County, thus making it the third death in the San Francisco Bay Area.

On July 1, a woman who had been hospitalized in Marin County died of swine flu.

As of July 23, 2009, 2,655 cases and 61 deaths in California had been confirmed.

A list of hospitalizations and deaths can be viewed at the California Department of Health Website.

As of mid-September 2009, California had 2,655 cases and 152 deaths. As of January 15, at least 479 California residents had died from confirmed H1N1 infection.

== Colorado ==
On April 30 two cases of the flu virus were confirmed in the state of Colorado. The confirmed cases were a woman from Arapahoe County who recently returned from a cruise to Mexico and a Denver International Airport baggage handler. Two more H1N1 influenza cases were confirmed on May 2, both in Jefferson County, Colorado. One case is a middle school student, which has caused the school he attends to close for a week. The tally increased to seven on May 4 when The University of Colorado at Boulder (CU) confirmed three of its students contracted the virus.

There were 171 cases reported in Colorado as of July 18. On July 29, 2009, Colorado reported its first A(H1N1) swine flu death in El Paso County of a woman in her forties.

== Connecticut ==
On April 28, it was announced that there were suspected cases of swine flu in three Connecticut towns. Schools were closed due to suspected cases in East Haddam and Wethersfield, though tests on these patients later came back negative. On April 30, two students at Fairfield University were announced as having "probable" swine flu, in addition to another person in Glastonbury, bringing the total number of likely cases to 6. On May 1, the first confirmed case of swine flu was reported in Connecticut in Stratford. On May 2, the second confirmed case was reported in a child from Middlefield that had recently returned from a family trip to Mexico. On May 5, Fairfield University announced that two "probable" cases had tested positive for the H1N1 flu, with five other "probable" cases awaiting test results. One May 8, Fairfield announced that those five students had also tested positive, although the students by that time were nearly recovered, and there remained one "probable" case remained to be confirmed. On Wednesday, June 3, The first death confirmed to be linked to the H1N1 virus happened in New Haven County. As of Wednesday, June 17 there are 7 confirmed cases of the H1N1 virus at Joseph A. Foran High School of Milford. The school is following a half day schedule until the end of the year, which was reported as being successful for preventing the virus.

By July 22, 2009, there were 1,713 confirmed cases of swine flu in Connecticut. New Haven has the most of any town with 175 cases. In January 2010, the Connecticut CDC stated that there were 1,996 confirmed cases of A/H1N1 influenza in the first wave of the A/H1N1 influenza pandemic, and 3,386 confirmed cases of A/H1N1 influenza in the second wave of the A/H1N1 pandemic. 31 deaths from A/H1N1 were confirmed over the course of the pandemic.

== Delaware ==
The first probable cases of swine flu in Delaware were reported on Monday, April 27. Four probable cases of swine flu were reported on the University of Delaware campus after the students were experiencing flu like symptoms. Tests were sent to the CDC to see if the students had the swine flu. All four cases were confirmed by the CDC on April 28. The students were reported to be recovering, and the campus set up a temporary Public Health clinic. The Delaware Division of Public Health reported on May 1 a further 17 probable cases, all from the university.

As of July 24, the CDC had reported 381 cases for Delaware.

October 22, a Kent County woman was Delaware's first H1N1-related death. As of January 2010, six deaths in Delaware had been confirmed to be due to H1N1 influenza.

== District of Columbia ==
As of June 19, 2009, the DC Department of Health reported 43 confirmed and 2 probable cases of swine flu. The department website has since not updated its case counts.

== Florida ==
- Alachua – 6
- Baker – 1
- Brevard – 5
- Broward – 12
- Calhoun – 1
- Charlotte – 2
- Citrus – 2
- Clay – 1
- Dade – 38
- DeSoto – 1
- Duval – 13
- Escambia – 1
- Hernando – 2
- Highlands – 2
- Hillsborough – 17
- Indian River – 1
- Lake – 1
- Lee – 5
- Levy – 2
- Manatee – 3
- Marion – 1
- Monroe – 2
- Nassau – 1
- Okaloosa – 2
- Okeechobee – 2
- Orange – 14
- Osceola 1
- Palm Beach – 12
- Pasco – 3
- Pinellas – 13
- Polk – 9
- Putnam – 1
- Santa Rosa – 2
- Sarasota – 5
- Seminole – 4
- St. Johns – 2
- St. Lucie – 9
- Sumter – 1
- Taylor 1
- Volusia 6
- Walton 1
- Total 208

On April 28, it was reported that an individual in Florida had tested positive for influenza type A, of which swine flu is a subtype. A culture from that person has been sent to Jacksonville to be tested for swine flu, with results expected within 48 hours. Governor Crist announced the first two confirmed cases in Florida on May 1. The cases are both children and in Lee and Broward counties.

On May 3, the Hillsborough County Health Department announced 5 possible cases of H1N1, 4 of the persons are students, and the other is a relative who has recently traveled to Mexico. Three public schools (Wilson Middle School, Freedom High School, and Liberty Middle School) where the students attended have been closed till May 11.

On May 7, Alachua County announced its first case of H1N1 (Swine Flu). The person is a University of Florida student and has since recovered. On May 8, a 7-year-old boy tested positive of swine influenza in Rockledge, Brevard County, Florida . Two other children tested positive for influenza. It caused Golfview Elementary School in Rockledge to close on May 11.

On June 9, a 9-year-old boy died of Swine Flu in Miami Dade On July 10, a woman died of H1n1 in Palm Beach County.

As of July 30, Florida has reported 3,221 cases of swine flu and there is at least one in each of Florida's 67 counties.

== Georgia ==
The first case of laboratory confirmed swine flu was reported on April 30. A Kentucky woman was hospitalized in LaGrange while visiting family in Georgia; she had recently returned from a trip to Mexico. While Georgia health officials reported this as a confirmed case for the state, the CDC and the Kentucky health department reported it as a case in Kentucky. In relation to this case, state officials said they had no plans to close schools or other public institutions.

On May 4, the Georgia Department of Human Resources announced that all classes have been temporarily suspended at Eagle's Landing Christian Academy in Henry County until the CDC confirms the status of a student who became ill. The Georgia Public Health Laboratory sent three probable cases to the CDC over the weekend for confirmation. On May 5, the Georgia Division of Public Health confirmed three cases of H1N1 located in Cobb, DeKalb and Henry Counties. Swine flu has been confirmed on the Georgia Tech and Agnes Scott College campuses.

The CDC has reported 222 cases of swine flu for Georgia as of July 24.

== Hawaii ==
On May 4, 2009, the Hawaii Department of Health announced that there were three suspected cases of swine flu in the state. Governor Linda Lingle announced that the cases were mild and that the patients were recovering at home. On May 5, 2009, all three cases were confirmed on the island of Oahu by the CDC. All three cases involve recent travel to the mainland United States. One case is a school-age child, who recently traveled to California. The two other cases are a military member, and his or her spouse. The military member traveled to Texas, and has exposed their spouse.

Two more cases were confirmed on May 6. Another four were confirmed on May 13, with two identified at Anuenue School, a Hawaiian language immersion school. In response to the outbreak, the University of Hawaii at Manoa announced that it will not be shaking graduates' hands at its commencement.

On June 19, 2009, Hawaii confirmed its first swine flu-related death, a 60-year-old woman who had complications from the swine flu who later died at Tripler Army Medical Center.

As of July 24, the CDC has reported 1,424 cases for Hawaii. As of January 20, 2010, Hawaii has reported 13 confirmed deaths due to A/H1N1 influenza.

== Idaho ==
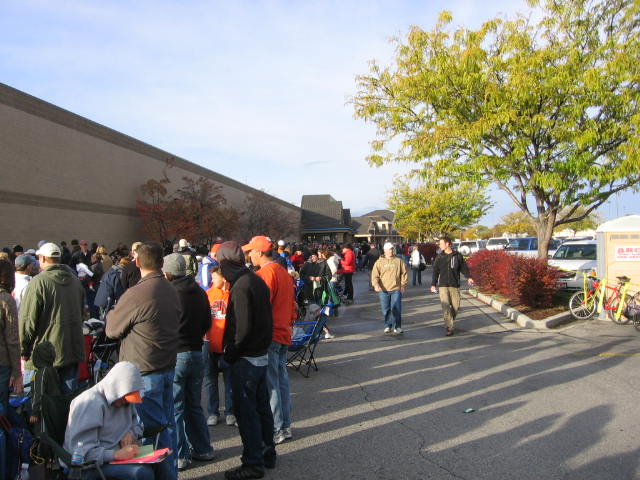
High-risk groups line up on October 24, 2009, at a defunct Kmart for the first H1N1 vaccines publicly available in Boise, Idaho.

On May 3, 2009, the CDC confirmed the state's first H1N1 infection, that of a Kootenai County woman in her 60s.

On September 29, 2009, The Idaho Department of Health and Welfare confirmed that a Canyon County man in his 50s, with an already existing medical condition, died from the H1N1 virus, by which time 488 cases had been confirmed.

By late October the H1N1 vaccine was available for high-risk groups for whom H&W set up clinics and distribution centers in, among other places, defunct big box stores.

By December 10, 2009, there had been 812 laboratory-confirmed cases, 381 influenza-related hospitalizations (most of them of children under ten), and 18 deaths. Furthermore, the vaccine became readily available to the general public under 65.

By December 30, 2009, the state had 824 laboratory-confirmed cases since September 1, and the virus had contributed to the deaths of 20 people.

By January 23, 2010, despite at least 23 Idaho deaths and 385 hospitalizations and the widespread availability of the H1N1 vaccine, only 10% to 15% of the populace of Ada County had been inoculated, prompting concern amongst public health officials.

== Illinois ==
The state's first probable case of swine flu was reported on Wednesday, April 29. An elementary school in Chicago's Rogers Park neighborhood, on the city's Far North Side, was closed because a 12-year-old student was presumed to have the disease. The student reportedly was recovering at home. By April 30, over 40 probable cases had been identified by state and local health officials. In addition to 16 cases in the city of Chicago, and 11 in surrounding Cook County, cases were reported in Kane, Lake, DuPage, McHenry, and Will counties. Several schools in the affected areas were temporarily closed. Many other flu cases happened during or even before the launch of the alert were then confirmed, principally in the urban area of Chicago. By May 20, the following 17 counties had confirmed cases: Boone, Cook, DeKalb, DuPage, Franklin, Kane, Kankakee, Kendall, Knox, Lake, McDonough, McHenry, Ogle, Sangamon, Will, Williamson, and Winnebago. Total confirmed cases in Illinois were 794, up from 707 the previous day.

Cases in Illinois throughout May 2009 continued to climb and by May 31, 2009, the published CDC numbers had reached 1002 confirmed cases with 2 deaths. A third confirmed death – the first outside of the Chicago metropolitan area – was reported by state health authorities on May 28, 2009, but this was not reflected in the CDC official numbers by the end of the month.

A total of 3,366 cases and 17 deaths have been confirmed in Illinois as of July 24. As of January 2010, a total of 2931 hospitalizations due to confirmed A/H1N1 infection and a total of 97 confirmed deaths due to H1N1 have been reported in Illinois.

== Indiana ==
On April 28, an unidentified Notre Dame student was confirmed as the first case of swine flu in this state. The patient had not recently traveled to Mexico or been in contact with anyone who has traveled to Mexico. The student was in voluntarily quarantine, and was doing well, according to Judy Monroe, Indiana's state health commissioner. Two other cases in the state which occurred in two Indianapolis elementary schools were confirmed by the CDC shortly thereafter. Additional cases later surfaced in the counties of Hendricks, Lake, Marion, Putnam, St. Joseph, and Tippecanoe. On July 10, 2009, a young teenager died of Swine Flu, this was the first death in Indiana because of this disease.

As of July 24, the CDC has reported 291 cases of swine flu. As of February 2010, there have been at least 38 confirmed deaths due to A/H1N1 infection. Also, since September 1, there have been at least 468 confirmed cases of H1N1 in Indiana.

== Kansas ==
Health officials in Kansas announced April 25 that two new cases of swine flu had been confirmed in Dickinson County, after both were isolated. The week prior, one patient had traveled to Mexico by plane to attend a professional conference; both he and his wife experienced minor influenza symptoms.

As of July 24, 2009 there were 213 confirmed cases of swine flu in Kansas, 101 in adults and 112 in children. However, in Wyandotte and Johnson counties the state had instructed that only hospitalized patients needed to be tested so the numbers were quite possibly higher. By June 30, 2009, there were 129 confirmed swine flu cases in Kansas. As of January 9, 26 people have died of infection with H1N1, including a healthy 52-year-old man with no underlying health problems that would place him at higher risk for A/H1N1 infection. Also, a 6-year-old Kansas boy and 27-year-old Kansas woman, have also died from infection with H1N1, reinforcing the fact that young, healthy people can die from infection with A/H1N1, and that vaccination is recommended even for those without preexisting medical problems.

== Kentucky ==
A Warren County woman who had recently visited Mexico tested positive for the virus April 30. After returning to Kentucky from Mexico, she traveled to Georgia where she was hospitalized. Health officials from both states announced this as the first confirmed case in their states, however the CDC listed the case in Kentucky.

In Jefferson County, Meyzeek Middle school had three cases of H1N1 influenza. This initially started from a staff member, but spread to students.

== Louisiana ==
As of July 21, there are a total of 232 swine flu cases confirmed by The Louisiana Department of Health and Hospitals. Up from 114 reported on May 28. As of January 2010, 1,973 confirmed cases of H1N1 have been reported, and 43 H1N1 deaths have been confirmed, in Louisiana.

== Maine ==
On April 29, three cases of H1N1 (swine flu) were confirmed in Maine, according to the Maine Center for Disease Control. The three adults, two from Kennebec County and one from York County, were reported to be recovering at home. Dr. Dora Anne Mills, former director of Maine CDC, said on April 28 that at least 12 suspected cases were being tested.

Late on April 29, Maine Governor John Baldacci declared a "civil emergency" and ordered a school and daycare facility in York County to close for seven days.

As of July 22, there have been 282 cases confirmed throughout Maine. As of November 26, 1562 confirmed cases, 97 hospitalized cases, and 9 deaths have been reported in Maine. Also, 172 schools have reported outbreaks of H1N1 since May, according to Dr. Dora Anne Mills and the Maine CDC. On December 2, 2009, it was announced that H1N1 has killed 2 more Mainers, bringing the death toll to 11. As of December 17, 2009, the Maine CDC states that although 203 Mainers have now been hospitalized and the death toll has risen to 17 in Maine, H1N1 flu activity is decreasing in Maine, and vaccine availability is increasing rapidly, so all Mainers can now get the vaccine. Dr. Dora Anne Mills reminded Mainers that 150 Mainers die every year from regular influenza. As of December 24, 2009, Maine was one of the only 7 states reporting widespread influenza activity, though Maine's influenza activity was declining as well. As of January 7, 2010, H1N1 activity has decreased from widespread to regional for the first time since October 17, 2009. Although H1N1 activity in Maine has declined for the time being, H1N1 continues to circulate in Maine. H1N1 could return later this year, so it is still very important to get vaccinated against A/H1N1 influenza, Dr. Dora Anne Mills says. So far, 18 deaths, 225 hospitalizations, and 2220 cases have been confirmed.

As of January 14, the CDC states just 3 more patients required hospital care due to H1N1 disease, no new deaths occurred, and only 6 new cases were confirmed. However, one outbreak in a long-term care facility was confirmed. As of January 28, H1N1 activity has decreased significantly, with the CDC classifying current influenza activity as sporadic. No new cases of A/H1N1 influenza were confirmed between January 21 and January 28.

However, as of February 4, the Maine CDC reports that influenza activity has increased enough for the state to be again classified as having regional influenza activity, and that one person had died of confirmed A/H1N1 infection over the previous week, bringing the number of confirmed deaths from A/H1N1 to 19 in the state.

== Maryland ==
By May 1, 2009, eleven probable cases had been identified in Maryland, in Anne Arundel, Baltimore, Charles, Prince George's, and Montgomery Counties. One of these cases, that of a high school student in Rockville, resulted in the closing of Rockville High School, the first Maryland school closure due to the outbreak. On May 1, three other schools in the state were closed. As of May 5, Rockville High School had reopened. Takoma Park Middle School also began to take action due to a student catching swine flu. Four of Maryland's probable cases were confirmed on May 4, including two adults and one child in Baltimore County as well as one young child in Anne Arundel county. There were 4 cases of swine flu in Worcester County Public Schools in Maryland. In Washington County in Northeast Maryland, there were many cases of the Swine Flu almost causing the closure of four schools.

As of Fall 2009, there had been 954 confirmed cases in Maryland.

In late September 2009 a 13-year-old Baltimore resident became the first minor to die from swine flu in Maryland. As of December 2, oseltamivir-resistant H1N1 was confirmed in Maryland. As of January 12, 2010, 43 confirmed deaths from H1N1 have been reported, and at least 969 patients have been hospitalized with A/H1N1 virus infection in Maryland.

== Massachusetts ==
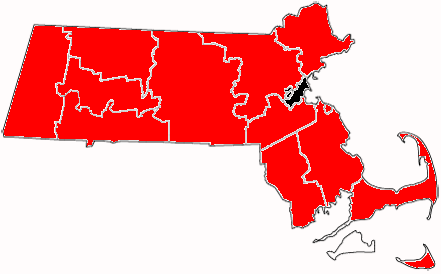
As of 11:00 EDT, June 6, 2009: Death(s) confirmed Case(s) confirmed Case(s) unconfirmed (both suspected and probable cases)

There are 1,398 confirmed cases in Massachusetts, 172 of which have led to hospitalizations. The first death from swine flu in Massachusetts occurred on June 14, 2009, when a 30-year-old Boston woman died. Eleven deaths have been confirmed as being caused by the H1N1 virus in total.

=== By county ===
- Barnstable County
  - A member of the US Coast Guard stationed on Cape Cod, acquired the virus while training in California, but reportedly recovered.
- Bristol County
  - The Health Agent for the town of Easton stated that there are "a couple of suspected cases in town."
  - The Mass. Dept. of Public Health announced that they had 1 confirmed case of the virus in the city of Fall River in southeastern Massachusetts.
- Dukes County
  - Martha's Vineyard Hospital treated five confirmed cases of H1N1, two of which required hospitalization.
- Franklin County
  - There is at least 1 confirmed case reported in the county.
- Hampshire County
  - Two students at Amherst College in Amherst had confirmed cases of the virus and 13 other students are 'suspected' cases. All 15 students are being isolated on campus. A third student at the school contracted the H1N1 virus. Also, there has been 1 'suspected' case each at Mount Holyoke College (in South Hadley) and Smith College (in Northampton).
- Middlesex County
  - The Massachusetts Department of Public Health informed the Ashland school superintendent that two Ashland High School students have "probable" cases of H1N1 flu.
  - The CDC confirmed that an elementary school student in Chelmsford tested positive for acquiring the virus.
  - In Cambridge, there are 2 students (at the Massachusetts Institute of Technology) that are "probable" cases of having acquired the virus.
  - Eight residents of Framingham are being tested for being "probable" cases.
  - The Lincoln Public Schools Superintendent had confirmed a Lincoln middle school student been diagnosed with the H1N1 virus.
  - Two middle school students in Lowell have tested positive for swine flu as of April 29, 2009. The two had gone on a family trip to Mexico, and became mildly sick on returning home. The local health department said that the boys had not returned to school since coming back from Mexico, and there were no concerns that the illness had been spread.
  - In Tyngsboro, there had been 1 probable case reported at the Academy of Notre Dame.
  - There is 1 suspected case of the virus in the city of Waltham.
  - Winchester Hospital in Winchester reported having received a possible case (of the virus) within the town.
  - There had been two additional confirmed cases, 1 of each located in the municipalities of Bedford and Weston.
  - In Wayland there has been one confirmed case at the elementary school level and one possible case at the high school level.
- Norfolk County
  - The health inspector of Quincy confirmed that a New York resident who checked into Quincy Medical Center on May 1, 2009, and tested positive for the H1N1 flu.
  - The CDC confirmed that a resident of the Wellesley College campus tested positive for the virus.
  - The Dana Hall School in Wellesley was closed after nearly 100 students called in sick.
- Plymouth County
  - The CDC had announced 4 additional confirmed cases, from 2 adults and 2 school-age residents (of the state), from the following counties: (3) Middlesex County and (1) Plymouth County.
- Suffolk County
  - Massachusetts' Secretary of Health and Human Services announced that 'some' of the 34 confirmed cases in the state are from the Harvard School of Dental Medicine campus (at the Longwood Medical Area in Boston), which is temporarily closed. Later, it was reported that 3 of the 9 reported cases of influenza at the school, resulted positive for the H1N1 virus.
  - On May 1, 2009, a United Airlines Flight 903 from Munich to Washington D.C., was diverted to Logan International Airport in Boston. A 53-year-old passenger complained of flu-like symptoms, that led him to be admitted to Massachusetts General Hospital.
  - A male passenger in his 40s complained of flu-like symptoms upon landing at Logan International Airport in Boston May 2, 2009. He was flying aboard American Airlines Flight 155, from London to Boston, that had originated from Malaysia. He, too, was admitted to Massachusetts General Hospital in Boston.
  - The Boston University Goldman School of Dental Medicine reported a single resident that has a confirmed case of the virus. They claim that he has had no contact with anybody on the school's main campus, and those he has been in contact with have been notified.
  - Both Boston Latin, where 250 called in sick, and the Winsor School, where 34 called in sick, and were closed.
- Worcester County
  - There is at least 1 confirmed case reported in the county.
- Other
  - In Spencer, two students who also had recently returned from Mexico were tested for possible swine flu infection. The results of those tests were both negative.

== Michigan ==
As of 17:00 EDT, June 24, 2009: Death(s) confirmed Case(s) confirmed

On April 29, a 34-year-old woman from Livingston County was Michigan's first reported case of swine flu. On April 30, another 34-year-old woman from Ottawa County was confirmed as Michigan's second case. As of June 13, Michigan reports 655 confirmed flu cases, and as of July 23, nine deaths. The health department has since stopped reporting cases but continues to update deaths.

The first death in Michigan was of a 53-year-old woman who lived in Warren and had other under-lying health problems. The second Michigan death occurred in Roscommon County.

As of August 10, 2009, ten deaths have been reported in Michigan due to the H1N1 virus. Michigan has stopped keeping a running tally of confirmed cases.

On October 28, 2009, 157 schools in Michigan were closed due to the swine flu.

== Minnesota ==
On April 30, 2009, the Minnesota Department of Health announced that the first case of "H1N1 novel influenza virus" in the state was confirmed by the CDC. The infected individual is an unidentified resident of Cold Spring, Minnesota. Two schools in the affected city remained closed until May 6, 2009.

On May 4, 2009, the second case of H1N1 was confirmed in Minnesota by the Minnesota Department of Health. The case was reported in a teen boy attending a Minneapolis Public School.

A Minneapolis five-year-old girl had succumbed to the flu during the week of June 8.

As of July 23, 684 cases and three deaths have been reported. As of January 13, 2 more people died of confirmed A/H1N1 influenza, increasing the number of confirmed deaths from H1N1 to 55 in the state. However, H1N1 influenza activity is currently low in Minnesota, with only one school outbreak reported in the first week of 2010.

== Missouri ==
Death(s) confirmed Case(s) confirmed Unconfirmed cases from other sources

In Missouri, Gov. Jay Nixon announced in a written statement that a probable case had been discovered in a Platte County man, and that a sample had been sent to the CDC for confirmation.

As of May 8, 2009, the Missouri Department of Health and Senior Services (DHSS) reported 10 confirmed and 4 probable cases of swine flu.

On May 19, 2009, a St. Louis County man became the first death in Missouri due to the Swine Flu.

On May 21, 2009, St. Louis Public School District announced one of its students had the Swine Flu but has not been in class since May 15.

In St. Charles Missouri it was also found that a student from St. Charles High School who traveled to Mexico City was found infected with swine flu. The student who just came back from Mexico City was in school for a week than kicked out and brought back.

On June 11, 2009, a teenager from New Bloomfield (11 miles north of the Jefferson City) in Callaway County became the 50th confirmed case of H1N1 in Missouri.

On June 20, 2009, about 20 to 30 campers at a Lake of the Ozarks summer camp in Morgan County reported having mild flu-like symptoms, of which two cases were confirmed to be H1N1. The camp was closed down for a week.

Another summer camp in Stone County near Branson reported at least 15 campers who have tested positive for the flu in preliminary tests on June 24. The preliminary results were possibly sent to a lab in neighboring Taney County as local reporters attempted to dispute or deny that any flu cases were reported in Taney County by going as far as to cite that the Taney County Health Department found zero cases of the flu. Official results from the DHSS confirm the camp had five campers with H1N1, but that all the campers were from out of state.

Reports from Adair, Buchanan, and Jefferson County were added on June 25 to DHSS's list of confirmed cases, bringing the count to 58 cases. These reports may be based on where people with H1N1 are from rather than where it was located in relation to the H1N1 cases reported at summer camps.

The youngest case of H1N1 was confirmed by DHSS in Cole County on June 25, 2009. An infant was reported with having Flu-like symptoms which was confirmed by DHSS.

As of July 23, there have been 80 cases in Missouri. Adding to the latest cases are two children from Springfield.

As of July 31, there have been 86 cases. Clay and Moniteau Counties were added to the list of counties with confirmed cases.

As of August 8, there have been 158 confirmed cases in Missouri.

On August 15, a 5-year-old boy from St. Francis County checked into the hospital with H1N1

As of September 5, there have been 37 suspected cases of H1N1 at Saint Louis University in St. Louis, MO.

== Mississippi ==
The Mississippi State Department of Health continues to monitor and investigate human cases of a new type of influenza, H1N1 swine influenza (also known as "novel H1N1 influenza") now present in Mississippi. Symptoms of swine flu in humans are similar to those of seasonal flu, causing fever, respiratory symptoms and body aches. H1N1 swine flu has contributed to a number of deaths nationwide, principally in those with pre-existing health conditions. 898 Mississippi cases of H1N1 swine flu have been identified and 7 deaths since May 15. Mississippians are advised to continue to exercise protective hygiene to avoid illness. As of January 25, 14 Mississippians have died of the H1N1 flu, and more than 635 cases have been confirmed.

== Montana ==
On May 11, 2009, the Montana Department of Public Health and Human Services (DPHHH) reported the state's first confirmed case of swine flu. As of July 26, there have been 122 reported cases. As of January 21, there have been 801 confirmed cases of A/H1N1, and 18 confirmed deaths due to H1N1 flu.

== Nebraska ==
As of July 26, 2009, there are 313 confirmed cases of swine flu in Nebraska. Nebraska has recorded sixteen hospitalizations and three deaths. as of December 11,13 deaths from A/H1N1 influenza have been reported.

== Nevada ==
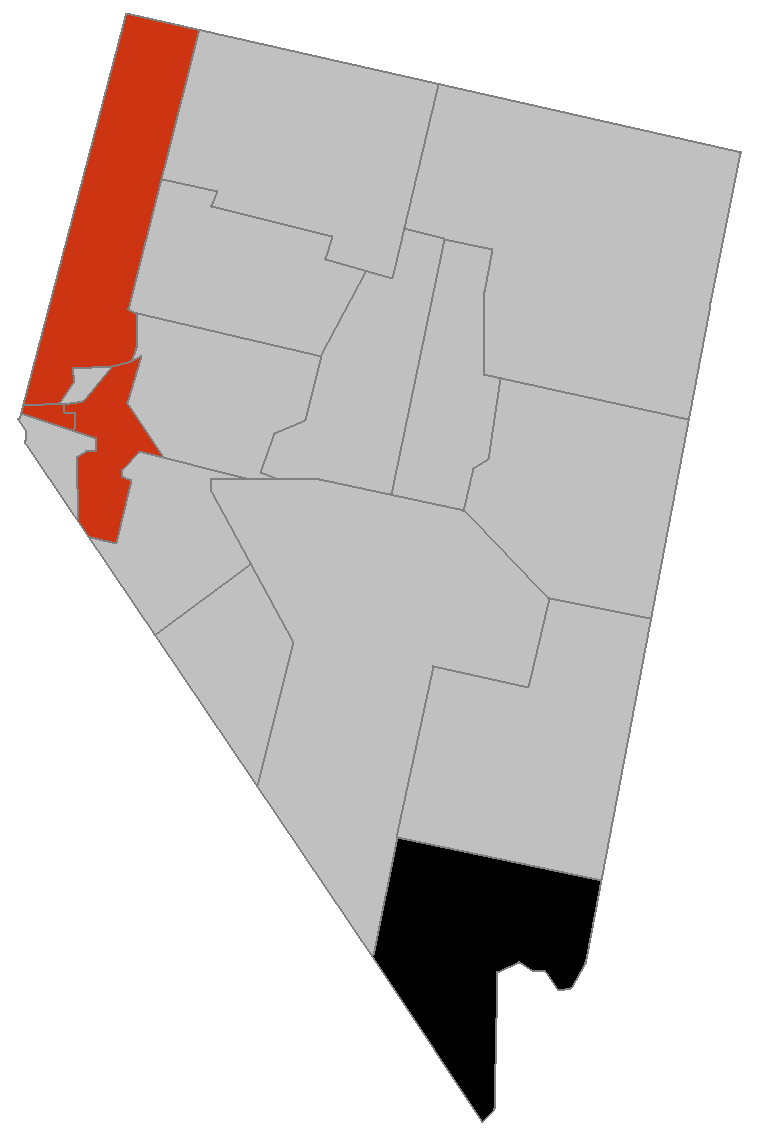
As of July 23, 2009: Case(s) confirmed Death(s) confirmed

The first confirmed case of the virus was reported in Nevada on April 29. A two-year-old girl from Reno contracted the virus, but it is unclear how as the case did not appear to be linked to any previously affected areas. As of recent the virus has spread to Clark County, where the city of Las Vegas lies. It has also resulted in the closing of Mendive Middle School in Sparks, Reno's neighboring city, where ten students were confirmed to have contracted the virus.

Through October 14, 2009 there had been 229 confirmed cases and 12 deaths in Clark County, Nevada, 964 confirmed cases and 2 deaths in Washoe County, Nevada, 265 confirmed cases and 0 deaths in Carson City, Nevada, and 431 confirmed cases and 1 death in the state's remaining 14 counties, totaling in 1871 cases and 15 deaths.

== New Hampshire ==
The New Hampshire Department of Health and Human Services announced the state's first confirmed case of the H1N1 flu May 2, 2009. The confirmed case involved an employee of Concord Hospital in Concord, New Hampshire.

As of July 6, there had been 232 confirmed cases. As of December 12, at least 9 people had died of H1N1 influenza in New Hampshire.

== New Jersey ==
As of July 22, 2009, the New Jersey Government has confirmed 936 cases of swine flu and 480 probable cases, most of them within a range of 30 minutes of New York or Philadelphia. More swine flu cases are being reported daily, which has caused a widespread in the state. Counties currently confirmed with swine flu: Atlantic (20), Bergen (63), Burlington (64), Camden (35), Cape May (3), Cumberland (17), Essex (105), Gloucester (12), Hudson (85), Hunterdon(17), Mercer (47), Middlesex (115), Monmouth (60), Morris (45), Ocean (48), Passaic (63), Salem (3), Somerset (37), Sussex (13), Union (62), Warren (22), which indicates that currently 21 counties have confirmed cases of swine flu.

The first swine flu death in New Jersey occurred on June 13, 2009. The man who died was a 49-year-old resident of Essex County. As of January 13, 2010,14 confirmed deaths from H1N1 have been reported, since September 1 in New Jersey.

== New Mexico ==
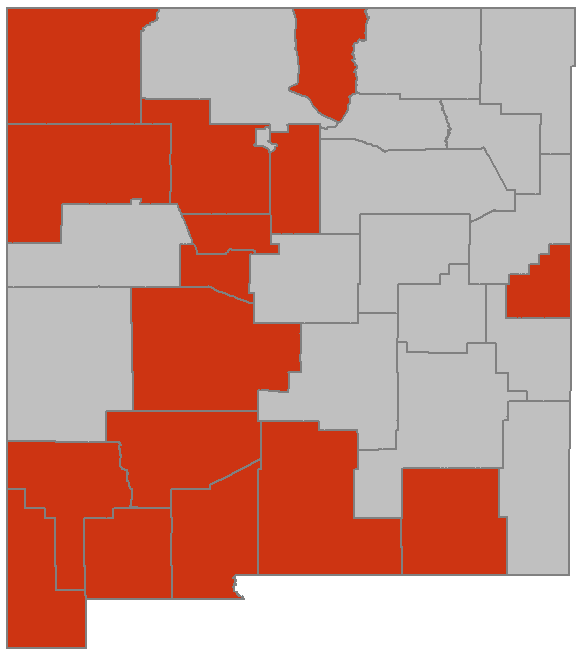
New Mexico As of July 20, 2009: Case(s) confirmed

On April 29, 2009, Gov. Bill Richardson announced that there are two very probable cases in New Mexico. The suspected cases were a 1-year-old boy from Santa Fe County and an 18-year-old man from Valencia County. The 1-year-old tested negative for H1N1, but the 18-year-old man tested positive. More cases were raised in the intervening days, and by May 1 the probable case number was increased to nine.

As of May 30, 2009, the New Mexico Department of Health has confirmed 156 total cases of the H1N1 virus in various counties with the CDC reporting 232 cases. New Mexico has since stopped reporting cases.

== New York ==
- New York City – 105
- New York State – 101
- Total – 206

=== Introduction ===
On April 24, New York City Department of Health and Mental Hygiene dispatched a team of investigators to the private St. Francis Preparatory School in Queens after 150 students complained of symptoms consistent with the disease. Several of the students had recently traveled to Mexico City. New York City Health Commissioner Thomas Frieden reported on April 25 that eight of the New York school cases were "probable" swine flu.

On April 26 the Centers for Disease Control and Prevention (CDC) confirmed that the Queens cases are indeed associated with the H1N1 virus. The students suffered only mild symptoms, and some have since recovered.

On April 27 federal officials confirmed 20 new US cases at the same school in New York in which eight cases were confirmed earlier.

As of April 29, one undergraduate commuter student on the Queens Campus of St. John's University had contracted the Swine Flu (A/H1N1) virus. The student was treated and recovered.

On May 14, three New York City public schools were closed due to the flu symptoms of hundreds of students.

On May 17, Mitchell Wiener, the assistant principal at a Queens school was confirmed as New York State's first death due to the disease.

On May 24, a woman in her 50s died because of the disease and had other health problems. She is New York State's second death and the 11th in the country. On June 1 a child from the Bronx became the first minor in New York City to die of swine flu. On Wednesday, June 4, a man died in Onondaga County, which marked the first fatality from swine flu in New York outside of New York City.

A city health department poll suggested that more than half a million citizens of New York may be infected as of June 11.

By June 17, 2009, there had been 30 Swine flu deaths in New York.

As of July 24, the CDC has reported 2,738 confirmed cases of the H1N1 flu.

== North Carolina ==
The state health director, Jeffrey Engel, announced that there had been two probable cases of swine flu in the state. The first case was a man traveling through Wake County, where the capital is located, on business. The other case was an Onslow County resident who had recently traveled to Texas. On a related note, North Carolina is one of 29 states that have deemed to have not stockpiled enough flu medicines by federal guidelines. However, Engel dismissed these concerns, saying, "I think the commercial supply will keep up at the present time."

North Carolina has 483 confirmed cases as of July 22. There have been six deaths confirmed in the state. The most famous victim of swine flu was Elliott Wilson, a student at North Carolina State University. He contracted the virus on September 10, 2009, and was responsible for infecting 13% of the student population.

== North Dakota ==
As of July 23, North Dakota had 63 confirmed cases of swine flu.

== Ohio ==
On April 26, the Ohio Department of Health reported that a nine-year-old boy attending Elyria City Schools in Elyria, Lorain County, had been diagnosed with a mild case of the new strain of swine influenza and that his immediate family was undergoing testing. After the confirmed case in Ohio and eight in New York occurred Federal officials declared a public health emergency. The Cleveland health department received numerous calls from concerned residents the first week of the outbreak, although it has been difficult to tell whether or not the cases are swine flu, since it is regular flu season. On April 29, a probable case was reported in Columbus, and two new cases were confirmed in Columbus on May 2, one of them being an employee of Ohio State University Medical Center.

As of July 24, 2009 there were 186 confirmed cases of swine flu in Ohio.

In September 2009, a 20-year-old Columbus woman died from H1N1 a week after having a c-section to give birth to her child at 32 weeks gestation.

As of October 9, 2009 a 14-year-old boy was reported as Ohio's first pediatric death.

== Oklahoma ==
In Muskogee, Oklahoma a man who recently visited Mexico had been admitted into a hospital after having H1N1 flu symptoms, but test results on May 1 returned negative. On May 5, a woman from Pontotoc County was confirmed to have H1N1 flu, On May 7, Oklahoma State Department of Health confirmed three new cases of the H1N1 virus: a child from Oklahoma County, and one adult and a teenage female in Cleveland County. All have recovered but, there has been one death in the state so far. On July 20 it was confirmed that a teenager in Tulsa had the swine flu.

As of July 22, there have been 203 cases reported.

== Oregon ==
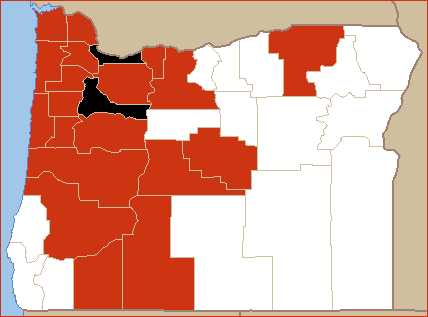
Confirmed as of July 24, 2009: 6 Death(s) 530 Case(s)

The first probable case of H1N1 flu in Oregon was announced on April 30 by the Oregon Department of Human Services (ODHS). By May 3, three people had been tested positive for swine flu. On May 22, the ODHS announced that 46% of patients who tested positive for flu since March 4 were indeed infected with H1N1 flu, with the rest having just a seasonal flu.

H1N1 has been detected in 530 residents of Oregon as of July 24, 2009. Confirmed cases have been found in 21 out of 36 counties, including Benton County, Clackamas County, Clatsop County, Columbia County, Crook County, Deschutes County, Douglas County, Hood River County, Jackson County, Klamath County, Lane County, Lincoln County, Linn County, Marion County, Multnomah County, Polk County, Tillamook County, Umatilla County, Wasco County, Washington County, and Yamhill County.

On June 8, 2009, Oregon's first H1N1-related death in Marion County was reported by the ODHS. Since then, five other deaths have been reported; another two in Marion County (June 15, 2009 and July 24, 2009) and three in Multnomah County (June 26, 2009, July 3, 2009, and July 17, 2009).

== Pennsylvania ==
As of June 16, 2009: Death(s) confirmed Case(s) confirmed

On May 3, The Pennsylvania Department of Health said that a 31-year-old male in Montgomery County had the H1N1 flu. By May 5 probable cases were under investigation in Philadelphia (10), Bucks (2), Chester (2), Dauphin (3) confirmed cases, Allegheny (1), Cambria (1), Franklin (1), Lehigh (1), Luzerne (1), Lycoming (1), Montgomery (1), and York (1) counties.

On June 4, a 55-year-old woman in Berks County was confirmed as the first death in Pennsylvania due to swine flu. This was followed by the deaths of a 26-year-old Philadelphia woman with no known underlying conditions on June 7, and a 48-year-old woman in Pike County on June 13.

Confirmed and probable case counts and deaths are updated daily at the Pennsylvania Department of Health. As January 19, 2010,2997 people have either had confirmed or probable cases of A/H1N1 influenza in Pennsylvania, and at least 14 have died.

== Rhode Island ==
On May 2, 2009, Rhode Island confirmed its first case of H1N1 Flu in a Westerly woman. Rhode Island reported its first death from swine flu on June 18.

As of August 26, 2009, the Rhode Island Department of Health has reported 203 confirmed cases of H1N1 flu and two deaths. Three swines from a farm just north of Barrington contracted the flu which gave farmer Jimmy Bo-Brown many headaches. Sick swine have stunted growth and require increased attention from the farmer often leading to headaches. Two of the swines Elliott and Wilson died from dehydration and the last one recovered after about a week and was promptly slaughtered for bacon.

== South Carolina ==
On August 28, 2009, the South Carolina Department of Health and Environmental Control (SCDHEC) announced it will begin the first full week of reporting all laboratory confirmed influenza hospitalizations and deaths to the CDC on September 8, 2009.

The South Carolina Department of Health has reported 313 cases as of July 24 throughout the state.

Thirteen cases of the flu virus were confirmed in South Carolina on April 30. All 13 were students or parents from the private Newberry Academy in Newberry, South Carolina; many had traveled to Mexico earlier in the month. All nearby public schools were closed for May 1.

On August 31, South Carolina recorded its first death from influenza A H1N1. The Byrnes Schools High School in Florence, SC closed because of the H1N1 flu from September 23 to September 25.

== South Dakota ==
As of July 24, South Dakota has confirmed 48 cases of swine flu and hospitalized two patients.

== Tennessee ==
As of July 22, there have been 282 confirmed cases of swine flu. On July 15, the state reported its first death. On September 7, the second death was reported in Memphis, Tennessee.

== Texas ==
- Cochran – 1
- Floyd – 1
- Lamb – 1
- Lubbock – 5

Region 1 Total – 8

- Baylor – 1
- Coleman – 1
- Collin – 1
- Dallas – 24
- Denton – 1
- Ellis – 2
- Fisher – 1
- Jack – 1
- Kaufman – 1
- Parker – 1
- Rockwall – 1
- Tarrant – 13

Region 2/3 Total – 48

- Angelina – 2
- Bowie – 1
- Lamar – 1
- Morris – 2
- Smith – 2
- Upshur – 1
- Van Zandt – 1

Region 4/5N Total = 10

- Brazoria – 2
- Fort Bend – 3
- Galveston – 2
- Harris – 26
- Jefferson – 1
- Montgomery – 1
- Orange – 1
- Walker – 1

Region 6/5S Total = 37

- Bastrop – 1
- Bell – 2
- Brazos – 1
- Caldwell – 2
- Falls – 1
- Hays – 2
- McLennan – 1
- Travis – 6
- Williamson – 1

Region 7 Total = 17

- Bexar – 12
- Gonzales – 1
- Guadalupe – 1
- Karnes – 1
- Maverick – 2
- Val Verde – 1
- Victoria – 2
- Wilson – 1

Region 8 Total = 21

- Andrews – 1
- El Paso – 17
- Martin – 1

Region 9/10 Total = 19

- Bee – 1
- Cameron – 4
- Hidalgo – 25
- Jim Wells – 1
- Nueces – 10
- San Patrico – 4
- Starr – 3
- Webb – 1

Region 11 Total = 49

Total- 209

As of CDT 23:30, July 16, 2009: (source) Death(s) confirmed Case(s) confirmed Case(s) probable

Texas has reported 4,998 cases and 27 deaths as of July 24. Of the first 13 deaths confirmed in Texas, one was a Mexican citizen.

Two students attending Byron P. Steele II High School in Cibolo were confirmed to have the A/H1N1 swine flu; the patients recovered. A third possible case in a student who attends the same high school as the two other cases in Texas has been identified and the school is closed temporarily. On April 25, the Texas Department of State Health Services (DSHS) decided to close Byron P. Steele II High School for the following week. Following the discovery of more possible swine flu illnesses, the DSHS ordered that all schools and district facilities in the Schertz-Cibolo-Universal City Independent School District be closed for the week.

On April 27, a 7-year-old, a 24-year-old, and a 3-month-old in Dallas County were confirmed to have swine flu. All recovering and were not hospitalized. That same day, the Richardson Independent School District in the northern Dallas suburb of Richardson shut down Canyon Creek Elementary School due to a confirmed and two suspected cases of swine flu. All schools in New Braunfels—private schools and all campuses of the Comal and New Braunfels Independent School Districts—announced closures through May 10 on the recommendation of the Medical Authority of Comal County. On May 6, the New Braunfels Herald-Zeitung reported that all schools in Guadalupe and Comal counties would reopen on Thursday, May 7, four days earlier than had previously been announced.

Due to the swine flu, the University Interscholastic League (UIL) suspended all athletic, musical, and academic competitions and games for primary and secondary public education in the state of Texas until May 11.

On April 28, the City of Houston Health Department and Texas Children's Hospital sent samples in to the CDC. There are also possible cases at the Baylor College of Medicine outpatient clinic, Memorial Hermann Hospital, and St. Luke's Hospital.

A 23-month-old Mexican toddler who had been brought to Houston from Brownsville died on April 27, making the child the first US death due to the outbreak. The child had traveled with his family from Mexico to Brownsville to visit relatives. The infant was admitted to a Brownsville hospital after becoming ill, then transferred to Texas Children's Hospital the next day.

Texas Governor Rick Perry issued a disaster declaration.

On April 29, it was confirmed by Harris County that a 17-year-old girl from Fort Bend County attending Episcopal High School in Bellaire had contracted and recovered from the A/H1N1 swine flu. In compliance with the directives of the Harris County Public Health and Environmental Services Department, the school has been closed until further notice. Also in Fort Worth, a rising number of possible and confirmed cases in the district made school officials close all schools starting the next day, April 30. Schools in FWISD remained closed until May 8. The district was the biggest in the nation to close resulting in 80,000 students out of school and 11,000 staff members out of their jobs for that time. During the next week 6 school districts in Dallas-Fort Worth shut down. Including Cleburne, Lewisville, Decatur, Denton, Fort Worth, and Ponder. Other schools in Plano, Dallas, and Richardson were also closed, but did not result in a district wide shut down. Other smaller districts also shut down. Also that day, a probable case caused the closure of Lucy Read Pre-Kindergarten Demonstration School in north Austin.

Denton County reported its first confirmed swine flu case April 30, in a child in Plano; the student attended Wilson Middle School in the Plano Independent School District, and the district decided to close the Collin County school until May 11. Navo Middle School and Lee Elementary School, of Denton Independent School District were also closed after three students at both schools respectively were diagnosed with type A influenza. As of May 2, the rest of Denton ISD officially closed for the following week, but as of May 5, all schools are officially reopening on May 7.

The Superintendent of Keller Independent School District in Keller reported 3 possible cases, one in each of three schools.

On April 30, 8 suspected cases were recognized in El Paso County. Lab samples have been sent to CDC. No further information has been provided at this time until cases are confirmed. At this time, international borders will remain open. The El Paso Dept. of Public Health identified 11 more suspect cases of H1N1 flu in El Paso County on Friday, May 1, to bring the total number of suspect cases to 19. Lamar Consolidated ISD closed Lamar Junior High School due to a suspected (probable) case. Weslaco ISD closed all campuses for 7 days after a student was confirmed to have contracted type A influenza.

On May 5, Judy Trunnell, a woman in her 30s suffering from "chronic underlying health conditions" died of swine flu in Cameron County, near the US-Mexico border. She was the first US citizen to die from the disease. The woman, a special education teacher, had recently given birth to an eight-month-term healthy baby, delivered by caesarian section. She had been in a coma after being admitted to the hospital with breathing problems on April 19.

On August 28, a 52-year-old woman with underlying health conditions became the first death in Dallas County. Meanwhile, at TCU in Fort Worth there is an outbreak of swine flu on the campus. On Monday August 24, 10 students had possible cases of swine flu, by Wednesday the number had jumped to 88. Students that are sick are being asked to isolate themselves in their dorm rooms. SMU and UT at Arlington are also each reporting less than 5 cases of swine flu each. This is all occurring as schools in the state of Texas return to school.

On October 14, it was confirmed, that Reality TV star Melissa Rycroft who lived in Newark, New Jersey over the summer and came back to Dallas has swine flu. As of January 2, 2010, 203 Texans have died of H1N1 influenza, 474 Texans were admitted to the intensive care unit due to A/H1N1, and 2,052 Texans have been hospitalized due to A/H1N1 influenza.

== Utah ==
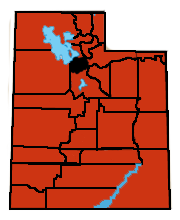
As of 12:30 MST, June 17, 2009: Death(s) confirmed Case(s) confirmed

On April 28, 2009, one student in Park City, Utah was suspected to have swine flu. Two more students in the school district began showing similar symptoms making three probable cases. All 8 schools in the Park City School District closed the following day. On May 1 the number of probable cases was increased to 9; 6 in Summit County (Park City), 2 in Salt Lake County and 1 in the Morgan-Weber Health District and about 80 suspected cases. On May 2 at around 11 o'clock the first confirmation came back for the original case, and 7 more were confirmed by the May 6. On May 6 the probable case count was at 30. As of June 11, Utah has reported 684 cases of swine flu and has not updated since; however, the CDC has reported 988 cases as of July 24.

The first confirmed death from swine flu in Utah, of a 21-year-old man, was reported on May 20, 2009. On June 16, 2009, the number of reported deaths from Swine flu in Utah reached six. All six deaths had occurred in Salt Lake County. The state announced on June 17 two more deaths from swine flu, one of which occurred at an unspecified location outside of Salt Lake County, the other in Salt Lake County. Utah has reported 21 deaths as of October 15, 2009.

New reports available from Utah's health department as of October 28, 2009 indicated there had been 30 deaths from H1N1 in Utah, 18 through August 31, 2009 and a further 12 since that time.

On November 18, 2009, the Utah State Health department reported five more deaths from swine flu.

== Vermont ==
The Vermont Department of Health announced a probable case of the H1N1 virus in rural Orleans County. Another case of the flu was confirmed involving an adult in Windsor County.

As of July 22, there have been 62 laboratory confirmed cases.

== Virginia ==
The Virginia Department of Health had confirmed 14 cases in the state by May 7, and a total of 23 by May 21. The VDH reports cases by Health district, often without narrowing down a specific county, citing HIPAA privacy laws, as well as a desire to avoid creating a "false sense of security". 12 of the cases have been reported for the district containing Lexington, Virginia, following an early outbreak on the campus of Washington and Lee University. Additionally, there have been three cases in Fairfax, two each in the Chesterfield, Arlington and Peninsula Health districts, and one each in the Norfolk and Three Rivers Health districts.

Currently, at least 35 deaths resulting from confirmed A/H1N1 influenza have been reported in Virginia.

== Washington ==
As of October 16, 2009, the Washington State Department of Health (WSDOH) reported 174 hospitalizations and 16 deaths between April 26, 2009, and September 19, 2009, and further reported 7 additional deaths and 163 additional hospitalizations from September 19, 2009, to October 16, 2009. All the recent fatal cases and the cases resulting in hospitalizations were spread fairly equally across Western and Eastern Washington.

As of September 9, 2009, the WSDOH reported 164 hospitalized persons confirmed with 2009 H1N1, and 16 total deaths.

In its August 28, 2009 report, the WSDOH reported that it would no longer issue updates of the numbers of probable or confirmed cases, but would instead issue reports of state lab-confirmed H1N1 (swine flu) total hospitalizations and deaths. Accordingly, the WSDOH reports that from April 26, 2009, to August 28, 2009, the total number of hospitalizations was 154, and as of August 28, 2009 the total number of deaths stood at 14.

=== Deaths ===
On June 18, 2009, A King County swine flu-related death was reported, making it the third death from swine flu in Washington State.

On June 5, A Pierce County woman in her twenties became Washington's second swine flu-related death.

On May 9, it was announced that a man from Snohomish County, in his thirties with a pre-existing heart condition and active viral pneumonia, became the third confirmed US death from swine flu-involved complications. As of January 23, there have been 1383 confirmed cases of H1N1N that required hospital care in the second wave of H1N1 (since September 19, 2009), and 76 deaths.

=== Cases ===
On July 1, 2009, it was reported that the Tri-Cities had its first case of swine flu. On June 18, 2009, Grant County Health Department reported six cases of swine flu in Quincy.

As of the evening of May 22, 2009, Washington state has reported 574 confirmed cases and one death due to swine flu. The health department has since no longer reported anymore cases; however, it has reported seven deaths as of July 24. So far, confirmed cases have been identified in seventeen Washington state counties, with public facilities closed as a precaution in those counties and several others. On May 3, Seattle-King County officials announced that, due to the virus' widespread presence in the community and low rates of severity, schools would no longer be closing due to suspect or probable cases.

A majority of confirmed cases (584) have occurred in King County. 115 confirmed cases, one probable case, and one death have been reported in Snohomish County. Thirty-one confirmed cases have also been identified in Pierce County, while seven cases of swine flu have been confirmed in Clark County, bordering the city of Portland, Oregon.

Thurston County and Yakima County have reported five cases each. Spokane County and Whatcom County have reported four cases each. Kitsap County and Mason County have each reported three cases. Two cases have been reported in Island County and Skagit County. One case each has been reported in Douglas County, Grays Harbor County, Jefferson County, Kittitas County and Lewis County. An additional case, that of a cruise ship worker, is counted at the state level only. September 19, 2009, the Washington department of health stopped counting individual cases of A/H1N1 influenza, and only counting hospitalizations and deaths from A/H1N1.

== West Virginia ==
As of July 22, there have been 276 reported cases. In November 2009, it was confirmed a West Virginia pediatrician had confirmed A/H1N1 influenza twice, once in July, and again in October. This is very rare, but does occur sporadically, according to the CDC. By November, the only state to have only Double cases (2 times the daily cases) right after South Korea.

== Wisconsin ==
As of July 22, 2009, Wisconsin has 5,147 confirmed cases, including 3,278 in Milwaukee. most of which are in the southern and south-eastern region of the state. So far, cases have been confirmed in 24 counties, however Milwaukee, Dane, Waukesha, and Columbia have the majority of the cases, with 706, 90, 54, and 52 respectively. As of May 24, 2009, Wisconsin currently has the most confirmed cases of swine flu in the United States. On June 1, 2009, it was confirmed that a Milwaukee resident with underlying health issues died from the virus. Two Wisconsin residents have died from the virus.

As of Friday June 12, 2009 there were 3,008 confirmed and probable cases and one death in Wisconsin reported by the CDC. As of Friday June 19, 2009 the CDC reported no change of these numbers.

=== Milwaukee ===
As of Friday, June 12, 2009, the largest city in Wisconsin, Milwaukee, reported the second death and 1,883 confirmed cases of swine flu. As of Tuesday, June 16, 2009, the city of Milwaukee reported the third death related to the novel flu and more than 2,000 confirmed cases in Milwaukee.

As of Thursday, June 18, 2009, Milwaukee reported 2,618 confirmed cases. The CDC update seems not to reflect the rising of case toll from 1,883 (June 12) to 2,618 (June 18) in the city of Milwaukee.

=== Dane County ===
Dane County reported 300 confirmed cases as of Thursday June 18, 2009.

=== Columbia County ===
Columbia County reported 68 confirmed cases as of June 5, 2009.

== Wyoming ==
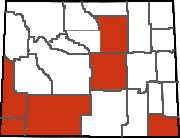
Death(s) confirmed Case(s) confirmed Case(s) unconfirmed (probable)

As of August 27, 2009, the Wyoming Department of Health reported 171 lab-confirmed cases of H1N1.

On August 19, 2009, the Wyoming Department of Health confirmed Wyoming's first death from H1N1 of a state resident infected with the swine flu (novel H1N1) virus as a victim who was a young adult female resident of Fremont County with an underlying health condition associated with higher risk of complications from influenza.

As of July 21, there have been 106 confirmed cases of swine flu in Wyoming.

== See also ==
- 2009 flu pandemic in the United States
