= New Hampshire Department of Health and Human Services =

Government agency in the U.S. state of New Hampshire

Agency overview
- Jurisdiction: New Hampshire
- Headquarters: 129 Pleasant Street; Concord, New Hampshire
- Motto: Optimal health and well-being for everyone.
- Employees: 2973 (2023)
- Annual budget: $3.1 B USD (FY24-25)
- Agency executives: Lori Weaver, Commissioner; Morissa Henn, Deputy Commissioner
- Website: www.dhhs.nh.gov

The New Hampshire Department of Health and Human Services (DHHS) is a state agency of the U.S. state of New Hampshire, headquartered in Concord. Providing services in the areas of mental health, developmental disability, substance abuse, and public health, it is the largest agency operated by the state.

== Organization ==
The department is organized into several divisions:

- Division for Behavioral Health
- Division of Economic and Housing Stability
- Division of Long Term Supports and Services
- Division for Children, Youth, and Families
- Division of Public Health Services
- Division of Medicaid Services
- Division of Legal and Regulatory Services

The Division for Children, Youth, and Families includes the Bureau of Juvenile Justice Services, which operates the Sununu Youth Services Center (SYSC), a juvenile justice institution. Located in Manchester, SYSC opened in April 2006, and holds children aged 13 through 17.

Also structured within the department are:

- Office of the Commissioner
- Bureau of Quality Assurance and Improvement
- Program Planning and Integrity
